= List of princes of Greece =

This is a list of Greek princes from the accession of George I of the House of Glücksburg to the throne of the Kingdom of Greece in 1863. Individuals holding the title of prince will usually also be styled "His Royal Highness" (HRH). The wife of a Greek prince will usually take the title and style of her husband. Despite Greece becoming a republic in 1924 and 1973, male-line descendants of George I continue to style themselves as a Prince or Princess of Greece, as well as Prince or Princess of Denmark.

== List of Greek princes since 1863 ==
Prince of Greece and Denmark by birth
(†) – Renouncing any rights to the throne of Greece on behalf of himself and his future descendants.
(‡) – Morganatic marriage

List of Greek Princes
Name	Born	Died	Royal lineage	Notes	Cyper
Constantine later, King Constantine I	1868	1923	1st son of King George I	Crown Prince and Duke of Sparta from birth until 18 March 1913.	
George	1869	1957	2nd son of King George I	High commissioner of the Cretan State in 1898–1906.	
Nikolaos	1872	1938	3rd son of King George I		
Andrew	1882	1944	4th son of King George I		
Christopher	1888	1940	5th son of King George I		
George later, King George II	1890	1947	1st son of King Constantine I & Grandson of King George I	Crown Prince from 18 March 1913 until 22 September 1922.	
Alexander later, King Alexander I	1893	1920	2nd son of King Constantine I & Grandson of King George I		
Paul later, King Paul I	1901	1964	3rd son of King Constantine I & Grandson of King George I	Crown Prince from 22 September 1922 to 25 March 1924; from 25 November 1935 to 1 April 1947.	
Peter	1908	1980	Only son of Prince George & Grandson of King George I		
Philippos later, Prince Philip, Duke of Edinburgh	1921	2021	Only son of Prince Andrew & Grandson of King George I	(†)	
Michael	1939	2024	Only son of Prince Christopher & Grandson of King George I	(†) (‡)	
Constantine later, King Constantine II	1940	2023	Only son of King Paul I & Gt-grandson of King George I	Crown Prince from 1 April 1947 until 6 March 1964.	
Paul	1967		1st son of King Constantine II & 2xGt-grandson of King George I	Crown Prince from birth until 1 June 1973.	
Nikolaos	1969		2nd son of King Constantine II & 2xGt-grandson of King George I		
Philippos	1986		3rd son of King Constantine II & 2xGt-grandson of King George I		
Constantine Alexios	1998		1st son of Crown Prince Paul & 3xGt-grandson of King George I		
Achilleas-Andreas	2000		2nd son of Crown Prince Paul & 3xGt-grandson of King George I		
Odysseas	2004		3rd son of Crown Prince Paul & 3xGt-grandson of King George I		
Aristidis	2008		4th son of Crown Prince Paul & 3xGt-grandson of King George I		
