= Princess Alexia of Greece and Denmark =

Greek princess (born 1965)

Princess Alexia
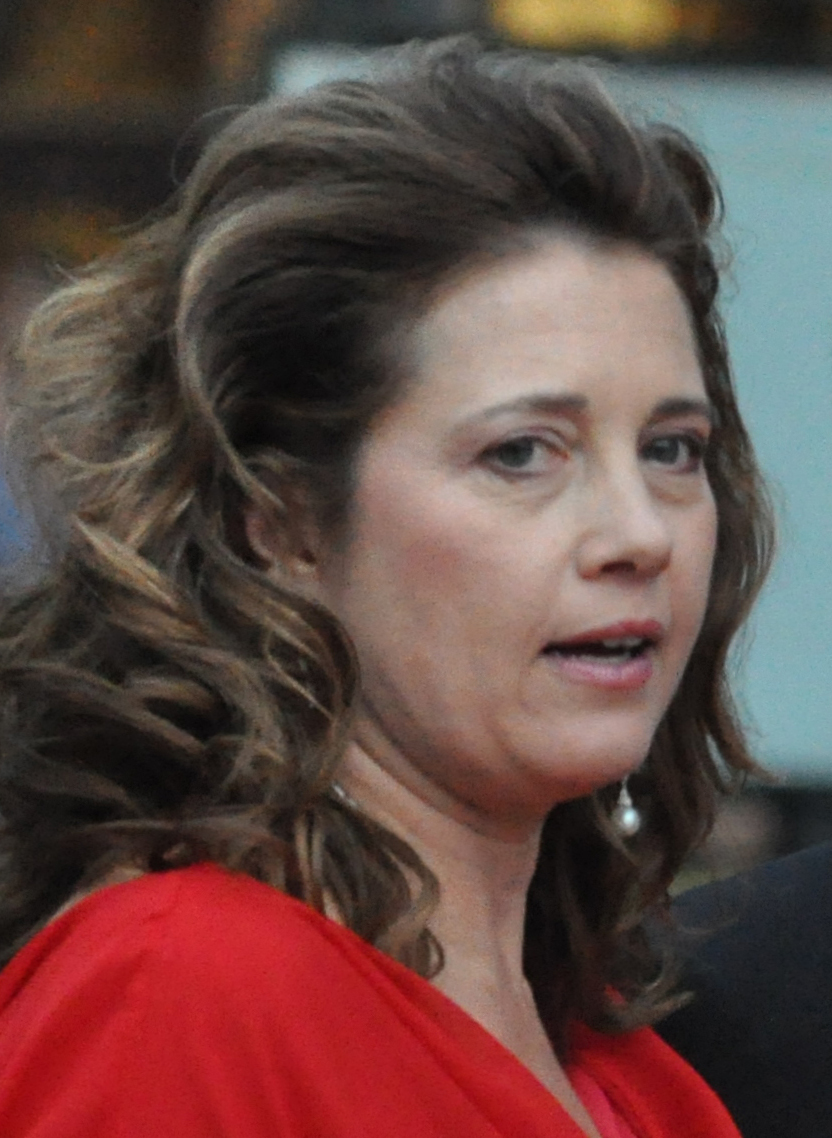
- Princess Alexia in 2010
- Born: 10 July 1965 (age 61); Mon Repos, Corfu, Kingdom of Greece
- Spouse: Carlos Morales Quintana (m. 1999)
- Issue: Arrietta Morales y de Grecia; Ana María Morales y de Grecia; Carlos Morales y de Grecia; Amelia Morales y de Grecia
- House: Glücksburg
- Father: Constantine II of Greece
- Mother: Anne-Marie of Denmark

Princess Alexia of Greece and Denmark (Greek: Αλεξία Ντε Γκρες, romanized: Alexía de Grèce; born 10 July 1965) is the eldest child of Constantine II and Anne-Marie, who were King and Queen of Greece from 1964 until the abolition of the monarchy in 1973. She was heiress presumptive to the Greek throne from her birth in 1965 until the birth of her brother Crown Prince Pavlos in 1967.

== Biography ==
Alexia was born on 10 July 1965 at Mon Repos, a villa on the Greek island of Corfu used at the time as a summer residence by the Greek royal family. She was the first child born to the then King Constantine II and Queen Anne-Marie of the Hellenes. At the time of her birth, her father was King of Greece, her grandfather was King of Denmark, and her great-grandfather was King of Sweden.

As the monarch's only child, between her own birth and the birth on 20 May 1967 of her brother Pavlos, Alexia was heir presumptive to the throne of the Hellenes, then an extant monarchy. The Greek Constitution of 1952 had changed Greece's order of succession to the throne from the previous Salic law, prevalent in much of the continent, and which precluded the succession of women, to male-preference primogeniture, which accorded succession to the throne to a female member of a dynasty if she has no brothers, similar to the then extant succession laws of the United Kingdom, Denmark and Spain.

Alexia grew up in exile and was raised in between Rome and London. In Rome, she and her brothers were tutored privately by Jon Kanellopoulos. These private lessons eventually became open to other Greek children living in Rome, and lessons would take place in their summerhouse garden rooms. The family then briefly moved to Denmark and stayed at Amalienborg Palace, and then to London the following year. Prior to Alexia's education at the Hellenic College of London, she attended the Miss Surtee's School for Boys and Girls in Rome, Italy. After Hellenic College, she went to the Froebel College of the Roehampton Institute, a division of the University of Surrey, in 1985 and took a BA in History and Education in 1988. In 1989, she achieved a Post Graduate Certificate of Education and became a primary school teacher in the inner city area of Southwark in London between 1989 and 1992 before moving to Barcelona where she became a teacher of children with developmental disabilities.

Οn 20 December 2024, Alexia, along with other members of the former royal family acquired Greek citizenship, under the surname "de Grèce".

== Marriage and children ==
On 9 July 1999, Alexia married Carlos Javier Morales Quintana, an architect and a champion yachtsman, at St. Sophia Cathedral, London. In May 1999, two months before their wedding, Alexia and Carlos were involved in a yachting accident on a boat named the Alexia. Alexia and Carlos were the only two people out of the thirteen on board to be injured. Alexia suffered a broken collarbone and Carlos a fractured kneecap. Plans for their wedding to be delayed were in place; however, both were able to recover in time for the originally planned date.

At her wedding, Alexia wore a gown by the Austrian designer Inge Sprawson. She also wore a Cartier diamond tiara that previously belonged to Margaret of Connaught. Alexia's mother, Anne-Marie, and grandmother, Ingrid, had both also worn the same tiara on their own wedding day. Her attendants included her sister Princess Theodora, her niece Princess Maria-Olympia, and Princess Mafalda, daughter of Kyril, Prince of Preslav, a son of former King Simeon of Bulgaria. Their wedding was preceded by a royal ball, two days prior.

Dual Cypher of Alexia and Carlos

Arms of a princess of Greece

The couple have four children:

- Arrietta Morales y de Grecia (b. 24 February 2002, Barcelona)
- Ana Maria Morales y de Grecia (b. 15 May 2003, Barcelona)
- Carlos Morales y de Grecia (b. 30 July 2005, Barcelona)
- Amelia Morales y de Grecia (b. 26 October 2007, Barcelona)

Their children's last names are "Morales y de Grecia", which translates to "Morales and of Greece", taking their father's surname and their mother's royal title.

Alexia and her family now live in her husband's native land, at Puerto Calero marina, Yaiza, Lanzarote in the Canary Islands, in a house designed by her husband. The Canary Islands are an autonomous community of Spain.

== Ancestry ==
Ancestors of Princess Alexia of Greece and Denmark

8. Constantine I of Greece
4. Paul of Greece
9. Princess Sophia of Prussia
2. Constantine II of Greece
10. Ernest Augustus, Duke of Brunswick
5. Princess Frederica of Hanover
11. Princess Victoria Louise of Prussia
1. Princess Alexia of Greece and Denmark
12. Christian X of Denmark
6. Frederik IX of Denmark
13. Duchess Alexandrine of Mecklenburg-Schwerin
3. Princess Anne-Marie of Denmark
14. Gustaf VI Adolf of Sweden
7. Princess Ingrid of Sweden
15. Princess Margaret of Connaught

Princess Alexia of Greece and Denmark House of Schleswig-Holstein-Sonderburg-Glücksburg Cadet branch of the House of Oldenburg Born: 10 July 1965
Greek royalty
Preceded by Princess Irene	Heir-presumptive to the Greek throne 1965–1967	Succeeded by Pavlos as Crown Prince
