= Greek referendum =

Greek referendum may refer to:

- 1862 Greek head of state referendum, on adopting Prince Alfred of the United Kingdom as king (approved)
- 1920 Greek referendum, on the return of King Constantine I (approved)
- 1924 Greek republic referendum, on becoming a republic (approved)
- 1935 Greek monarchy referendum, on restoring the monarchy (approved)
- 1946 Greek referendum, on maintaining the monarchy (approved)
- 1968 Greek constitutional referendum, on a new constitution following the military coup (approved)
- 1973 Greek republic referendum, on becoming a republic (approved)
- 1974 Greek republic referendum, on maintaining the republic (approved)
- 2011 Greek proposed economy referendum, on 'haircut' for creditors (referendum did not take place)
- 2015 Greek bailout referendum, on conditions required by IMF etc. for bailout (rejected)
