= Crown Prince of Greece =

Heir to the defunct throne of Greece

Arms of the Crown Prince

The Crown Prince of Greece (Greek: Διάδοχος, romanized: Diadochos) is the heir apparent or presumptive to the defunct throne of Greece. Since the abolition of the Greek monarchy by the then-ruling military regime on 1 June 1973, it is merely considered a courtesy title.

== Title ==
Neither the constitution of 1844 or 1864, which served as the basis for other fundamental laws of the Kingdom of Greece, recognised titles of nobility. On the contrary, they prohibited even the sovereign from conferring such titles. (Note: Article XXXIII of the Constitution of 1844 states: "The King has the right to confer the insignia of existing orders, in accordance with the laws which have been established. But can not give titles of nobility or recognise those who would be given by a foreign power to Greek citizens.") (Note: Article III of the Constitution of 1864 states: "Titles of nobility and distinction are neither conferred nor recognised for Greek citizens.")

As a result, the heir apparent was usually referred to simply as "the diadochos" by virtue of his function, rather than as a title. The word diadochos (διάδοχος) simply means "successor, he who collects the estate". This is a deverbal of διαδέχομαι (diadéchomai), "receive by succession", and has been used since the Archaic period for heirs-apparent. The most famous bearers of the title were the Diadochi, the "Successors" of Alexander the Great, who contended with each other for the spoils of his empire.

Only one crown prince, the future Constantine I, bore a separate title of nobility, that of duke of Sparta. It was created soon after his birth in 1868. However, that caused a political scandal as many viewed it as a violation of the constitution. In the end, the creation was ultimately ratified by the Greek parliament, while the title's use within Greece continued to be highly restricted.

== Succession ==
The London Conference of 1832, established a semi-salic line of succession which would pass the crown to Otto I's descendants, or his younger brothers, should he have no issue. It was also decided that in no case would the crowns of Greece and Bavaria be joined in a personal union.

The continued inability of King Otto and Queen Amalia to have children was a permanent threat to the stability of Otto's throne: the 1844 constitution insisted that Otto's successor had to be Orthodox, but as the king was childless, the only possible heirs were his younger brothers, Luitpold and Adalbert. The staunch Catholicism of the Wittelsbachs complicated matters, as Luitpold refused to convert and Adalbert married Infanta Amalia of Spain. The sons of Adalbert, and especially the eldest, Ludwig Ferdinand, were now considered the most likely candidates, but due to the issue of religion, no definite arrangements were ever made prior to Otto's deposition in 1862.

Since the establishment of the constitution of 1952, the daughters of the sovereign came after their brothers in the order of succession to the throne.

When Constantine II succeeded Paul I in 1964, his sister became heir presumptive according to the 1952 Constitution but that caused a constitutional crisis because his father's cousin Prince Peter who declared himself heir to the throne on the pretext that female dynasts had been unlawfully granted succession rights, but Prince Peter lost his succession rights by marrying Irina Ovtchinnikova in 1939. Also at the time Constantine's older sister Princess Sophia married the future Juan Carlos I in 1962 and cousin Prince Philip married Queen Elizabeth II in 1947 renounced their rights for their descendants.

== Personal standard ==
1914 version

1935 version

== List of heirs to the Greek throne ==
Monarch	Heir	Relationship to monarch	Became heir; reason	Ceased to be heir; reason	Next in succession, relation to heir
Otto I	Luitpold Karl	Younger brother	27 May 1832; Formation of Kingdom of Greece	18 March 1844; Non-Orthodox dynasts excluded from succession	Adalbert Wilhelm, brother
Otto I	None, 1844–1862				
None 1862–1863
George I	None, 1863–1868				
George I	Crown Prince Constantine	Son	2 August 1868; Born	18 March 1913; Father assassinated, became king	None, 1868–1869
George I	Crown Prince Constantine	Son	2 August 1868; Born	18 March 1913; Father assassinated, became king	Prince George, 1869–1890, brother
George I	Crown Prince Constantine	Son	2 August 1868; Born	18 March 1913; Father assassinated, became king	Prince George, 1890–1913, son
Constantine I	Crown Prince George	Son	18 March 1913; Father became king	11 June 1917; Father deposed, younger brother selected as king	Prince Alexander, brother
Alexander I	None, 1917–1920 (Note: On 11 June 1917, King Constantine I was deposed from the throne, and his second son, Prince Alexander was selected by the Allies of World War I to act as a puppet king, after the refusal of both Constantine I's eldest son (Crown Prince George) and brother (Prince George). Eventually all the members of the royal family went into exile, except for Alexander himself. King Alexander considered himself as merely a regent in the name of his father, as neither he nor his elder brother had abdicated. On 25 October 1920, Alexander died of sepsis after being bit by a monkey on 2 October. Still unwilling to restore Constantine I to the throne, the government of Eleftherios Venizelos offered the crown to his third son (Prince Paul), receiving another refusal on the same grounds of loyalty to Constantine I. On 14 November, Venizelos was defeated in the 1920 Greek legislative election and the new government of Dimitrios Rallis asked Queen Dowager Olga (who was allowed to return to Greece as Alexander was dying) to assume the regency until Constantine I's restoration on 19 December, after a referendum.)				
Constantine I	Crown Prince George	Son	19 December 1920; Father restored as king by referendum	27 September 1922; Father abdicated, became king	Prince Paul, brother
George II	Prince Paul	Brother	27 September 1922; Brother became king	25 March 1924; Monarchy abolished, confirmed by referendum	Prince George, uncle
None 1924–1935
George II	Prince Paul	Brother	25 November 1935; Monarchy restored by referendum	1 April 1947; Brother died, became king	Prince George, 1935–1940, uncle
George II	Prince Paul	Brother	25 November 1935; Monarchy restored by referendum	1 April 1947; Brother died, became king	Prince Constantine, 1940–1947, son
Paul I	Crown Prince Constantine	Son	1 April 1947; Father became king	6 March 1964; Father died, became king	Prince George, 1947–1952, granduncle
Paul I	Crown Prince Constantine	Son	1 April 1947; Father became king	6 March 1964; Father died, became king	Princess Sophia (Note: In 1952, the law of succession was changed from agnatic primogeniture to male-preference primogeniture.), 1952–1962, sister
Paul I	Crown Prince Constantine	Son	1 April 1947; Father became king	6 March 1964; Father died, became king	Princess Irene (Note: In 1962, Princess Sophia renounced her claim to the throne, in order to marry Juan Carlos, Prince of Asturias.), 1962–1964, sister
Constantine II	Princess Irene	Sister	6 March 1964; Brother became king	10 July 1965; Daughter born to king	Prince Michael, 1964–1965, first cousin once-removed
Constantine II	Princess Irene	Sister	6 March 1964; Brother became king	10 July 1965; Daughter born to king	None, 1965
Constantine II	Princess Alexia	Daughter	10 July 1965; Born	20 May 1967; Son born to king	Princess Irene, aunt
Constantine II	Crown Prince Paul	Son	20 May 1967; Born	1 June 1973; Monarchy abolished, confirmed by 1973 and 1974 referendums	Princess Alexia, 1967–1969, sister
Constantine II	Crown Prince Paul	Son	20 May 1967; Born	1 June 1973; Monarchy abolished, confirmed by 1973 and 1974 referendums	Prince Nikolaos, 1969–1973, brother

=== In pretense ===
Monarch	Heir	Relationship to monarch	Became heir; reason	Ceased to be heir; reason	Next in succession, relation to heir
Constantine II	Crown Prince Paul	Son	20 May 1967; Birth as first son of a reigning Sovereign (Note: Monarchy abolished, confirmed by 1973 and 1974 referendums.)	10 January 2023; Father died, became Head of House	Prince Nikolaos, 1973–1996, brother
Constantine II	Crown Prince Paul	Son	20 May 1967; Birth as first son of a reigning Sovereign	10 January 2023; Father died, became Head of House	Princess Maria-Olympia, 1996–1998, daughter
Constantine II	Crown Prince Paul	Son	20 May 1967; Birth as first son of a reigning Sovereign	10 January 2023; Father died, became Head of House	Prince Constantine-Alexios, 1998–2023, son
Paul II	Prince Constantine-Alexios	Son	10 January 2023; Father became Head of House		Prince Achileas-Andreas, 2023–today, brother

== See also ==
- Duke of Sparta

== Bibliography ==
- Jelavich, Barbara (1961). "Russia, Bavaria and the Greek Revolution of 1862/1863". Balkan Studies. 2 (1): 125–150. ISSN 2241-1674.
- Palmer, Alan W.; Michael of Greece (1990). The Royal House of Greece. Weidenfeld & Nicolson. ISBN 0297830600.
