= Greek royal family =

Last royal dynasty of Greece

Greek royal family Βασιλική Οικογένεια της Ελλάδος (Greek)
- Greater coat of arms since 1936

- Personal standard of the kings of Greece
- Parent family: House of Glücksburg
- Country: Kingdom of Greece
- Origin: Glücksburg, Schleswig-Holstein, Germany
- Founded: 30 March 1863; 163 years ago
- Founder: George I
- Current head: Crown Prince Pavlos
- Final ruler: Constantine II
- Connected families: Danish royal family Spanish royal family Mountbatten-Windsor
- Motto: Ἰσχύς μου ἡ ἀγάπη τοῦ λαοῦ (The people's love is my strength)
- Properties: Old Royal Palace; Royal Palace; Tatoi Palace; Mon Repos; Palace of St. Michael and St. George
- Deposition: 1 June 1973; 53 years ago
- Website: greekroyalfamily.gr

The Greek royal family (Greek: Βασιλική Οικογένεια της Ελλάδος) was the ruling family of the Kingdom of Greece from 1863 to 1924 and again from 1935 to 1973. The Greek royal family is a branch of the Danish royal family, itself a cadet branch of the House of Glücksburg. The family had replaced the House of Wittelsbach that previously ruled Greece from 1832 to 1862. The first monarch was George I of Greece, the second son of King Christian IX of Denmark. The current head of the family is former Crown Prince Pavlos, who assumed the role on 10 January 2023 upon the death of his father, former King Constantine II.

With the 1974 Greek republic referendum and Article 4 of the Constitution of Greece, all family members have been stripped of their honorific titles and the associated royal status. Many family members born after 1974 still use the titles "Prince of Greece" and "Princess of Greece" to describe themselves, but such descriptions are neither conferred nor legally recognised by the Greek state as royal or noble titles. The family accepts that these terms are not royal titles, but rather personal identifiers. (Note: The pertinent court decision (Συμβούλιο της Επικρατείας, αριθμός 4575/1996) states (in Greek): "The appellation 'former king' is mentioned in the application not as a title of nobility, which is prohibited by the Constitution (Article 4(7)), but rather to identify the identity of the applicant, who lacks a surname for the reasons outlined. That is to say, the appellation signifies that the applicant is Constantine, who was King of the Greeks until his deposition. This reference to a historical fact, along with other elements, may indeed serve to identify the individual in question, thereby enabling the provision of judicial protection. Full-text available in Greek at Συμβούλιο της Επικρατείας - Αναζήτηση Νομολογίας)

As of 2024, members of the family, including its head, Crown Prince Pavlos, have assumed the last name "De Grèce" (Ντε Γκρες; "of Greece"), first used by Greek author and dynast Prince Michael of Greece and Denmark for his pen name as Michel de Grèce, as the only one familiar to them.

== Creation ==
After the overthrow in 1862 of the first king of the independent Greek state, Otto of Bavaria, a plebiscite in Greece was initiated on 19 November 1862, (Note: 1 December in the New Style) with the results announced in February the following year, (Note: March in the New Style) in support of adopting Prince Alfred of the United Kingdom, later Duke of Edinburgh, to reign as king of the country. The candidacy of Prince Alfred was rejected by the Great Powers. The London Conference of 1832 had prohibited any of the Great Powers' ruling families from accepting the crown of Greece, while Queen Victoria was opposed to such a prospect.

A search for other candidates ensued, and eventually, Prince William of Denmark, of the House of Glücksburg, the second son of King Christian IX and younger brother of the then new Alexandra, Princess of Wales, was appointed king. The Greek Parliament unanimously approved on 18 March 1863 (Note: 30 March in the New Style) the ascension to the Greek throne of the prince, then aged 17, as King of the Hellenes under the regnal name of George I. George arrived in Greece in October 1863.

== Royal coat of arms ==
The royal coat of arms of Greece still used by the royal family is a blue shield with the white cross of Greece with the greater coat of arms of Denmark of 1819–1903 in the centre. This was consequently also the arms of Denmark when the Danish prince William accepted the Greek throne as King George I. As such this includes the three lions of the arms of Denmark proper, the two lions of Schleswig, the three crowns of the former Kalmar Union, the stockfish of Iceland, the ram of Faroe Islands, the polar bear of Greenland, the lion and hearts of the King of the Goths, the wyvern of the King of the Wends, the nettle leaf of Holstein, the swan with a crown of Stormarn, the knight on horseback of Dithmarschen, the horse head of Lauenburg, the two red bars of the House of Oldenburg and the yellow cross of Delmenhorst. The same shield is in the personal standard of the Kings of Greece. The shield is supported by two figures of Heracles, similar to the "wild men" of the Coat of arms of Denmark. The shield also has the Order of the Redeemer, while the royal motto reads " Ἰσχύς μου ἡ ἀγάπη τοῦ λαοῦ" ("The people's love is my strength").

== History ==
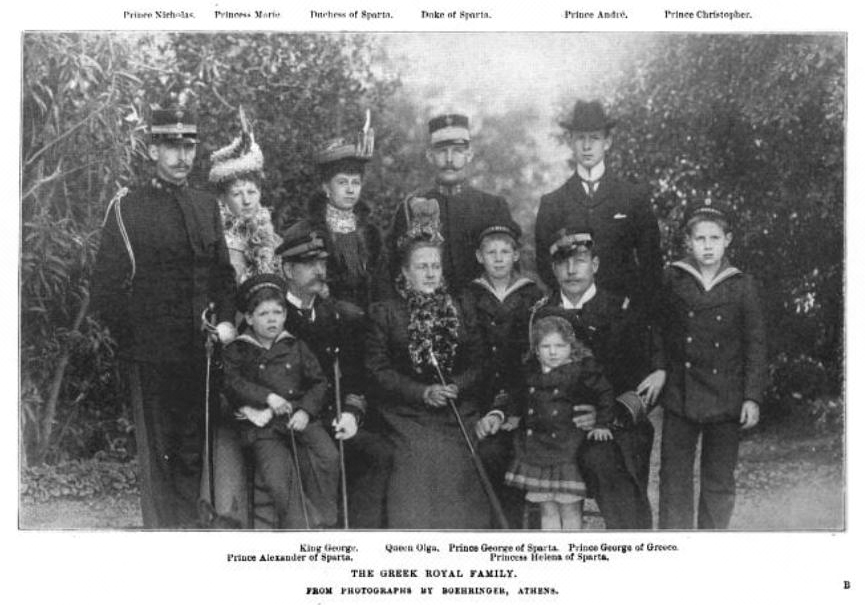
The royal family in 1900

George I married Grand Duchess Olga Constaninovna of Russia, and they had seven surviving children. After a reign of almost fifty years, George I was succeeded by his eldest son, Constantine I, who had married in 1889, Princess Sophia of Prussia, a granddaughter of Queen Victoria and sister of Kaiser Wilhelm II. In turn, all three of Constantine's sons, George II, Alexander and Paul, would occupy the throne.

The dynasty reigned in Greece during the Balkan Wars, World War I, World War II (during which Greece experienced occupation by the Axis), the Greek Civil War, and most of the Greek military junta of 1967–1974.

Following the National Schism during World War I and the subsequent Asia Minor Disaster, the monarchy was deposed in March 1924 and replaced by the Second Hellenic Republic. Between 1924 and 1935 there were twenty-three changes of government in Greece, a dictatorship, and thirteen coups d'etat. In October 1935, General Georgios Kondylis, a former Venizelist, overthrew the government and arranged for a referendum on restoring the monarchy. On 3 November 1935, the official tally showed that 98% of the votes supported the restoration of the monarchy. The balloting was not secret, and participation was compulsory. As Time described it at the time, "As a voter, one could drop into the ballot box a blue vote for George II, or one could cast a red ballot for the Republic." George II returned to Greece on 25 November 1935, as king.

Less than a year later, on 4 August 1936, George II endorsed the establishment of a quasi-fascist dictatorship led by veteran army officer Ioannis Metaxas.

George II followed the Greek government in exile after the German invasion of Greece in 1941 and returned to Greece in 1946, after a referendum that resulted in the maintaining of the constitutional monarchy. He died in 1947 and was succeeded by his brother Paul. The new king reigned from the time of Greek Civil War until his death in 1964, and was succeeded by his son, Constantine II.

== Downfall ==
On 21 April 1967, the elected government of Greece was overthrown by a group of middle-ranking army officers led by Colonel Georgios Papadopoulos, and a military dictatorship was established. The military junta formed a new government sworn in by Constantine II. On 13 December 1967, the king launched a counter-coup that failed and he, together with his family, fled to Rome and soon after to London.

The dictatorship nominally retained the monarchy but on 1 June 1973, Constantine II was declared "deposed," and Papadopoulos appointed himself "President of the Republic". Some two months later, on 29 July 1973, the military regime held a referendum, the official result of which confirmed, according to the junta, the abolition of the monarchy.

After July 1974, the dictatorship fell. The military handed power over to Konstantinos Karamanlis, a conservative (Note: See: People's Party; National Radical Union) politician who had been prime minister in the 1950s and early 60s. Karamanlis formed a "government of national unity" and held a constitutional referendum on 8 December 1974. The voters confirmed the abolition of the monarchy by a vote of 69% to 31% and the establishment of a republican parliamentary democracy in Greece. Later the upper house of parliament was abolished as well as freedom from prosecution for members of parliament.

=== Legal status ===
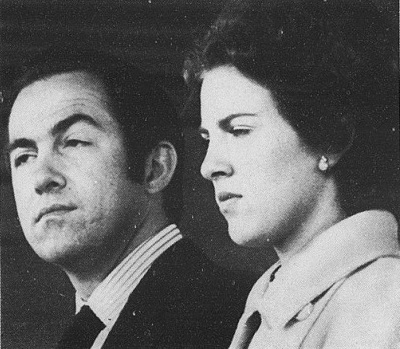
Constantine and Anne-Marie shortly after their expulsion from the Greek throne, in Rome in 1973

The former royal family lost its legal recognition with the constitutional amendment of 1973, finally ratified by the referendum of December 1974, and the new constitution that followed, which defined Greece as a presidential-parliamentary republic. As such, the royal and princely titles have no official status within or outside Greece, but are used in the context established by the Treaty of Vienna in 1815, which states that they are hereditary titles for life, which are retained even if the royal offices to which they are attached cease to exist. In 1996, the Council of State ruled that the use of titles was a means of identifying the person and not a title of nobility.

The issue of the former royal property was settled in 1994, which was registered with the state in exchange for compensation to the former king, and in 2024, the issue of citizenship was settled with the declaration of surnames by family members.

==== Greek citizenship ====
The recognition of Greek nationality—a recognition that was removed after the dethronement of the dynasty and the amendment of the constitution—was until recently a point of contention between Greek governments and the former royal family, and in particular the former King Constantine. Its resolution, with the recognition of Greek citizenship for Constantine's children and grandchildren on 20 December 2024, has smoothly closed the last open issue of the Metapolitefsi's period in Greece.

The former royal family had lost their Greek citizenship and had been stateless for almost 30 years, (Note: He and his family members held only Danish diplomatic passports as descendants of the King Christian IX of Denmark) under Law 2215 (also known as "the Evangelos Venizelos Law"), of 1994, which also confiscated their property. The law made it a condition for the reacquisition of citizenship that a suffix be declared at the registry office, a declaration that the former King Constantine had refused to make. The former king had said in an interview: "I have no surname. My family has no surname. The law says that I am not Greek and that my family was Greek only when we exercised our monarchical duties, and therefore I had to present myself and declare a surname. The problem is that my family is Danish and the Danish royal family has no surname."

The declaration was finally made on 19 December 2024, when 10 members of the former royal family (Contantine's children Alexia, Pavlos, Nikolaos, Theodora, Philippos, and Pavlos' children: Maria-Olympia, Constantine-Alexios, Achileas Andreas, Odysseas-Kimon, and Aristides-Stavros) went to the "Registrar of births, marriages and deaths" of Athens where they expressly and unconditionally declared their respect for the Constitution, their recognition of the Presidential parliamentary republic and the result of the referendum of 8 December 1974, and their renunciation of all claims of any kind in connection with any past political office or the possession of any title, as well as the renunciation of all claims of any kind connected with the past holding of any political office or the possession of any title. (Note: Similar procedure was followed in 2004, when Michael de Grèce, the former Prince of Greece, gain Greek citizenship) They chose the surname De Grèce, first used by their uncle Michel de Grèce, as the only one familiar to them. Queen Anne-Marie—although she lives almost permanently in Athens—refused to apply for a surname, saying "I have no surname because my family, which comes from Denmark, have no surname either", thus identifying her position with that of the late King Constantine, who had refused all these years to choose a surname in order to obtain the Greek citizenship he so desired.

The country's major opposition parties (PASOK and Syriza) have reacted negatively to this choice of surname. In particular, the constitutionalist and PASOK member of parliament Panagiotis Doudounis believes that this choice of surname is an "indirect non-recognition of the existing state regime". The same opinion was expressed by Syriza, which stated that the Greek legal system does not recognize "titles of nobility", which is what the specific adjective is trying to imply. Athens University Constitutional Law Emeritus Professor Nikos Alivizatos also criticized the decision of the Minister of the Interior arguing that it doesn't fulfill the requirements of the 1994 law, because "de Grèce" is not a "regular surname", but "a declaration of place of origin" and a title of distinction, such as those used by royalty and aristocrats, something that goes against the Greek Constitution. In February 2025 Athens University Administrative Law Professor Panos Lazaratos lodged an objection against the recognition of the surname filed by the members of the former royal family, arguing that it constitutes a form of indirect discrimination against all other citizens, and that it was unlawful to award them the Greek citizenship. The objection will be decided by the Council of State.

=== Issue of private royal property ===
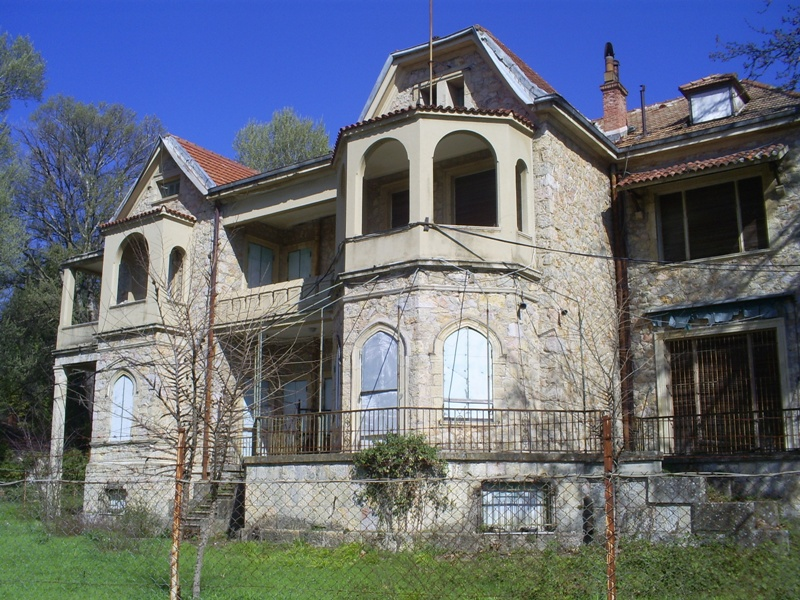
Tatoi palace

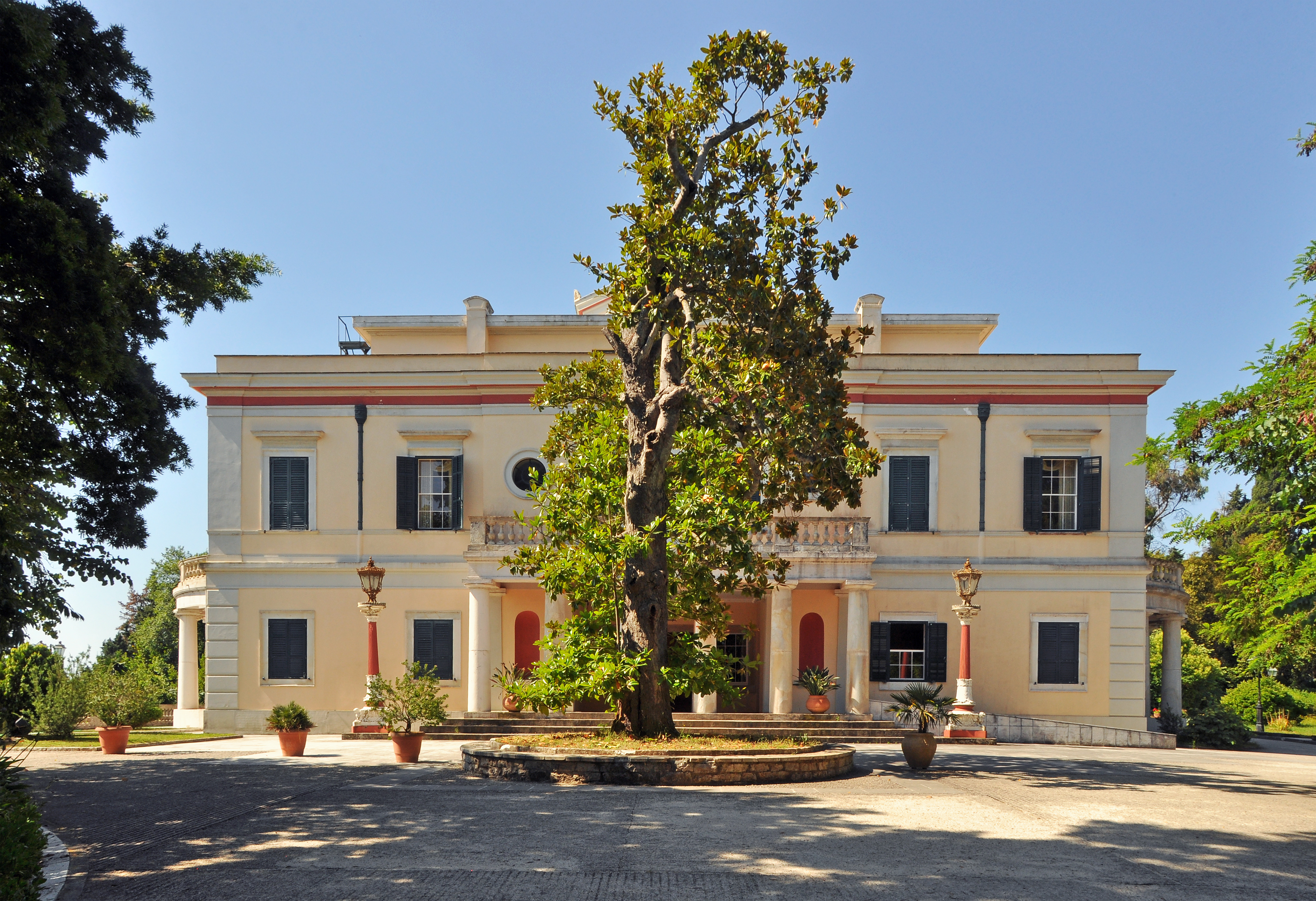
Mon Repos

Despite the abolition of the institution of the monarchy, there was no change in the ownership of the former king's property. The admiral, Marios Stavridis took over the administration of the estate as the legal representative of the family. When the amount of taxes and fines for non-payment, and the ensuing tax proceedings, reached an impasse, the government of Constantine Mitsotakis, through Law 2086/1992, reached an agreement with the former king to settle the financial arrears. This agreement, condemned by the opposition, was annulled when Andreas Papandreou became prime minister in 1993. The PASOK government, through Law 2215 of 1994, confiscated all the real estate of the royal family, demanded the return of all the movable property that had been secretly removed from the country in 1992, and set the conditions for granting citizenship to members of the family. Constantine disagreed with the content of the law and began a legal battle that ended in 2002 with the decision of the European Court of Human Rights. The Court ruled in favour of the former king, considering his property to be private property resulting from an inheritance, and set the amount at 13.7 million euros. The issue of the movable property was never raised again.

== Dynastic lineage ==
As male-line descendants of King Christian IX of Denmark, members of the dynasty bear the title of Prince or Princess of Denmark and thus are traditionally referred to as "Princes" or "Princesses of Greece and Denmark". With the sole exception of Aspasia Manos (the consort of King Alexander) and her daughter Princess Alexandra of Greece and Denmark, as well as descendants from non-dynastic marriages, none of the members were ethnically Greek.

== Members ==
=== Family tree of immediate members ===
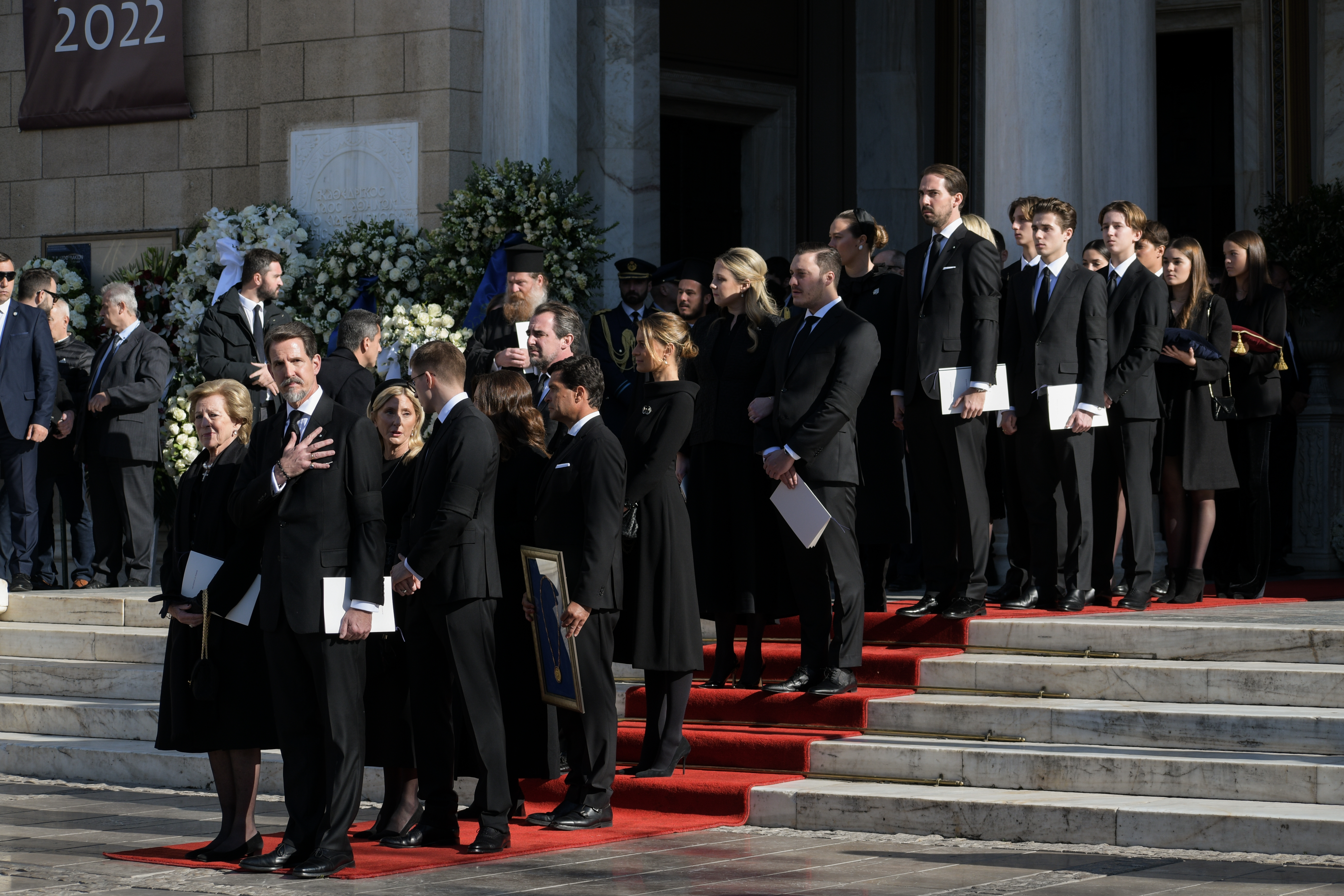
Descendants of Constantine II at his funeral in 2023

This section only lists living members of the royal family and deceased members who are ancestors of presently living members of the family.

King George I	Queen Olga
King Constantine I	Queen Sophia	Prince Andrew	Prince Christopher	Princess Françoise
Queen Frederica	King Paul	Prince Philip, Duke of Edinburgh*	Marina, consort of Prince Michael*	Prince Michael*
Queen Sofía of Spain*	King Constantine II	Queen Anne-Marie	Princess Irene	The King of the United Kingdom*	Princess Alexandra, Mrs. Mirzayantz*	The Duchess of Aosta*
Princess Alexia, Mrs. Morales	**The Crown Prince**	The Crown Princess	Princess Tatiana (divorced)	Prince Nikolaos	Princess Chrysí	Princess Theodora, Mrs. Kumar	Prince Philippos	Princess Nina
Princess Maria-Olympia	Prince Constantine-Alexios	Prince Achileas-Andreas	Prince Odysseas-Kimon	Prince Aristidis-Stavros	Prince Kimon

Notes

* Member of the extended royal family

=== Extended family ===
Italicised names denote that the individual has died. Bolded names denote that the individual is/was the head of the royal house. Please note that any living members who are not directly descended from Paul are considered extended family.

- **King George I**, who was born as a son of Christian IX and was elected as the first King of the Hellenes. He married Olga Constantinovna of Russia
  - **King Constantine I**, who married Princess Sophia of Prussia
    - **King George II**, who married and later divorced Princess Elisabeth of Romania
    - **King Alexander**, who married Aspasia Manos
      - Princess Alexandra of Greece and Denmark, who married Peter II of Yugoslavia
        - Alexander, Crown Prince of Yugoslavia
        - Their descendants as members of the Yugoslavian royal family
    - Princess Helen of Greece and Denmark, who married Carol II of Romania
      - Michael I of Romania, who married Princess Anne of Bourbon-Parma
      - Their descendants as members of the Romanian royal family
    - **King Paul**
      - Princess Sofía of Greece and Denmark, who married Juan Carlos I of Spain
        - Infanta Elena, Duchess of Lugo
        - Infanta Cristina of Spain
        - Felipe VI
        - Their descendants as members of the Spanish royal family
      - **King Constantine II**, who married Princess Anne-Marie of Denmark, daughter of Frederik IX
        - Princess Alexia, Mrs. Morales who married Carlos Morales Quintana
          - Arrietta Morales y de Grecia
          - Anna-Maria Morales y de Grecia
          - Carlos Morales y de Grecia
          - Amelia Morales y de Grecia
        - **Crown Prince Pavlos**, who was born as the eldest son of Constantine and Anne-Marie. He is currently the head of the royal house and is married to Marie-Chantal Miller.
          - Princess Maria-Olympia of Greece and Denmark
          - Prince Constantine-Alexios of Greece and Denmark, the heir apparent to the royal house of Greece.
          - Prince Achileas-Andreas of Greece and Denmark
          - Prince Odysseas-Kimon of Greece and Denmark
          - Prince Aristidis-Stavros of Greece and Denmark
        - Prince Nikolaos of Greece and Denmark, who married Tatiana Blatnik (div.) and later Chrysí Vardinogianni
        - Princess Theodora of Greece and Denmark, who married Matthew Kumar
        - Prince Philippos of Greece and Denmark, who married Nina Flohr
          - Prince Kimon Thomas Konstantinos of Greece and Denmark
      - Princess Irene of Greece and Denmark
    - Princess Irene of Greece and Denmark, who married Prince Aimone, Duke of Aosta
      - Prince Amedeo, Duke of Aosta
      - Their descendants as members of the House of Savoy
    - Princess Katherine of Greece and Denmark, who married Richard Brandram
      - Paul Brandram
  - Prince George of Greece and Denmark, who married Princess Marie Bonaparte
    - Prince Peter of Greece and Denmark, who married Irina Ovtchinnikova
    - Princess Eugénie of Greece and Denmark, who married Prince Dominik Rainer Radziwiłł and Raimundo, 2nd Duke of Castel Duino
      - Princess Tatiana Radziwiłł
      - Prince Jerzy Radziwiłł
      - Carlo Alessandro, 3rd Duke of Castel Duino
      - Their descendants are part of the Radziwiłł family and the Princely House of Thurn und Taxis
  - Princess Alexandra of Greece and Denmark, who married Grand Duke Paul Alexandrovich of Russia
    - Grand Duchess Maria Pavlovna of Russia
    - Grand Duke Dmitri Pavlovich of Russia
    - Their descendants as members of the Russian royal family
  - Prince Nicholas of Greece and Denmark, who married Grand Duchess Elena Vladimirovna of Russia
    - Princess Olga of Greece and Denmark, who married Prince Paul of Yugoslavia
      - Prince Alexander of Yugoslavia
      - Prince Nikola of Yugoslavia
      - Princess Elizabeth of Yugoslavia
      - Yugoslavian royal family
    - Princess Elizabeth of Greece and Denmark, who married Carl Theodor, Count of Törring-Jettenbach
      - Hans Veit, Count of Törring-Jettenbach
      - Archduchess Helene of Austria
    - Princess Marina of Greece and Denmark, who married Prince George, Duke of Kent
      - Prince Edward, Duke of Kent
      - Princess Alexandra, The Honourable Lady Ogilvy
      - Prince Michael of Kent
      - Their descendants as extended members of the British royal family
  - Princess Maria of Greece and Denmark, who married Grand Duke George Mikhailovich of Russia and Perikles Ioannidis
    - Princess Nina Georgievna of Russia
    - Princess Xenia Georgievna of Russia
    - Their descendants are part of the House of Chavchavadze and the Russian royal family
  - Princess Olga of Greece and Denmark
  - Prince Andrew of Greece and Denmark, who married Princess Alice of Battenberg
    - Princess Margarita of Greece and Denmark, who married Gottfried, Prince of Hohenlohe-Langenburg
      - Kraft, Prince of Hohenlohe-Langenburg
      - Princess Beatrix of Hohenlohe-Langenburg
      - Prince Georg Andreas of Hohenlohe-Langenburg
      - Prince Rupprecht of Hohenlohe-Langenburg
      - Prince Albrecht of Hohenlohe-Langenburg
      - Their descendants are part of the House of Hohenlohe-Langenburg
    - Princess Theodora of Greece and Denmark, who married Berthold, Margrave of Baden
      - Princess Margarita of Baden
      - Maximilian, Margrave of Baden
      - Their descendants as members of the House of Baden and the Yugoslavian royal family
    - Princess Cecilie of Greece and Denmark, who married Georg Donatus, Hereditary Grand Duke of Hesse
      - Prince Ludwig of Hesse
      - Prince Alexander of Hesse
      - Princess Johanna of Hesse
    - Princess Sophie of Greece and Denmark, who married Prince Christoph of Hesse and Prince George William of Hanover
      - Princess Christina of Hesse
      - Their descendants as members of the Yugoslavian royal family
    - Prince Philip of Greece and Denmark, who married Elizabeth II of the United Kingdom
      - Charles III who married Lady Diana Spencer and Camilla Shand
      - Anne, Princess Royal who married Mark Phillips and Timothy Laurence
      - Andrew Mountbatten-Windsor who married Sarah Ferguson
      - Prince Edward, Duke of Edinburgh who married Sophie Rhys-Jones
      - Their descendants as members of the British royal family
  - Prince Christopher of Greece and Denmark, who married Nancy Stewart Worthington Leeds and Princess Françoise of Orléans
    - Prince Michael of Greece and Denmark, who married Marina Karella
      - Princess Alexandra of Greece, who married Nicolas Mirzayantz
        - Tigran Mirzayantz
        - Darius Mirzayantz
      - Princess Olga of Greece, who married Prince Aimone, Duke of Aosta
        - Prince Umberto of Savoy-Aosta
        - Prince Amedeo of Savoy-Aosta
        - Princess Isabella of Savoy-Aosta

== See also ==
- Timeline of modern Greek history
- List of kings of Greece
- Monarchy of Greece
- Tatoi Palace
