= Prince Constantine of Greece =

Prince Constantine of Greece may refer to:

- Constantine I of Greece (1868–1923), king of Greece from 1913 to 1917 and again from 1920 to 1922
- Constantine II of Greece (1940–2023), king of Greece from 1964 to 1973
- Prince Constantine Alexios of Greece and Denmark (born 1998), eldest grandson of Constantine II
