= Duke of Sparta =

Title of the heir apparent to the Kingdom of Greece

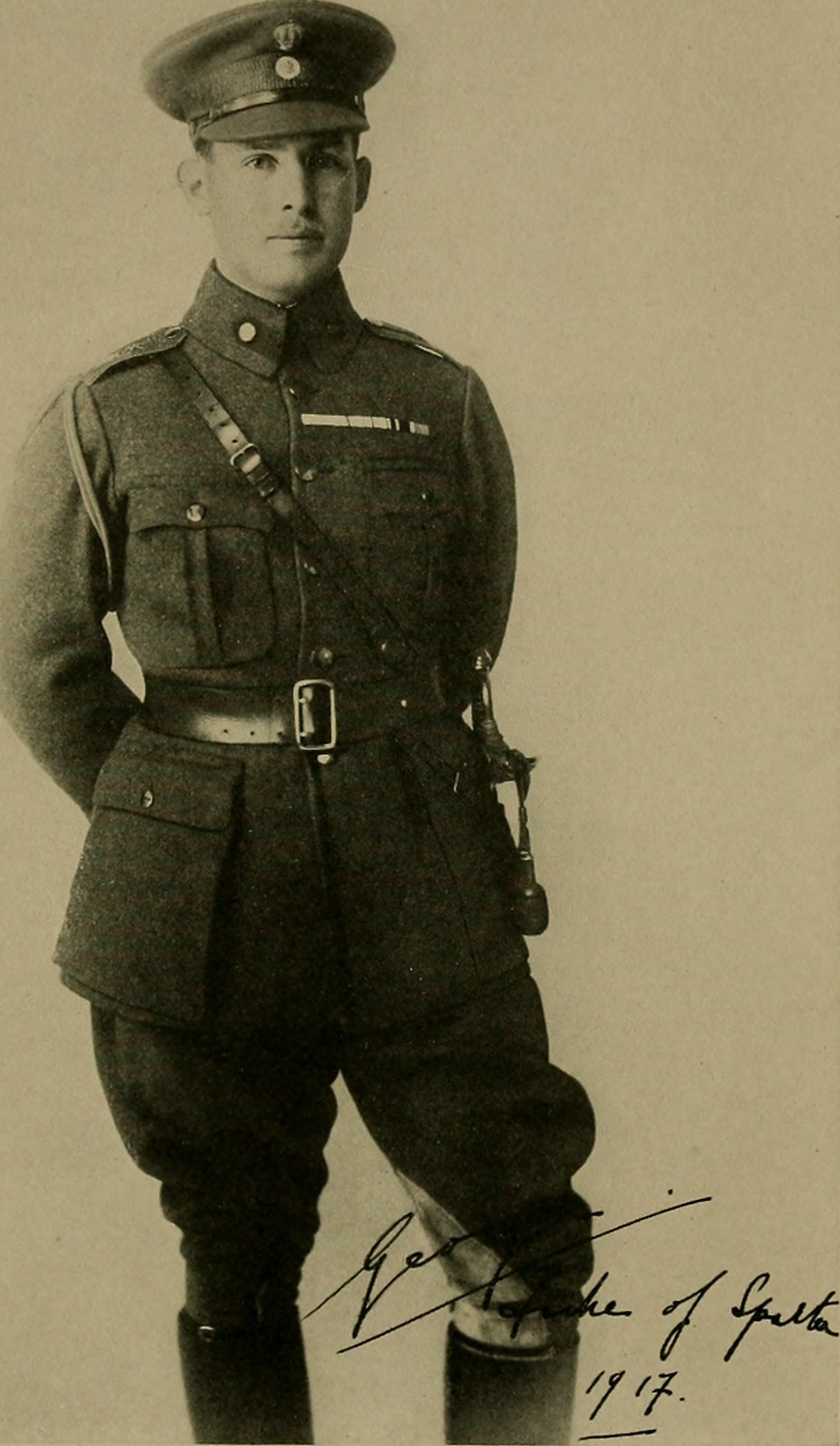
1917 autograph of the future George II of Greece, using the title 'Duke of Sparta'

Duke of Sparta (Katharevousa: Δοὺξ τῆς Σπάρτης, Demotic Greek: Δούκας της Σπάρτης) was a title instituted in 1868 to designate the Crown Prince of the Kingdom of Greece. Its legal status was exceptional, as the Constitution of Greece forbade the award or acceptance of titles of nobility for Greek citizens. Consequently, it was mostly used abroad, and only occasionally and unofficially within Greece.

The birth of Crown Prince Constantine (later king as Constantine I) on 2 August [O.S. 21 July] 1868 was widely celebrated in Greece, especially as the heir apparent's name resonated with the Byzantine imperial tradition and the irredentist aspirations enshrined in the "Megali Idea". As a result, on the day of the Crown Prince's baptism on 3 September [O.S. 22 August], at the initiative of the Prime Minister Dimitrios Voulgaris, his father, King George I, issued a decree according to which Constantine, as well as any future heir to the Greek crown, would bear the title "Duke of Sparta". The choice of the title was deliberate in order to associate the crown prince with Sparta and nearby Mystras, made famous under the last Byzantine dynasty, the Palaiologoi, as the seat of the Despotate of the Morea.

However, this decree was contrary to Article 3 of the Greek Constitution of 1864, which expressly prohibited the recognition of foreign titles of nobility or the conferment of such on Greek citizens, a constitutional practice that had been established already during the Greek War of Independence (1821–1829), even though several of its leading figures had previously borne such titles. The Constitution of 1864 designated the heir-apparent merely by the term Διάδοχος (lit. 'successor'), a functional description without any connotations of a title of nobility.

This led to a stormy debate in Parliament, at the instigation of the journalist and MP Timoleon Filimon. The government of the day backed the decree on the argument that the constitutional provision did not apply to members of the Greek royal family, but Filimon and others countered that the phrasing made no distinction, and that the decree thus violated the constitution. Filimon in particular objected to the use of the Western title of "Duke", which he rejected as representing "a barbarous and alien nobility" rather than genuinely Greek traditions. The MP Efstathios Iliopoulos further pointed out that the royal decree violated also Article 44 of the Constitution, which stipulated that the king possessed only the powers explicitly vested in him, and that the right to award titles of nobility was not among these. Voulgaris' assertion that the royal family was excluded was also opposed on similar grounds by the MP Athanasios Petmezas, who argued that such an exception would have to be explicit. The decree was finally approved by Parliament on 29 September [O.S. 17 September] 1868, with 98 votes in favour, 2 abstentions, and 26 against.

Nevertheless, use of the title "Duke of Sparta" within Greece was later quietly dropped from official use. However, Crown Prince Constantine was known as "HRH The Duke of Sparta" on the international scene from his birth until his accession in 1913—for 45 years. This again led to the misunderstanding of various, quite respectable publications that the title "Duke of Sparta" was synonymous with that of "Crown Prince of Greece", and the title has thus re-surfaced from time to time, but neither of the successive Crown Princes of Greece have ever been officially styled thus.

== See also ==
- List of heirs to the Greek throne
