= Prince Achileas-Andreas of Greece and Denmark =

Member of the Greek former royal family (born 2000)

Prince Achileas-Andreas
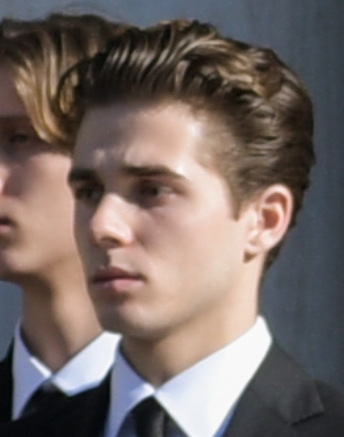
- Achileas-Andreas at his grandfather's funeral in 2023
- Born: 12 August 2000 (age 26); Weill Cornell Medical Center, New York City, New York, U.S.
- House: Glücksburg
- Father: Pavlos, Crown Prince of Greece
- Mother: Marie-Chantal Miller
- Occupation: Actor

Prince Achileas-Andreas of Greece and Denmark (Greek: Αχιλλέας Ανδρέας Ντε Γκρες, romanized: Achilléas-Andréas de Grèce; born 12 August 2000), known by the stage name Achi Miller, is an actor, socialite, and member of the former Greek royal family and the extended Danish royal family. He is the second son and third child of Crown Prince Pavlos of Greece and Marie-Chantal Miller. His paternal grandparents are Constantine II of Greece and Anne-Marie of Denmark, who were the last King and Queen of the Hellenes. He made his acting debut in 2017 in the American soap opera The Bold and the Beautiful and appeared in the 2023 American comedy film No Hard Feelings.

== Early life and education ==
Achileas-Andreas was born on 12 August 2000 at Weill Cornell Medical Center in New York City. He was christened in a Greek Orthodox ceremony at St. Sophia's Cathedral in London on 7 June 2001.

He grew up in London from 2004 when his family decided to move to the United Kingdom to stay near his paternal grandparents. He was educated at Wellington College in Berkshire. He moved back to New York when his older brother and sister started university. He attended New York University, graduating in 2023.

== Personal life ==
On September 28, 2024, Achileas-Andreas served as a groomsman at the wedding of Princess Theodora of Greece and Denmark and Matthew Kumar at the Metropolitan Cathedral in Athens.

Achileas-Andreas was in a relationship with Isabella Massenet, daughter of Dame Natalie Massenet, until October 2024.

Οn 20 December 2024, Achileas-Andreas along with other members of the former royal family acquired Greek citizenship, under the surname "de Grèce".

== Career ==
Between 2017 and 2019, he made recurring appearances on the American television soap opera The Bold and the Beautiful. Under the stage name Achi Miller, he had a minor role in the 2023 film No Hard Feelings.

=== Filmography ===
Date	Title	Role	Notes
2017–2019	The Bold and the Beautiful	Simon	TV series, recurring role
2022	Just Noise	Nick	Short film
2023	No Hard Feelings	Teen	Film, minor role
