= List of kings of Greece =

King of the Hellenes
- Βασιλεύς των Ελλήνων
- Greater Coat of arms of Kingdom of Greece

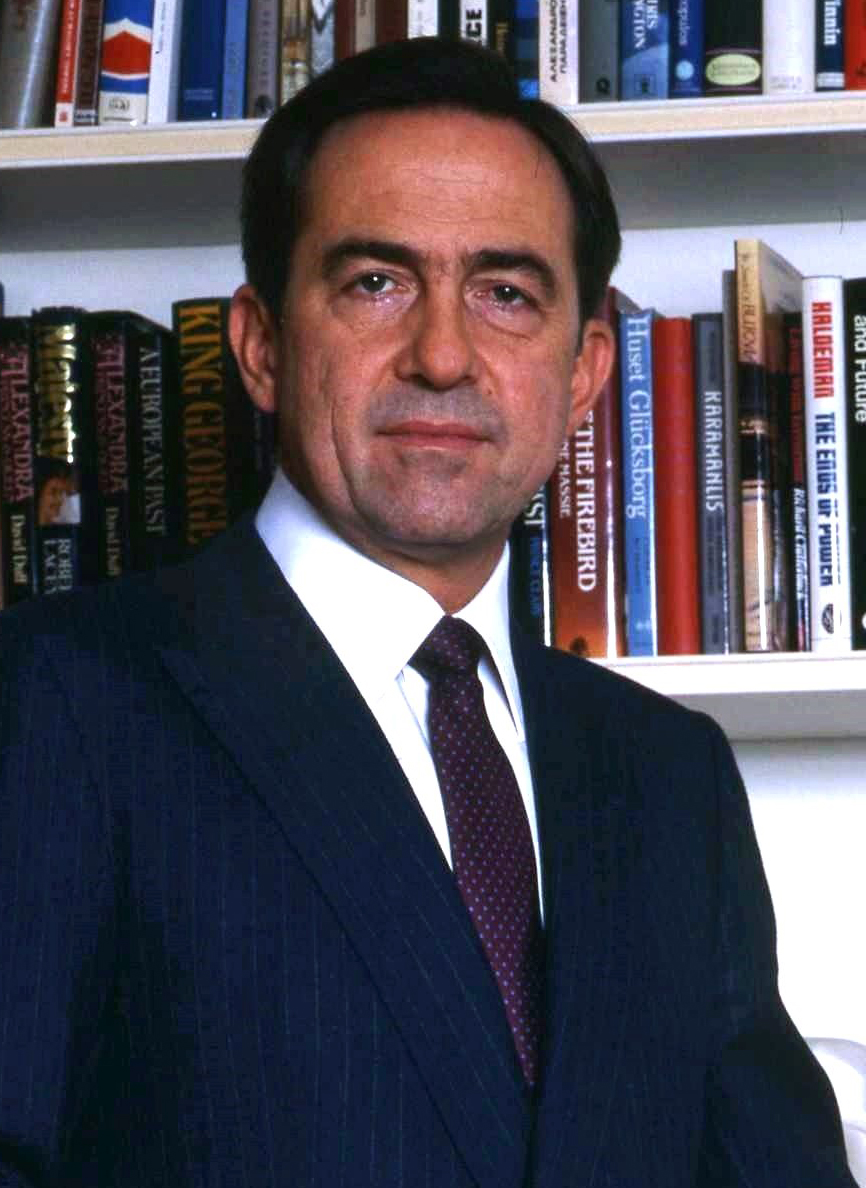
- Last to reign Constantine II; 6 March 1964 – 1 June 1973

Details
- Style: His Majesty
- First monarch: Otto
- Last monarch: Constantine II
- Formed: 30 August 1832
- Abolished: 1 June 1973
- Residences: Old Royal Palace (main residence); New Royal Palace (main residence); Tatoi Palace (summer residence)
- Appointer: Hereditary
- Pretender: Pavlos, Crown Prince of Greece

The Kingdom of Greece was ruled by the House of Wittelsbach from 1832 to 1862 and by the House of Glücksburg from 1863 to 1924 and, after being temporarily abolished in favor of the Second Hellenic Republic, again from 1935 to 1973, when it was once more abolished and replaced by the Third Hellenic Republic.

Only the first King, Otto, was actually styled King of Greece (Greek: Βασιλεὺς τῆς Ἑλλάδος). His successor, George I, was styled King of the Hellenes (Greek: Βασιλεὺς τῶν Ἑλλήνων), as were all other modern Greek monarchs.

The Greek monarchy was definitively abolished weeks before the referendum in 1973 conducted under the auspices of the then-ruling military regime, which confirmed the abolishment. It was re-confirmed by a second referendum in 1974, after the restoration of democratic rule.

== House of Wittelsbach ==
The London Conference of 1832 was an international conference convened to establish a stable government in Greece. Negotiations between the three Great Powers (United Kingdom, France and Russia) resulted in the establishment of the Kingdom of Greece under a Bavarian prince. The decisions were ratified in the Treaty of Constantinople later that year.

The convention offered the throne to the Bavarian Prince, Otto. They also established the line of succession which would pass the crown to Otto's descendants, or his younger brothers should he have no issue. It was also decided that in no case would there be a personal union of the crowns of Greece and Bavaria.

Name Reign	Duration of reign	Portrait	Arms	Birth Date, location, parents	Marriage(s) Issue	Death	Title Succession right
Otto (Ὄθων); 7 May 1832 (Note: Protocol signed in 1832 but landed in Greece on 6 February 1833.) (Note: Dates are in the New Style Gregorian calendar. The Old Style Julian calendar was used in Greece until Alexander's lifetime.) – 23 October 1862	30 years, 170 days			1 June 1815; Salzburg, Austrian Empire Son of Ludwig I of Bavaria and Therese of Saxe-Hildburghausen	Amalia of Oldenburg; 22 December 1836 No children	26 July 1867; Bamberg, Kingdom of Bavaria Aged 52	King of Greece Chosen by the Great Powers

== House of Schleswig-Holstein-Sonderburg-Glücksburg ==
In October 1862, King Otto was deposed in a popular revolt, but while the Greek people rejected Otto, they did not seem averse to the concept of monarchy per se. Many Greeks, seeking closer ties to the pre-eminent world power, the United Kingdom, rallied around the idea that Prince Alfred, the second son of Queen Victoria and Prince Albert, could become the next king. British Foreign Secretary Lord Palmerston believed that the Greeks were "panting for increase in territory", hoping that the election of Alfred as king would also result in the incorporation of the Ionian Islands, which were then a British protectorate, into an enlarged Greek state.

The London Conference of 1832, however, had prohibited any of the Great Powers' ruling families from accepting the crown of Greece, and in any event, Queen Victoria was adamantly opposed to the idea. Nevertheless, the Greeks insisted on holding a referendum on the issue of the head of state in November 1862. It was the first referendum ever held in Greece.

Prince Alfred turned down the kingship and Prince William of Denmark, the second son of Prince Christian of Denmark (the Danish heir-presumptive), was elected by the National Assembly to become King George I of the Hellenes.

Name Reign	Duration of reign	Portrait	Arms	Birth Date, location, parents	Marriage(s) Issue	Death	Title Succession right
George I (Γεώργιος Αʹ); 30 March 1863 – 18 March 1913	49 years, 353 days			24 December 1845; Copenhagen, Denmark Son of Christian IX of Denmark and Louise of Hesse-Kassel	Olga Constantinovna of Russia; 27 October 1867 8 children	18 March 1913; Thessaloniki, Ottoman Empire (Note: At the time of the King's assassination, Thessaloniki was in occupied Ottoman territory. The city was recognized as part of the Kingdom of Greece by the Treaty of Bucharest (1913) five months afterwards.) Aged 67	King of the Hellenes (Βασιλεὺς τῶν Ἑλλήνων) Third cousin once removed through Christian Karl Reinhard of Leiningen-Dagsburg-Falkenburg and then elected King of the Greeks.
Constantine I (Κωνσταντῖνος Αʹ); 18 March 1913 – 11 June 1917	4 years, 85 days			2 August 1868; Athens, Kingdom of Greece Son of George I of Greece and Olga Constantinovna of Russia	Sophia of Prussia; 27 October 1889 6 children	11 January 1923; Palermo, Kingdom of Italy Aged 54	King of the Hellenes (Βασιλεὺς τῶν Ἑλλήνων) Son of George I
Alexander (Ἀλέξανδρος); 11 June 1917 – 25 October 1920	3 years, 136 days			1 August 1893; Athens, Kingdom of Greece Son of Constantine I of Greece and Sophia of Prussia	Aspasia Manos; 17 November 1919 1 child	25 October 1920; Athens, Kingdom of Greece Aged 27	King of the Hellenes (Βασιλεὺς τῶν Ἑλλήνων) Son of Constantine I
Constantine I (Κωνσταντῖνος Αʹ); 19 December 1920 – 27 September 1922	1 year, 282 days			2 August 1868; Athens, Kingdom of Greece Son of George I of Greece and Olga Constantinovna of Russia	Sophia of Prussia; 27 October 1889 6 children	11 January 1923; Palermo, Kingdom of Italy Aged 54	King of the Hellenes (Βασιλεὺς τῶν Ἑλλήνων) Son of George I
George II (Γεώργιος Βʹ); 27 September 1922 – 25 March 1924	1 year, 160 days			19 July 1890; Athens, Kingdom of Greece Son of Constantine I of Greece and Sophia of Prussia	Elisabeth of Romania; 27 February 1921 Divorced; 6 July 1935 (after this reign) No children	1 April 1947; Athens, Kingdom of Greece Aged 56	King of the Hellenes (Βασιλεὺς τῶν Ἑλλήνων) Son of Constantine I

The monarchy was abolished in 1924 and replaced by the Second Hellenic Republic.

== Second Hellenic Republic ==
The Hellenic Republic was proclaimed on 25 March 1924, in the aftermath of Greece's defeat by Turkey in the Asia Minor campaign, which was widely blamed on the royalist government. During its brief existence, the Second Republic proved unstable. Greek society continued to be divided, as it was since the National Schism, between the pro-Republican Venizelists and the monarchists represented by the People's Party, who refused to acknowledge even the legitimacy of the Republic.

The cleavage in society extended to cultural and social issues such as differences over the use of Greek language to architectural styles. To this polarization was added the destabilizing involvement of the military in politics which resulted in several coups and attempted coups. The economy was in ruins following a decade of warfare and was unable to support the 1.5 million refugees from the population exchange with Turkey.

Despite the efforts of the reformist government of Eleftherios Venizelos in 1928–1932, the Great Depression had a disastrous impact on Greece's economy. The electoral victory of the People's Party in 1933, and two failed Venizelist coups, paved the way to the restoration of the reign of King George II.

== House of Glücksburg (restored) ==
In 1935, Prime Minister Georgios Kondylis, a former pro-Venizelos military officer, became the most powerful political figure in Greece. He compelled Panagis Tsaldaris to resign as Prime Minister and took over the government, suspending many constitutional provisions in the process. Kondylis, who had now joined the Conservatives, decided to hold a referendum in order to re-establish the monarchy, despite the fact that he used to be a supporter of the anti-monarchist wing of Greek politics.

Name Reign	Duration of reign	Portrait	Arms	Birth Date, location, parents	Marriage(s) Issue	Death	Title Succession right
George II (Γεώργιος Βʹ); 25 November 1935 – 1 April 1947	11 years, 149 days			19 July 1890; Athens, Kingdom of Greece Son of Constantine I of Greece and Sophia of Prussia	Elisabeth of Romania; 27 February 1921 Divorced; 6 July 1935 (before this reign) No children	1 April 1947; Athens, Kingdom of Greece Aged 56	King of the Hellenes (Βασιλεὺς τῶν Ἑλλήνων) Son of Constantine I
Paul (Παῦλος); 1 April 1947 – 6 March 1964	16 years, 340 days			14 December 1901; Athens, Kingdom of Greece Son of Constantine I of Greece and Sophia of Prussia	Frederica of Hanover; 9 January 1938; 3 children	6 March 1964; Athens, Kingdom of Greece Aged 62	King of the Hellenes (Βασιλεὺς τῶν Ἑλλήνων) Son of Constantine I
Constantine II (Κωνσταντῖνος Βʹ); 6 March 1964 – 1 June 1973	9 years, 87 days			2 June 1940; Athens, Kingdom of Greece Son of Paul of Greece and Frederica of Hanover	Anne-Marie of Denmark; 18 September 1964; 5 children	10 January 2023; Athens, Greece Aged 82	King of the Hellenes (Βασιλεὺς τῶν Ἑλλήνων) Son of Paul

The monarchy was again abolished in 1973 and replaced by a republic. After the fall of the Greek junta in July 1974, the government held another referendum in December 1974 with the result being (again) to confirm the abolition of the monarchy and to establish the Third Hellenic Republic.

== See also ==
- Greek crown jewels
- Greek royal family
- Crown Prince of Greece
- List of regents of Greece
- List of Greek royal consorts
- List of heads of state of Greece
- Monarchy of Greece
- Investiture of the kings of Greece
