= Mon Repos, Corfu =

Royal estate on the island of Corfu, Greece

Mon Repos
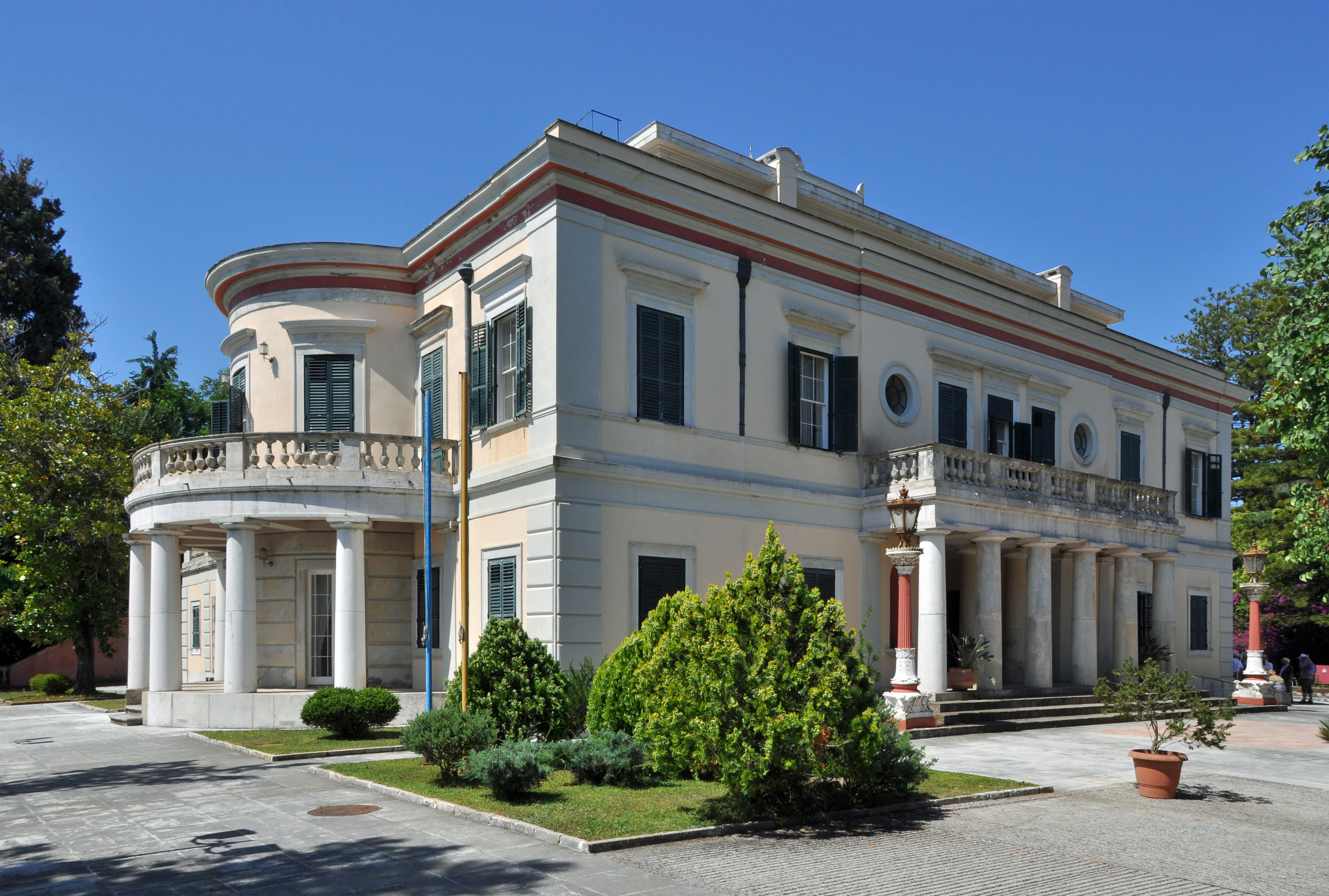
- Established: 1828; 198 years ago
- Location: Corfu, Greece
- Coordinates: 39°36′23″N 19°55′34″E
- Website: odysseus.culture.gr/h/1/eh151.jsp?obj_id=3463

Mon Repos (French: [mɔ̃ ʁ(ə)po]) is a former royal summer residence on the island of Corfu, Greece. It lies south of Corfu City in the forest of Palaeopolis. Since 2001, it has housed the Museum of Palaiopolis—Mon Repos.

== History ==
Villa Mon Repos

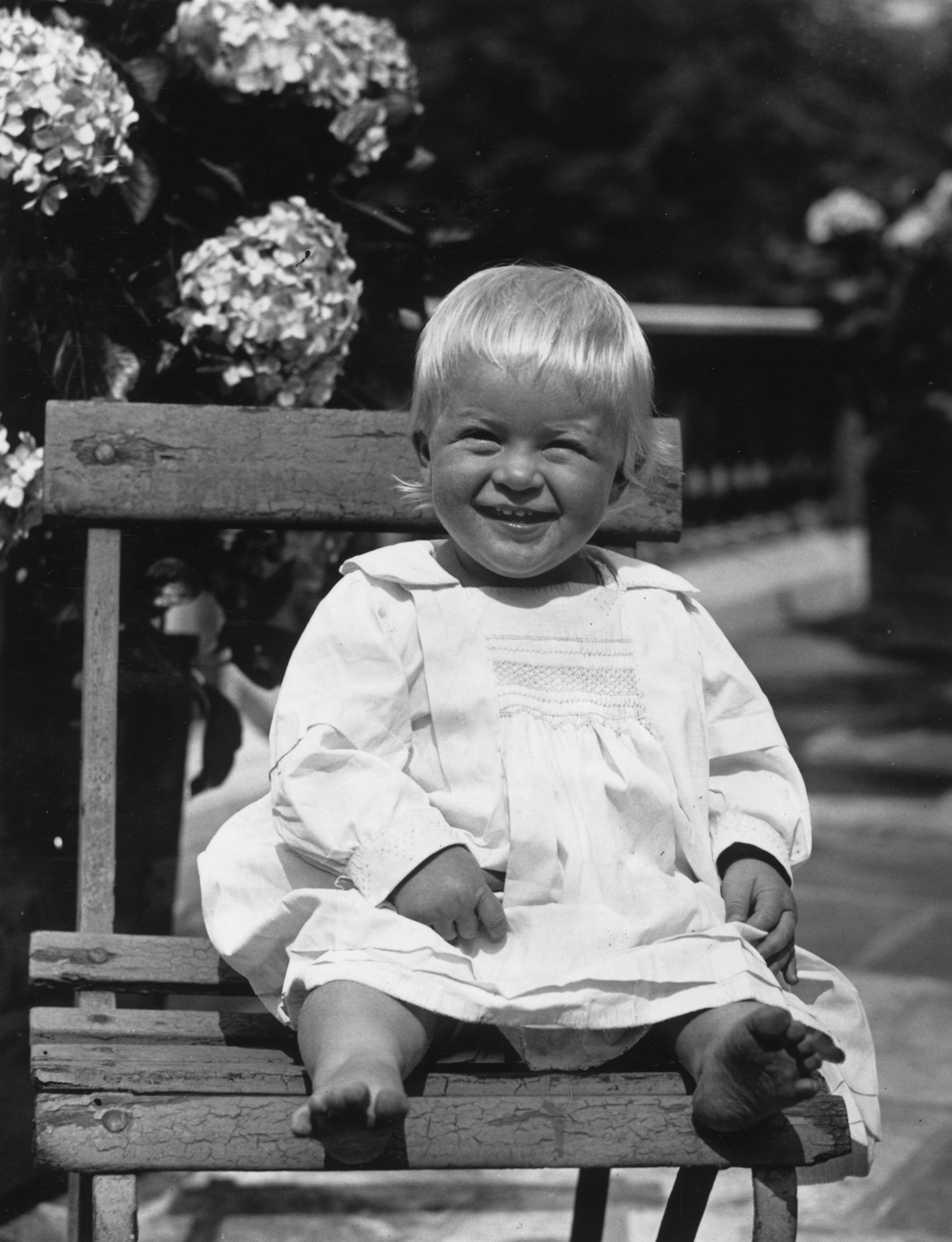
Prince Philip was born at Mon Repos

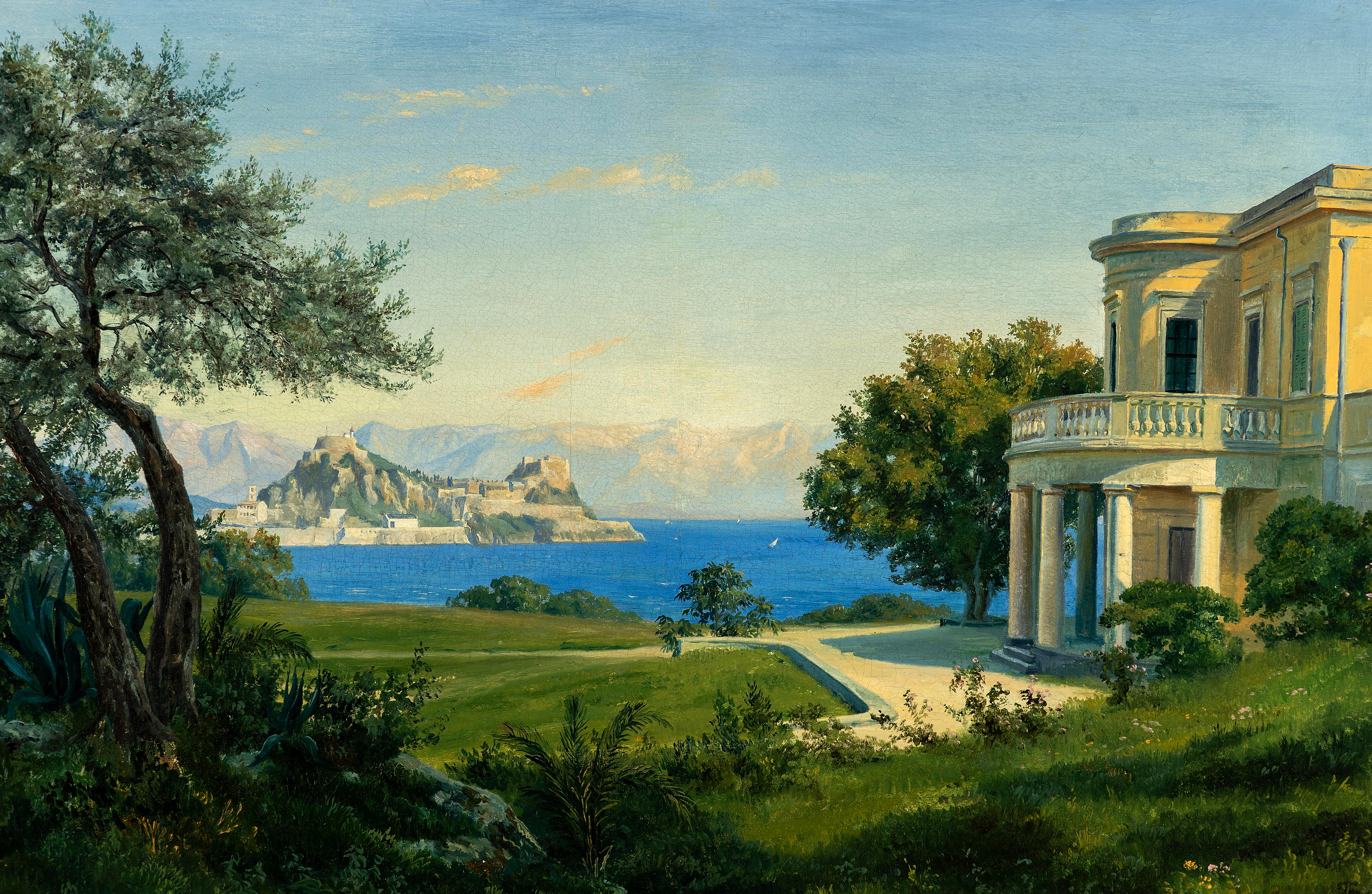
Villa Mon Repos with Corfu city in the back by Thorald Læssøe (around 1876)

=== British High Commissioners ===
The villa was built as a summer residence for the British Lord High Commissioner of the United States of the Ionian Islands, Frederick Adam, and his second wife (a Corfiot), Diamantina 'Nina' Palatino, in 1828–1831, although they had to vacate the villa soon afterwards in 1832 when Adam was sent to serve in Madras, India. The neoclassical design was made by Colonel George Whitmore, who was also the architect of the Palace of St. Michael and St. George on Spianada Square in Corfu City, along with civil engineer J. Harper. The villa was rarely used as a residence for later British governors.

In 1833, the School of Fine Arts was relocated to the estate, with Corfiot sculptor Pavlos Prosalentis serving as director, and in 1834, public gardens were established on the estate's farmland. In 1840, during the tenure of Lord Howard Douglas as High Commissioner, the Theological Seminary was moved there, where it remained for two years.

In 1863 and several times afterward, the Empress of Austria, Elisabeth of Austria, stayed at the villa. Here she fell in love with the island, where she later built the Achilleion Palace, in the village of Gastouri.

=== Royal residence ===
After the union with Greece in 1864, the villa and the gardens were gifted to King George I of the Hellenes as a summer residence; he renamed it "Mon Repos" (French for "My Rest"). The Greek royal family used it as a summer residence up until King Constantine II fled the country in 1967. The villa subsequently became derelict, but was restored in the 1990s.

Additionally, Mon Repos hosted prime ministers, kings, and princes from Spain and the United Kingdom. It is said that the guesthouse, which is a second building next to the main villa, was named "Tito" after the leader of Yugoslavia.

Several royal births have taken place at the villa, including those of Princess Sophie of Greece and Denmark on 26 June 1914, Prince Philip, Duke of Edinburgh (the husband of Queen Elizabeth II) on 10 June 1921, and Princess Alexia of Greece and Denmark on 10 July 1965. Philip was born on the dining room table.

=== Confiscation ===
The villa was confiscated under controversial circumstances some years after the declaration of the Third Hellenic Republic in 1974. Its confiscation, and the confiscation of other property of the deposed and exiled King Constantine II, without any compensation, led to a court case in the European Court of Human Rights.

The King's argument centred on the claim that the property in question was acquired by his predecessors legally and was therefore subject to regular personal inheritance. The Greek state argued that because the property was either used by the royal family by virtue of its sovereign status or obtained by taking advantage of that status, once the monarchy was abolished, the property reverted to public ownership automatically.

The Court ordered the Hellenic Republic to pay the exiled king compensation of less than 1% of its worth and allowed the Greek state to retain ownership of the property.

== Today ==
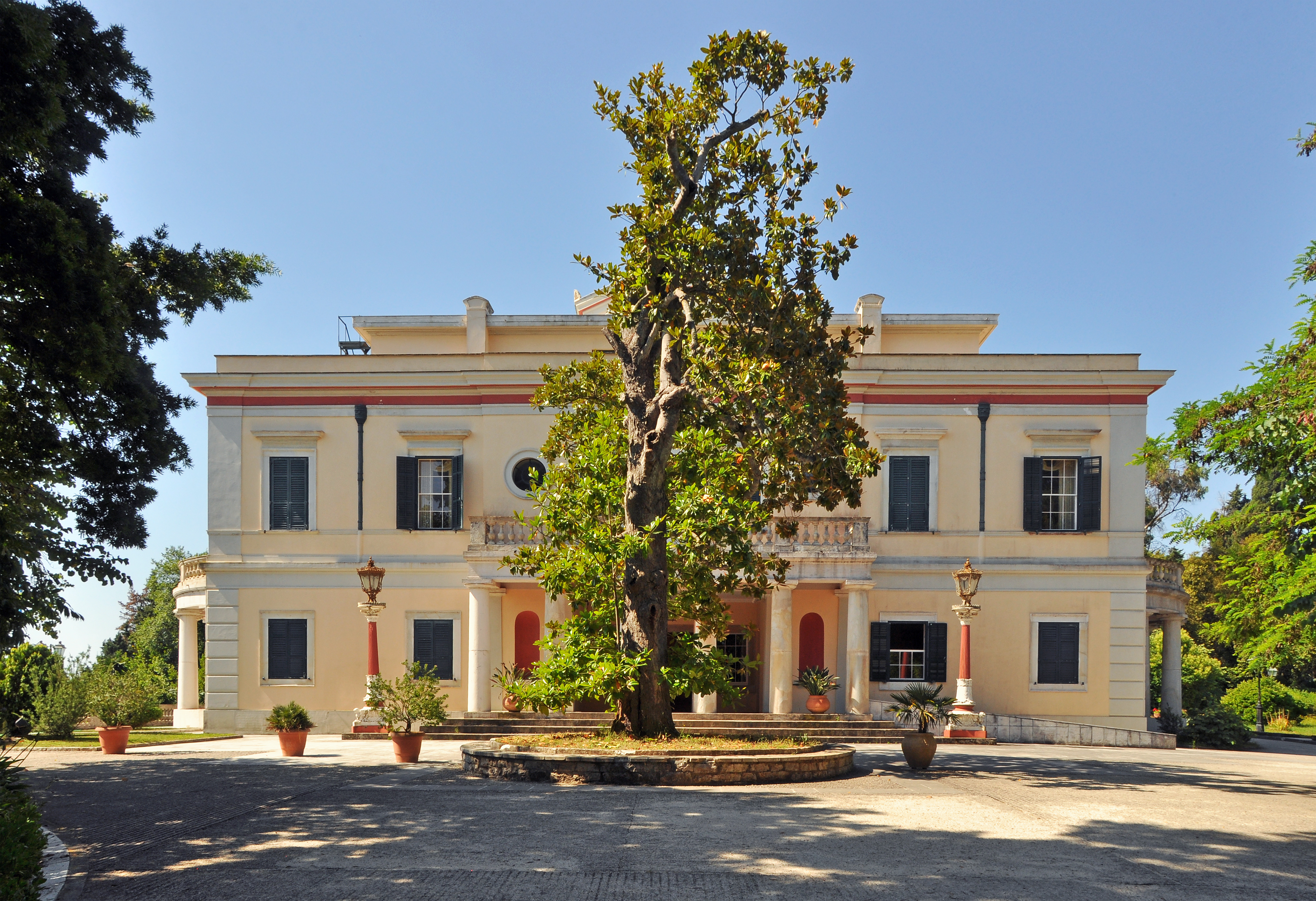
The entrance facade facing the sea

The royal villa nowadays houses the Museum of Palaiopolis, which opened in 2001.

On the ground floor, visitors can experience the atmosphere of the 19th century, with portraits, furniture, and a dress belonging to the palace's first resident, Diamantina-Nina Palatianou, Lady Adams, as well as her personal items (a donation from the Palatianou family to the museum). Through these exhibits, visitors can gain an understanding of the lifestyle and character of the people in the early decades of the 19th century.

On the first floor of the museum, visitors can view the exhibition of archaeological artifacts found during excavations in the Palaiopolis area. These objects serve as a source of inspiration, research, and study of ancient Corfu, ranging from the Archaic to the Roman period.

== Architecture ==
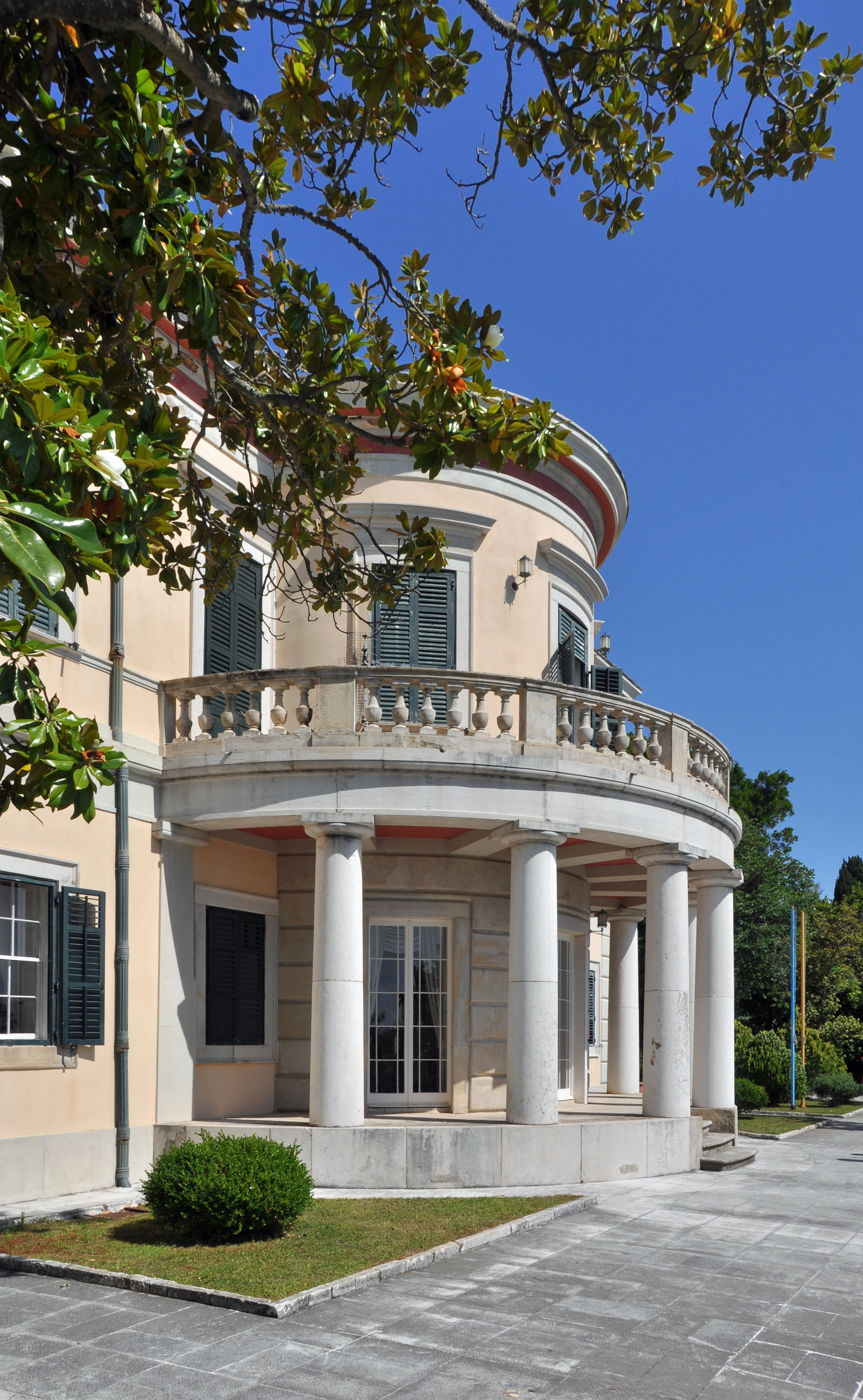
The facade facing the sea

The building is characterized by strict symmetry, composed of two solid masses. The villa, the main mass, is a three-story luxurious structure built in the neoclassical architectural style that prevailed during the English Regency. The building features simple lines with large openings, placing it among the early neoclassical buildings of Greece.

=== Interior ===
Upon entering through the main door of the building, one notices the columned hall, which leads to the other rooms and, via a beautiful staircase, to the second floor. The visitor can find the ticket office to the right of the main hall and then continue exploring the space. The remaining rooms serve as exhibition spaces, and it is worth visiting the inner atrium, which is located at the back of the building. The atrium substitutes, to some extent, for the natural environment, an impression supported by the existing artistic plant decoration. On the ground floor, objects related to the life and former use of the building are on display. These include rare documents, paintings, furniture, and findings related to the building, such as collections of 19th-century artworks, as mentioned earlier in broad terms.

Finally, the visitor can view the photography exhibition, which includes images from the excavations in the ancient city of Corfu. This material relates to the trade, daily life, and worship practices of the people of Corfu during antiquity.

Ascending from the main columned hall to the second floor, one is impressed by the wooden spiral staircase. On this floor, additional exhibitions with more modern themes are housed. In this area, temporary exhibitions and educational programs are also organized.

In the second building, which was used as a guesthouse and is named "Tito", the conservation workshops for archaeological finds are housed. There is also a small storage room that contains rare objects, which are displayed periodically.

== Gallery: the Palace interior ==
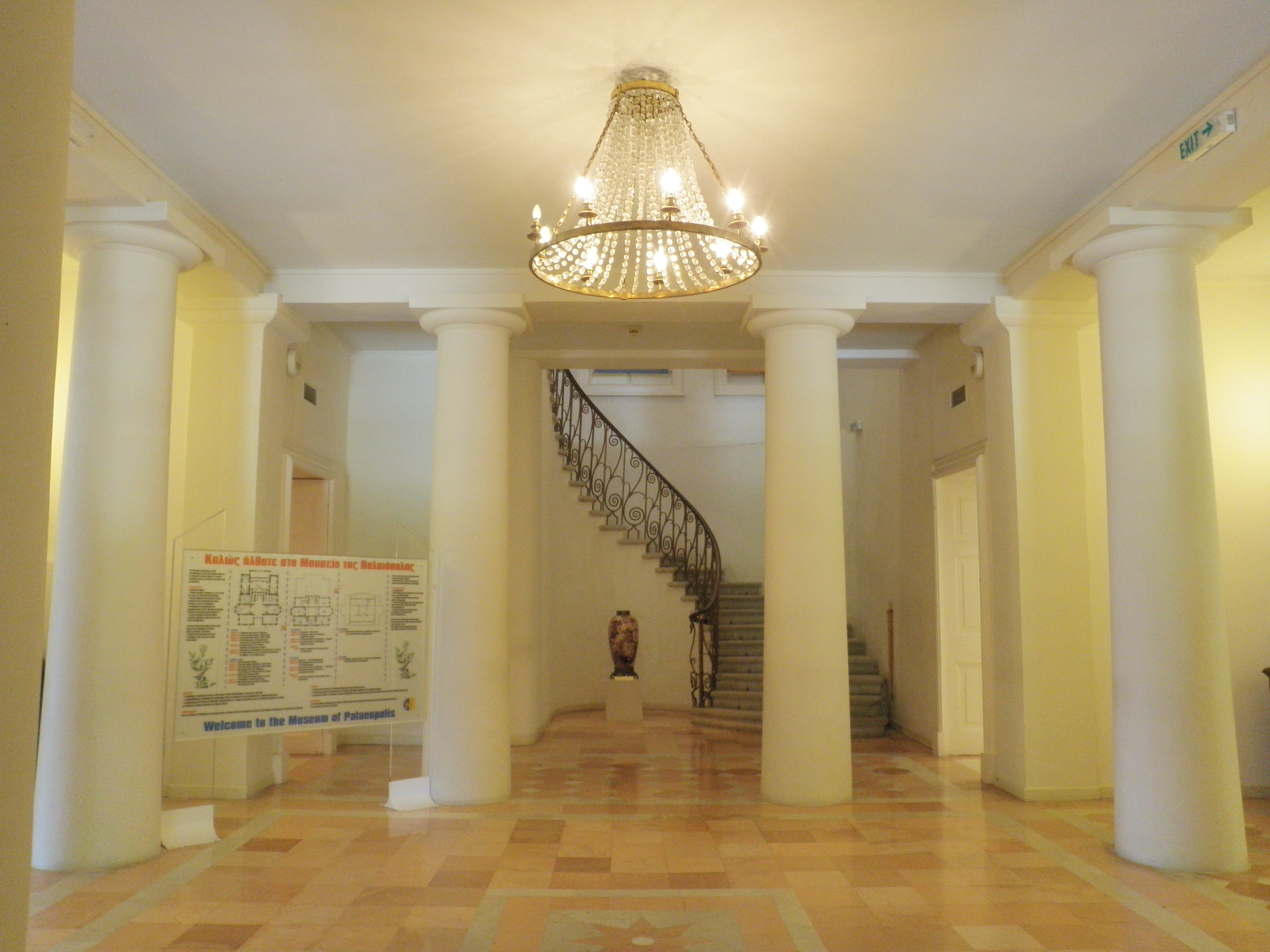
The vestibule

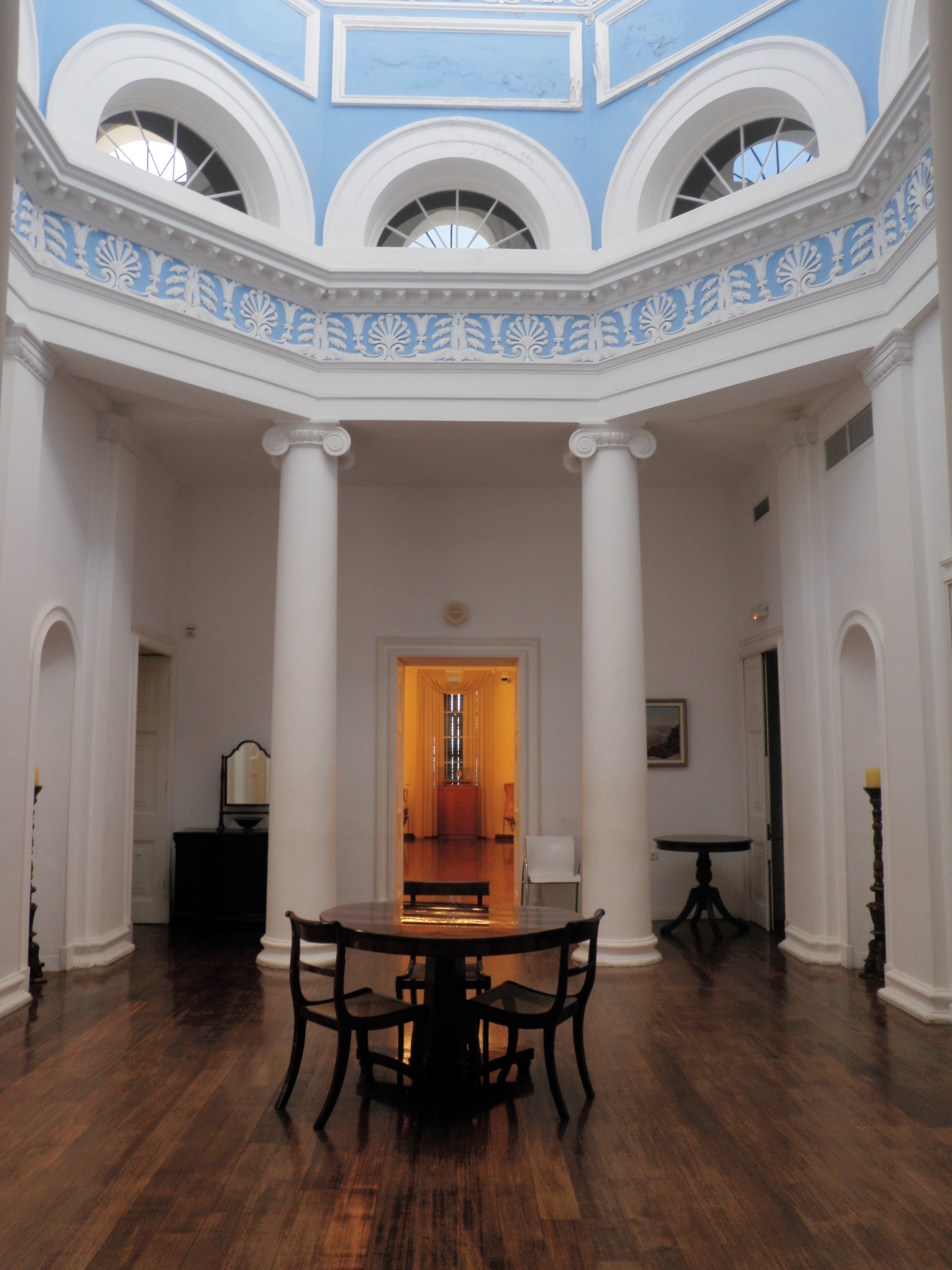
The central hall on the second floor

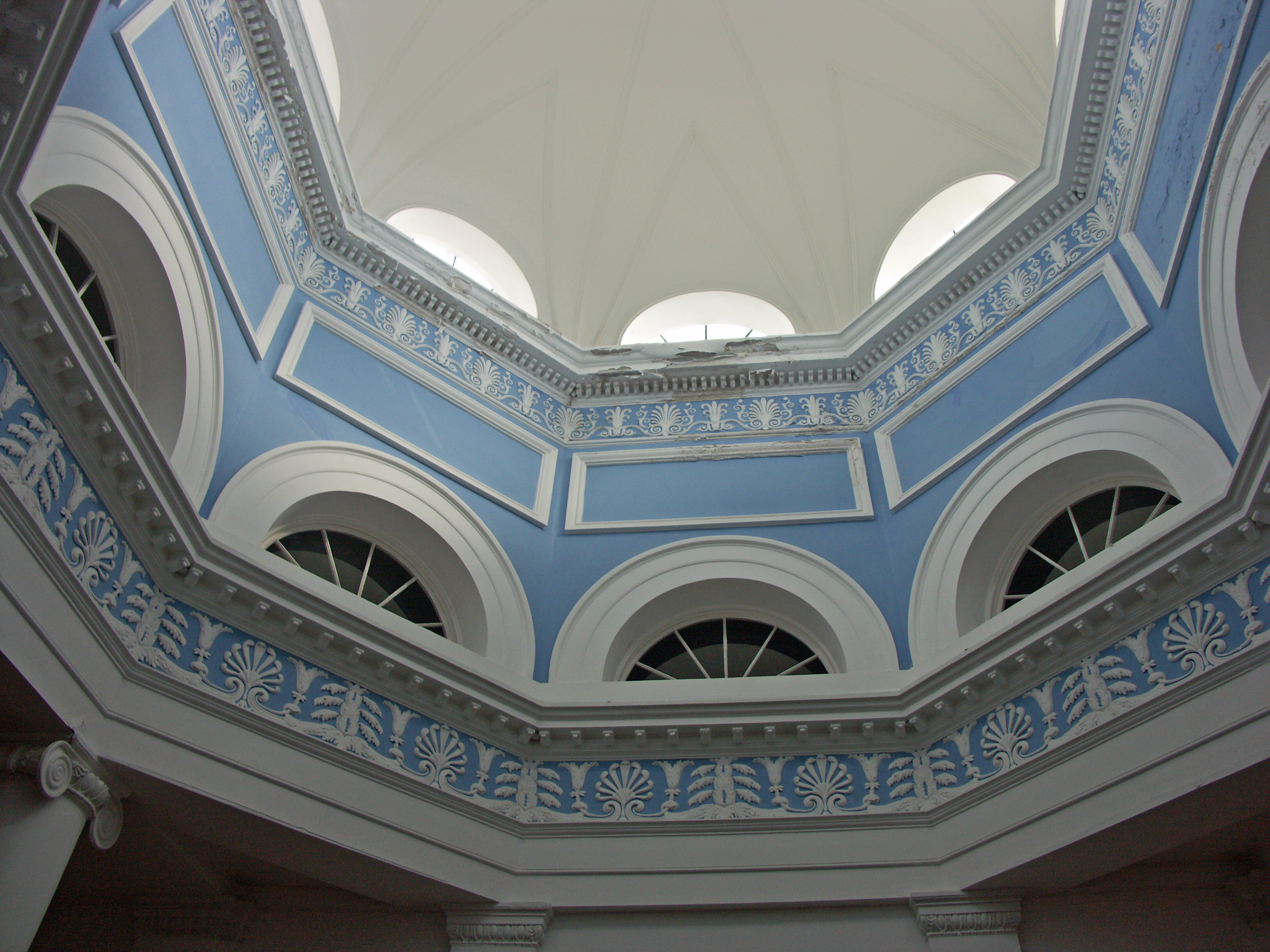

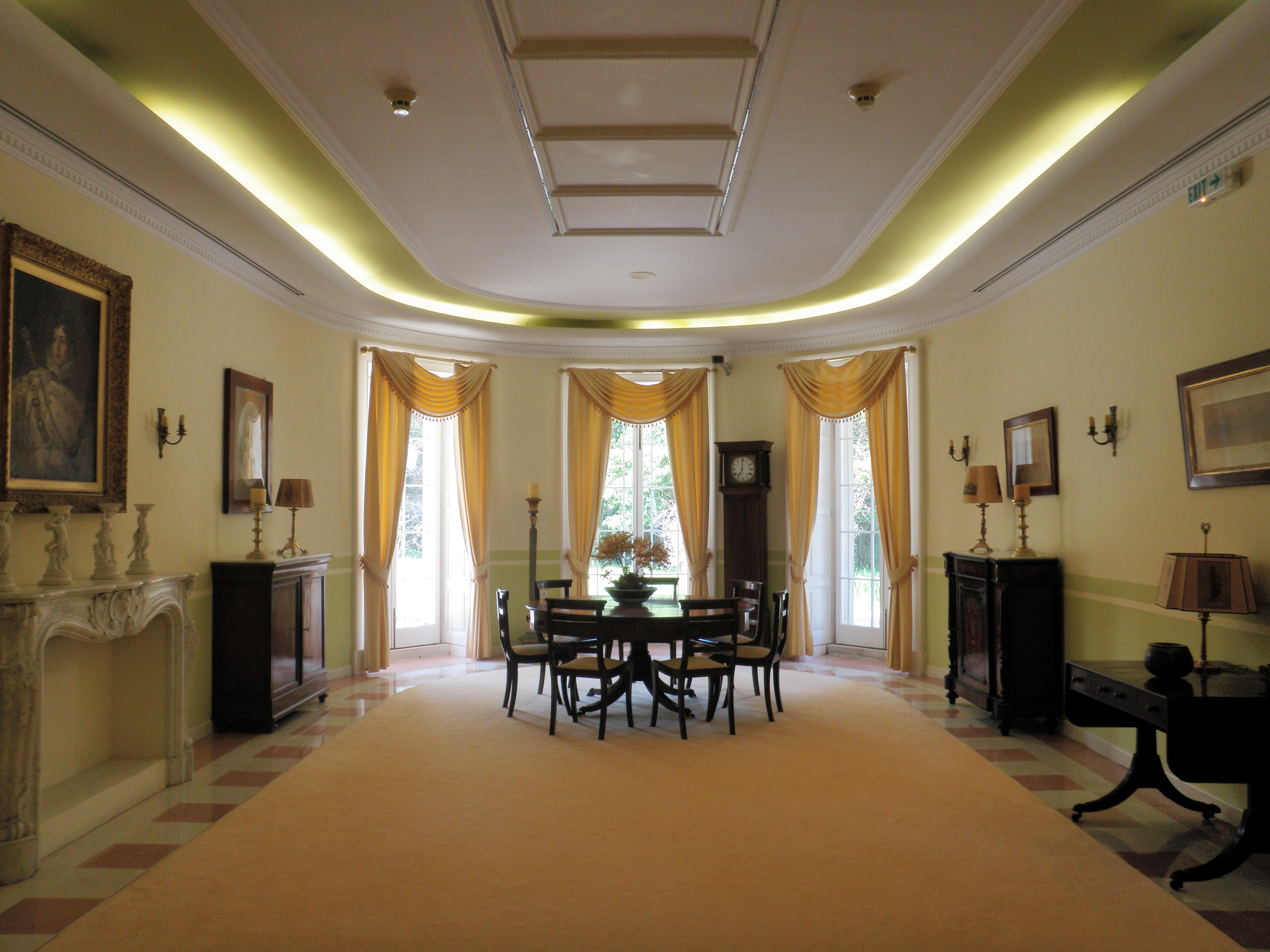

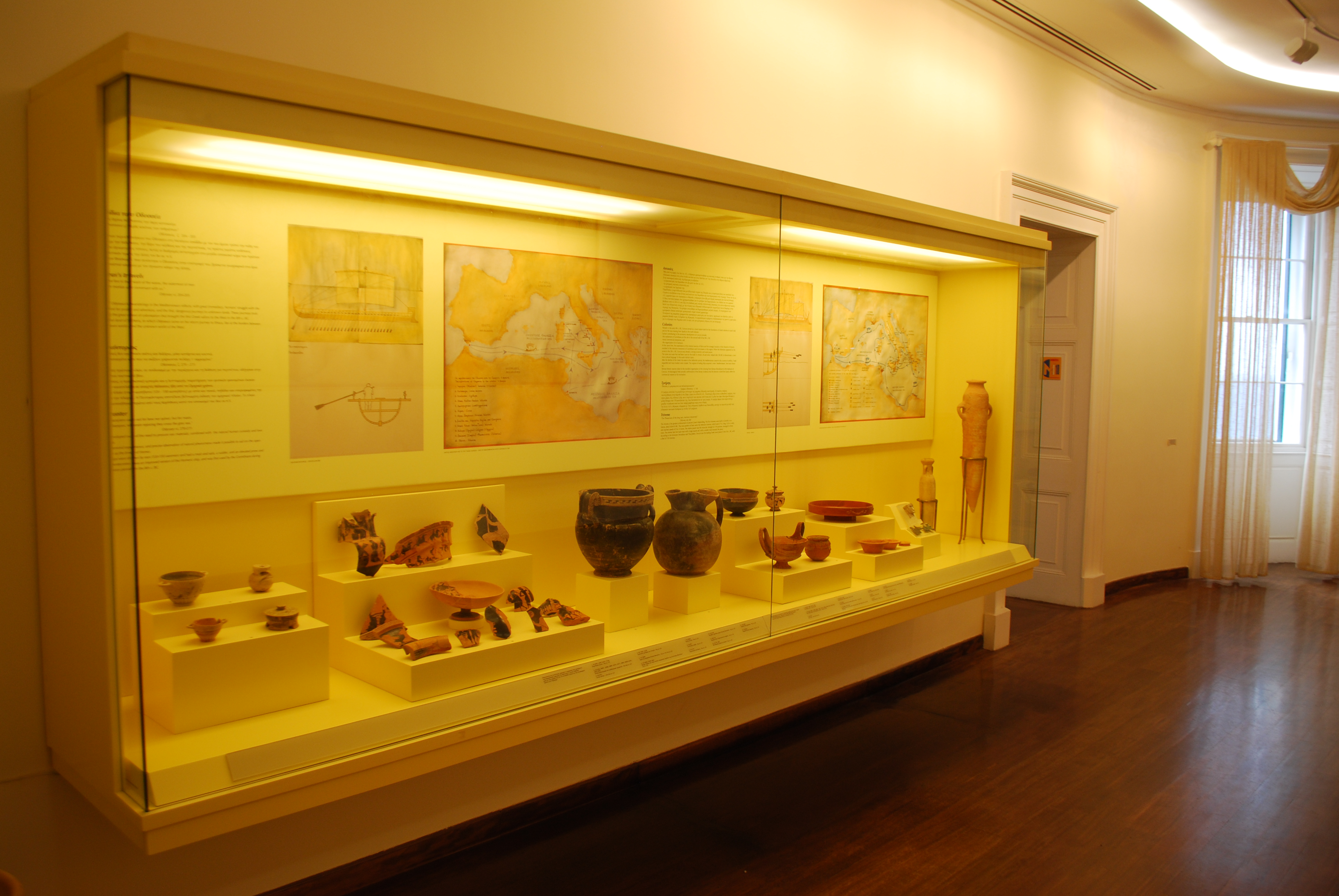
