= Pavlos, Crown Prince of Greece =

Head of the Royal House of Greece since 2023

Pavlos
- Crown Prince of Greece
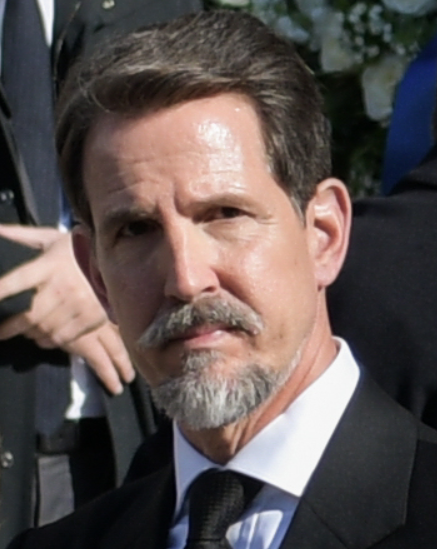
- Pavlos at his father's funeral in 2023

Head of the Royal House of Greece
- Tenure: 10 January 2023 – present
- Predecessor: Constantine II
- Heir apparent: Constantine-Alexios
- Born: 20 May 1967 (age 59); Tatoi Palace, Athens, Kingdom of Greece
- Spouse: Marie-Chantal Miller (m. 1995)
- Issue: Princess Maria-Olympia; Prince Constantine-Alexios; Prince Achileas-Andreas; Prince Odysseas-Kimon; Prince Aristides-Stavros
- House: Glücksburg
- Father: Constantine II of Greece
- Mother: Anne-Marie of Denmark
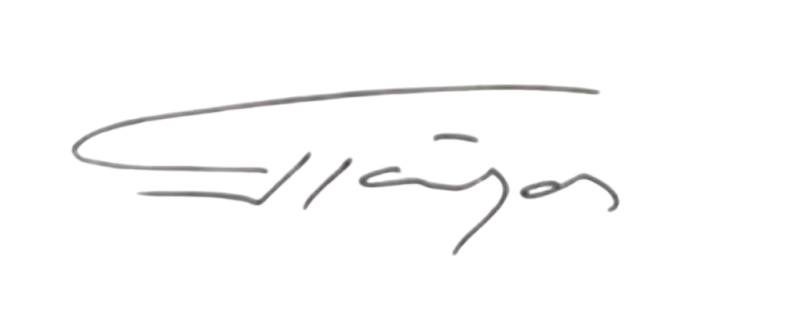
- Signature

Pavlos, Crown Prince of Greece, Prince of Denmark (Note: Internationally and familiarly, he is known as "Crown Prince Pavlos of Greece". In Greece, he is referred to as "Pavlos de Grèce". As a male-line descendant of King Christian IX of Denmark, he is legally a Danish prince, although he is not in the line of succession to the Danish throne. Although it is rare, some media outlets anglicize his name as Paul.) (Greek: Παύλος Ντε Γκρες, romanized: Pavlos de Grèce; born 20 May 1967), is a Greek financier who is the former heir apparent to the defunct throne of Greece, becoming the Head of the Royal House of Greece upon his father's death on 10 January 2023. Pavlos was Crown Prince of Greece and heir apparent to the Greek throne from birth until the monarchy's abolition.

Pavlos was born in Athens as the second child and eldest son of the last King of Greece, Constantine II, and his wife Queen Anne-Marie. Pavlos was born into an unstable era for Greek politics, just shy of turning eight months old when he and his family were sent into exile, after Constantine II staged a failed counter-coup against the military junta, a regime that had taken power about a month before Pavlos's birth. They first lived in Rome, before eventually settling in Copenhagen, where his family lived with Pavlos's maternal grandparents, King Frederik IX and Queen Ingrid of Denmark. Although he and his family were in exile since December 1967, his parents continued to officially reign as King and Queen of the Hellenes from 1967 until 1973, when the military junta abolished the Greek monarchy and established the Third Hellenic Republic as its successor state. A democratic referendum following the fall of the military regime had taken place in December 1974, which resulted in the definitive dissolution of the monarchy. Following the abolition of the monarchy, Pavlos and his siblings grew up in London.

On 1 July 1995, Pavlos married Marie-Chantal Miller. They have five children: Maria-Olympia, Constantine-Alexios, Achileas-Andreas, Odysseas-Kimon, and Aristides-Stavros. Pavlos is closely related to many European royals. Queens Margrethe II of Denmark and Sofía of Spain are his aunts, and Kings Felipe VI of Spain and Frederik X of Denmark are his first cousins.

== Early life ==
Pavlos was born on 20 May 1967 at the Tatoi Palace north of Athens, used at the time as the secondary residence of the Greek royal family. He was the second child and first son of King Constantine II of Greece and Queen Anne-Marie of Greece. Constantine II had ascended the throne on 6 March 1964, aged 23, following the death of his father and predecessor, Paul, so Pavlos was crown prince from birth. In traditional Greek naming practices, first sons are often named after their paternal grandfathers. His mother is the youngest sister of the Danish queen Margrethe II, and his father was the brother of Sofía, the former queen consort of Spain. His maternal grandparents were Frederik IX of Denmark and his queen consort, Ingrid of Sweden.

Pavlos displaced his older sister, Alexia, as heir to the throne due to Greece's order of succession adhering to male-preference primogeniture.

== Crown Prince ==
Pavlos was born into a turbulent era in Greek politics, barely a month after a coup d'état which ended democratic rule in Greece over the king's objections on 21 April 1967, ushering in a military junta, led by Georgios Papadopoulos. In December of that year, Constantine attempted a counter-coup that failed due to planning mistakes, leaks, and insufficient military support. Pursued by the junta, Constantine fled with his wife, children, mother and sister to Rome. They then went to Copenhagen and lived with Anne-Marie's mother, Queen Ingrid. From 1967 to 1973, Greece officially remained a monarchy, with a regency appointed while the king lived in exile.

Following the discovery and suppression of a "wide-ranging" anti-junta movement, just before its outbreak, among the ranks of the mostly royalist Navy, Papadopoulos, on 1 June 1973, declared Greece a presidential republic with himself as president and proclaimed a referendum for 29 July 1973 on the issue of the monarchy. The referendum was held without opposition and its result confirmed the regime change, with Constantine becoming "officially" deposed. On 17 November 1974, after the fall of the dictatorship, the 1974 Greek legislative election was held, resulting in a victory for Constantine Karamanlis and his New Democracy party. Less than a month later, on 8 December, the Greek plebiscite of 1974 confirmed the referendum of the previous year: the majority voted for a republic (69%) with a minority voting for the restoration of the monarchy (31%).

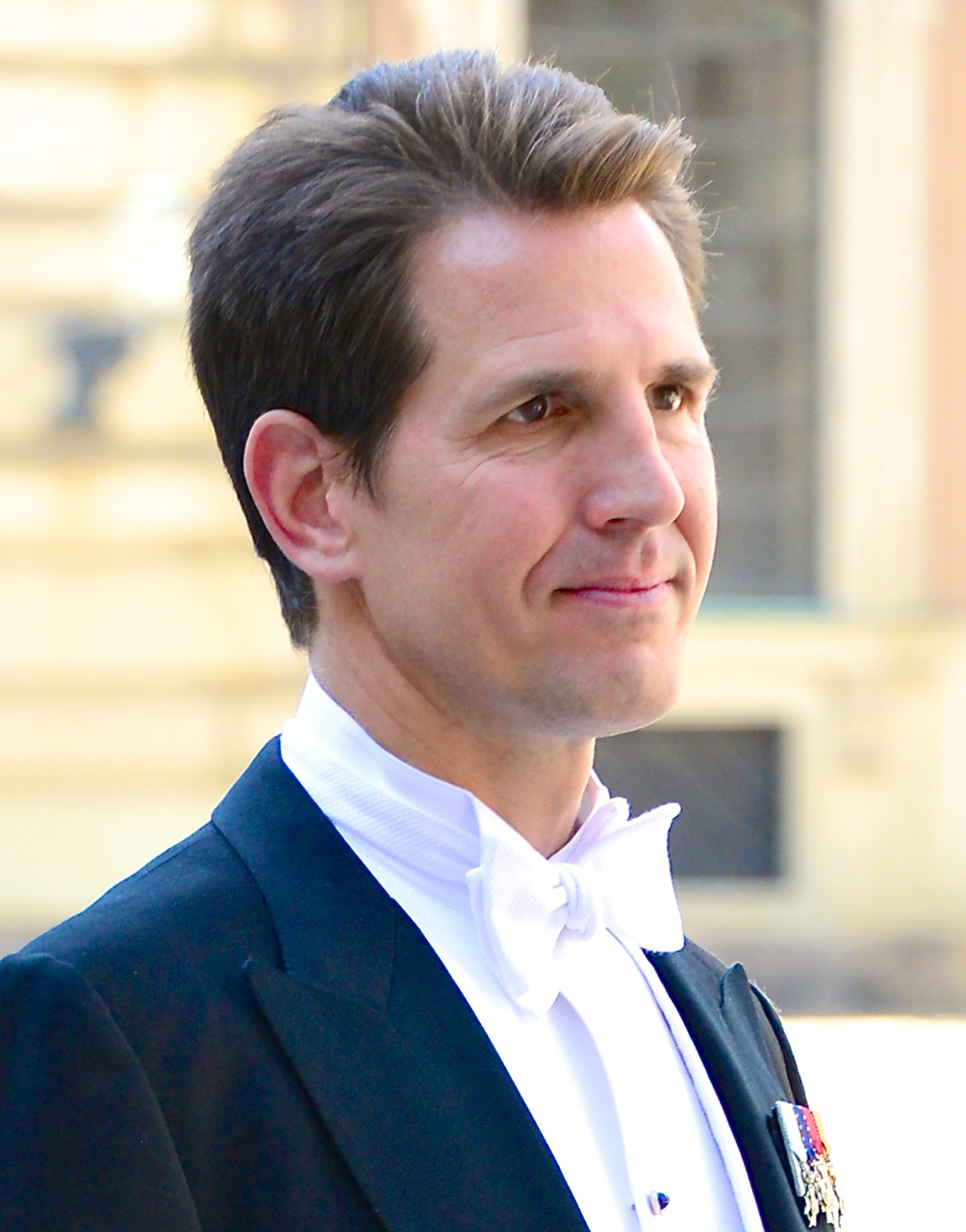
Pavlos in 2013

Constantine announced that he "respects" the "decision of the Greek people." Yet, from 1975 until early 1978 he was involved in conspiracies to overthrow the government and the republican constitution via a military coup, which eventually did not materialize. He and Anne-Marie had been living with their family in London for several years. Pavlos's youngest siblings were born in London: Theodora in 1983 and Philippos in 1986. Pavlos was educated at the Hellenic College of London, founded by his parents in 1980. (Note: The Hellenic College of London, due to declining attendance of British Greek students, was succeeded by the Knightsbridge School, which, in turn was succeeded, in 2008, by Knightsbridge Schools International.) He attended the Armand Hammer United World College of the American West, Montezuma, New Mexico, in the U.S., from 1984 to 1986. After training at the British Army's Royal Military Academy Sandhurst, he was commissioned a second lieutenant in the Royal Scots Dragoon Guards in 1987 on a three-year short-service commission. He was promoted to lieutenant in April 1989, and relinquished his commission in April 1990. In 1993, he completed a bachelor's degree at the Georgetown University School of Foreign Service.

On 11 May 1994, the Greek Government under prime-minister Andreas Papandreou renounced the Greek-citizenship status of Pavlos, alongside Constantine, and the rest of the former royal family through law 2215/1994. The law stated that Constantine's Greek-citizenship status, and accordingly his family's, could only be restored under specific conditions, including the selection of an explicit surname. The following year, while sharing a house in Washington, DC, he and his cousin, Felipe VI of Spain, then Prince of Asturias, attended Georgetown University, where both obtained a Master of Science in Foreign Service. After, Pavlos lived between New York City and London, working as an investment consultant. He is co-founder (Note: The other founder being Peter DeSorcy) of Ortelius Advisors, an activist hedge fund.

== Head of the Greek royal family ==
Following the death of his father on 10 January 2023, Pavlos delivered Constantine's eulogy during the funeral ceremony and carried his coffin with his brothers, sons and nephews at the burial. A rumour circulated that Pavlos intended to permanently relocate to Greece, but this was later denied by the spokesperson of the former Greek royal family, Ivi Macris, as "completely false". On 22 January, Pavlos spoke to French magazine Point de Vue regarding his new role. In the interview, Pavlos thanked the public for their respect towards the Greek royal family and said that those who crowded the funeral, whether they were "monarchists or not", "paid tribute to a historical personality, a part of Greek history." When asked about the role he sees himself upholding in Greek society, Pavlos explained that he would "not take on an official role", but will "uphold the family's exemplary." He added that his eldest son Constantine-Alexios would not take on any official role either, but would "follow his grandfather's example and be a good man."

Pavlos issued a statement about the Tempi train collision in February 2023, which caused the death of almost 60 people, styling himself Head of the former Royal House of Greece following Constantine's death. The statement read: "Today all of Greece is mourning. Our thoughts and prayers are with the families who lost loved ones to this unimaginable tragedy and with the injured who we sincerely hope to be released from the hospital soon." Pavlos also thanked the rescue and medical teams involved for their "superhuman efforts", before giving his "heartbroken" condolences to the families who lost their children in the accident and asking God to bless them all. Soon after, as Pavlos was leaving Athens that month, it was revealed that he and his family had been searching for a home in Greece, with Pavlos telling journalists that he had not "found a house yet".

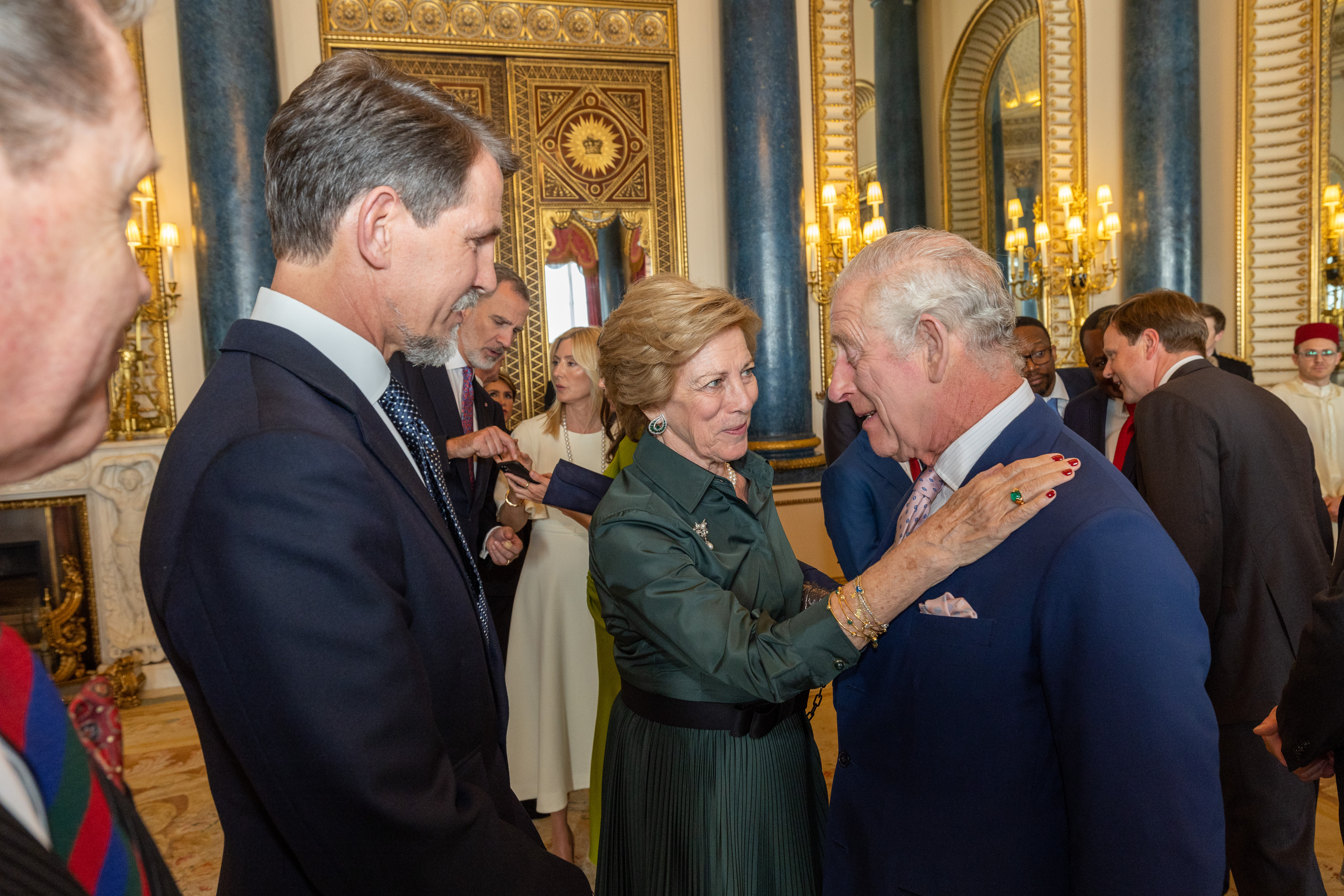
Pavlos (left) and his mother, Anne-Marie (middle), at the coronation reception of Charles III (right). (Note: Pavlos's wife, Marie-Chantal, and first cousin, Felipe VI of Spain, are in the background between Pavlos and Anne-Marie.)

In April 2023, Pavlos attended a Greek Orthodox Easter service in the Hamptons, where his sons Constantine-Alexios and Odysseas-Kimon were holding the Epitaphios. Pavlos attended the coronation of Charles III and Camilla in May with his mother and wife.

On 3 July 2023 at 11:45pm, Pavlos and his brother, Nikolaos, appeared in a special edition of 365 Moments, a Greek television series hosted by Sofia Papaioannou. The episode marked the first interview with Pavlos and Nikolaos since their father's death, and it discussed the passing of their father, their stripped Greek citizenship and their surname. Pavlos described his father as "strict but very loving" and said that despite being forced into exile, he still wanted to help his family. Pavlos also announced that he was now living in Greece again, which is what he "always wanted to". He explained that the opportunity to live in Greece occurred as his job allowed for overseas work. When asked whether he accepted the last name "Glücksburg", Pavlos said that he would never see it as his name. He called it, "a family lineage. Denmark's family name is not that. It is one of the castles of the family's origin." He explained that throughout his life, he never introduced himself with a last name, but rather called himself "Pavlos of Greece". Pavlos also added that he was "very interested in [Greek] politics", but would never become involved, has no political association and would always long for his Greek passport to be returned.

Pavlos and Marie-Chantal attended the 2023 British Fashion Awards. There, Pavlos was spotted with a black eye patch covering his left eye. The day prior, Marie-Chantal posted to Instagram a close-up photo of his eye patch, saying, "Hopefully a temporary new look, but he’s kind of cute". Following worry online, Pavlos announced on Instagram that he had undergone a retinal detachment surgery. After thanking people for their support and wishes, Pavlos explained that the surgery was "successful", however he would be unable to travel and therefore have to spend Christmas in London. Between January and February 2024, Pavlos and his family attended three memorial services to mark the one year anniversary of Constantine's death — one in Athens and two in London, including a thanksgiving service. After a memorial service the following day, Pavlos and Nikolaos were interviewed by ANT1 reporter Isaac Karipidis. They both thanked the public for their support. On 28 September 2024, Pavlos served as a groomsman at the wedding of Princess Theodora and Matthew Kumar at the Metropolitan Cathedral.

On 19 December 2024, Pavlos, his five children and his four siblings submitted an application for Greek citizenship, which had been stripped from the family in 1994. Pavlos's mother, Anne-Marie, did not apply, as she was reportedly "not interested". Under law, Pavlos and his family, in order to receive citizenship, must pledge allegiance to the republican constitution and adopt a surname. Ultimately, the surname of "Ντε Γκρες" (transliteration of De Grèce, meaning "of Greece") was chosen. It was reported by the royal family that this surname was chosen as it was the one used by the late Prince Michael of Greece and Denmark, and so was the "only familiar one" to them. The following day, Pavlos's citizenship, alongside that of his children and siblings, was reinstated according to the provisions of the 1994 law by order of the Minister of the Interior, Theodoros Livanios. The reinstatement of their citizenship meant that those eligible must complete mandatory military conscription. Deputy Minister Pavlos Marinakis said to Action 24 that the ex-royal family's "request was made in accordance with the law", while the left-wing SYRIZA party stated "the choice of family name is problematic". The Communist Party of Greece and PASOK also criticized the government's decision. Athens University Constitutional Law Emeritus Professor Nikos Alivizatos also criticized the decision of the Minister of the Interior arguing that it did not fulfill the requirements of the 1994 law, because "Ντε Γκρες" was not a "regular surname", but "a declaration of place of origin" and a title of distinction, such as those used by royalty and aristocrats, something that goes against the Greek Constitution. In February 2025, Athens University Administrative Law Professor Panos Lazaratos lodged an objection against the recognition of the surname filed by the members of the former royal family, arguing that it constitutes a form of indirect discrimination against all other citizens, and that it was unlawful to give them Greek citizenship.

== Personal life ==
Dual Cypher of Pavlos and his wife Marie-Chantal

Pavlos married American heiress Marie-Chantal Miller, whom he had met at a party three years earlier in New Orleans, on 1 July 1995. The Greek Orthodox wedding at Saint Sophia Cathedral, London drew a rare modern panoply of royalty, but the ceremony proved to be legally invalid and had eventually to be repeated civilly (not normally required in the UK) in Chelsea because of a law requiring that marriages in England be conducted in English.

After their marriage, the couple took up residence in Greenwich, Connecticut, the job that Pavlos obtained with the Charles R. Weber ship-broking company being headquartered there. Later, he went to work at a New York City firm as an investment portfolio manager, before relocation to London for their children's education in 2004.

The couple has five children: Maria-Olympia (b. 1996), Constantine-Alexios (b. 1998), Achileas-Andreas (b. 2000), Odysseas-Kimon (b. 2004), and Aristidis-Stavros (b. 2008).

Pavlos is a bluewater yachtsman and crews on the multi-record-breaking monohull Mari-Cha IV, owned by his father-in-law; businessman Robert W. Miller.

== Titles, styles, and honours ==
From birth, Pavlos was the heir apparent to the throne of Greece and as such he was referred to as the Crown Prince of Greece with the style of Royal Highness. Following the deposition of the Greek monarchy in 1973, these titles and styles are no longer legally recognised by the government of the Hellenic Republic. Through his male-line descent from Christian IX of Denmark, he is also a Prince of Denmark with the style of Highness.

=== Dynastic orders ===
- (Greece) Greek royal family:
  - Grand Master of the Royal Order of the Redeemer
  - Grand Master of the Royal Family Order of Saints George and Constantine
  - Grand Master of the Royal Order of George I
  - Grand Master of the Royal Order of the Phoenix

=== Foreign honours ===
- Denmark:
  - Knight of the Order of the Elephant (14 January 1997)
  - Recipient of the Commemorative Medal of the Silver Jubilee of Queen Margrethe II

== Bibliography ==
- Hindley, Geoffrey (2000). The Royal Families of Europe. New York: Caroll & Graf. ISBN 0-7867-0828-X.
- Paget, Gerald (1977). The Lineage and Ancestry of H.R.H. Prince Charles, Prince of Wales (2 vols). Edinburgh: Charles Skilton. ISBN 978-0-284-40016-1.
- Woodhouse, C.M. (1998). Modern Greece a Short History. London: Faber & Faber. ISBN 0-571-19794-9.
- Γιάννης Κάτρης (1974). Η γέννηση του νεοφασισμού στην Ελλάδα 1960–1970. Athens: Παπαζήση.
- Αλέξης Παπαχελάς (1997). Ο βιασμός της ελληνικής δημοκρατίας. Athens:Εστία. ISBN 960-05-0748-1.
- Καδδάς, Αναστάσιος Γ. "Η Ελληνική Βασιλική Οικογένεια", Εκδόσεις Φερενίκη (2010)
- Ανδρέας Μέγκος "Εραλδικά Σύμβολα και Διάσημα του Βασιλείου της Ελλάδος", Εκδόσεις Στέμμα (2015)
- Εκδόσεις Στέμμα, "Κανονισμός Εθιμοταξίας και Τελετών της Βασιλικής Αυλής" (2016)

Pavlos, Crown Prince of Greece House of Schleswig-Holstein-Sonderburg-Glücksburg Cadet branch of the House of Oldenburg Born: 20 May 1967
Greek royalty
Preceded by Alexia	Crown Prince of Greece; 20 May 1967 – 1 June 1973	Abolition of the monarchy in 1973/74
Preceded by Constantine II	Head of the Greek royal family 10 January 2023 – present	Incumbent; Heir: Constantine Alexios
