= Prince Constantine-Alexios of Greece and Denmark =

Member of the Greek former royal family (born 1998)

Prince Constantine-Alexios
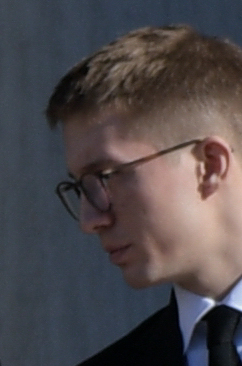
- Constantine-Alexios at his grandfather's funeral in 2023
- Born: 29 October 1998 (age 27); Weill Cornell Medical Center, New York City, U.S.
- House: Glücksburg
- Father: Pavlos, Crown Prince of Greece
- Mother: Marie-Chantal Miller

Prince Constantine-Alexios of Greece and Denmark (Greek: Κωνσταντίνος Αλέξιος Ντε Γκρες, romanized: Konstantínos-Aléxios de Grèce; born 29 October 1998) is a Greek painter, sculptor, and member of the former Greek royal family. He is the eldest son and second child of Crown Prince Pavlos and Crown Princess Marie-Chantal of Greece.

== Early life and education ==
Constantine-Alexios was born on 29 October 1998 at Weill Cornell Medical Center in New York City and is the eldest son and second child of Crown Prince Pavlos and Crown Princess Marie-Chantal of Greece. He is a grandson of Constantine II and Anne-Marie of Denmark, who were the last King and Queen of the Hellenes. In traditional Greek naming practices, first sons are named for their paternal grandfathers.

Constantine-Alexios was christened in a Greek Orthodox ceremony at St. Sophia's Cathedral, London, on 15 April 1999. His godparents are Prince Nikolaos of Greece and Denmark; Prince Dimitri of Yugoslavia; King Frederik X of Denmark, King Felipe VI of Spain; William, Prince of Wales; Victoria, Crown Princess of Sweden; Princess Alexandra zu Fürstenberg; and Doris Robbs. Two of his godparents are prospective monarchs and two are reigning kings.

Constantine-Alexios grew up in London from the age of four, and began his education at Wetherby School in London but later he attended Wellington College where he graduated in 2017. At Wellington he also received military education. In August 2017, he enrolled at Georgetown University and his father, mother and siblings moved to New York with him. A year before graduating, he announced he wanted to study in the United States. He graduated from Georgetown University in May 2022.

== Career ==
Constantine-Alexios has modeled for Dior, including for fashion photographer Nikolai von Bismarck for the book The Dior Sessions, which was the first book from Dior entirely with focus on men's fashion from Dior Homme. All proceeds from the sale of the book were for the benefit of the Teenage Cancer Trust.

Constantine-Alexios paints and sculpts, often inspired by Greek mythology. He has more than 100,000 followers on Instagram. He is also known to have an interest in hunting, music and photography.

== Personal life ==
In March 2023, press speculated that Constantine-Alexios was in a relationship with British model and socialite Poppy Delevingne, indicating that Delevingne and her husband had separated permanently. In 2024, it was reported that he was in a relationship with American model Brooks Nader. Their relationship ended in mid-2025.

Οn 20 December 2024, Constantine-Alexios along with other members of the former royal family acquired Greek citizenship, under the surname de Grèce.

== Titles, styles, and honours ==
Constantine-Alexios may be styled "His Royal Highness Prince Constantine-Alexios of Greece and Denmark".
