= 1920 Greek referendum =

Vote returning Constantine I to the throne

Results
Choice	Votes	%
Yes	999,954	98.97%
No	10,383	1.03%
Valid votes	1,010,337	99.80%
Invalid or blank votes	2,000	0.20%
Total votes	1,012,337	100.00%

A referendum on the return of King Constantine I was held in Greece on Sunday, 5 December 1920 (22 November o.s.). It followed the death of his son, King Alexander. The proposal was approved by nearly 99% of voters. The anti-Venizelist parties had recently won the elections of 1920.

The result ensured and affirmed the dominance of the anti-Venizelist camp in the country. Constantine returned, albeit questioned by the supporters of the Liberal Party, while Liberal leader Eleftherios Venizelos maintained his silence, being in voluntary exile abroad. Constantine returned from Venice with the Greek cruiser Georgios Averof.

The return of Constantine I was opposed by the Entente powers (United Kingdom and France) because of his pro-German stance during World War I (see National Schism) and applied an economic blockade to Greece.

France began to support the Kemalists in the war against Greece, while Britain maintained a passive stance with only diplomatic support to the Greek kingdom. So his enthusiastic return was short-lived as a result of the disastrous military events that followed in the Asia Minor Campaign of 1922.. Constantine I abdicated on September 27, 1922 in favour of his eldest son, George II.

== Results ==
Choice	Votes	%
For	999,954	98.97
Against	10,383	1.03
Total	1,010,337	100.00
Valid votes	1,010,337	99.80
Invalid/blank votes	2,000	0.20
Total votes	1,012,337	100.00
Source: Nohlen & Stöver
