= List of Greek royal consorts =

Royal consorts of Greece

Consorts of the Kings of Greece were women married to the rulers of the Kingdom of Greece during their reign. All monarchs of modern Greece were male. The monarchy of Greece was abolished on 8 December 1974.

Greek consorts bore the title, Queen of the Hellenes and the style, Majesty. The following queens were spouses of the kings of modern Greece between 1836 and 1973:

== Queen consort of Greece ==
=== House of Wittelsbach (1832–1862) ===
Picture	Coat of arms	Name	Father	Birth	Marriage	Became consort	Ceased to be consort	Death	Spouse
		Amalia of Oldenburg	Augustus, Grand Duke of Oldenburg (Holstein-Gottorp)	21 December 1818	22 December 1836		24 October 1862 husband's disposition	20 May 1875	Otto

== Queens consort of the Hellenes ==
=== House of Glücksburg (1863–1973) ===
Picture	Coat of arms	Name	Greek name	Father	Birth	Marriage	Became consort	Ceased to be consort	Death	Spouse
		Olga of Russia	Ólga	Grand Duke Konstantin Nikolayevich of Russia (Romanov)	3 September 1851	27 October 1867		18 March 1913 husband's assassination	18 June 1926	George I
		Sophia of Prussia (first tenure)	Sofía	Frederick III, German Emperor (Hohenzollern)	14 June 1870	27 October 1889	18 March 1913 husband's accession	11 June 1917 husband's abdication	13 January 1932	Constantine I
		Aspasía Mánou (morganatic wife, created a Princess during widowhood)	Aspasía	Pétros Mános (Mános)	4 September 1896	4 November 1919		25 October 1920 husband's death	7 August 1972	Alexander
		Sophia of Prussia (second tenure)	Sofía	Frederick III, German Emperor (Hohenzollern)	14 June 1870	27 October 1889	19 December 1920 husband's reinstatement	27 September 1922 husband's abdication	13 January 1932	Constantine I
		Elizabeth of Romania	Elisávet	Ferdinand of Romania (Hohenzollern-Sigmaringen)	12 October 1894	27 February 1921	27 September 1922 husband's accession	25 March 1924 husband's exile	14 November/15 November 1956	George II
		Frederica of Hanover	Freideríki	Ernest Augustus III, Duke of Brunswick (Hanover)	18 April 1917	9 January 1938	1 April 1947 husband's accession	6 March 1964 husband's death	6 February 1981	Paul
		Anne-Marie of Denmark	Ánna-María	Frederik IX of Denmark (Glücksburg)	30 August 1946	18 September 1964		1 June 1973 monarchy abolished	living	Constantine II

== See also ==
- List of kings of Greece
- List of heads of state of Greece
- List of Roman and Byzantine empresses
- List of exiled and pretending Byzantine Empresses
