= 1862 Greek head of state referendum =

1862 Greek election for a new king

From 19 November 1862 (1 December New Style), a plebiscite was held in Greece in support of adopting Prince Alfred of the United Kingdom, later Duke of Edinburgh, as king. The results were announced in February 1863. Of the 240,000 votes reported, over 95% were in favour of the appointment. The previous king, Otto, who had been deposed in a popular revolt, received one vote. There were six votes for a Greek candidate and 93 for a republic.

Despite the apparently overwhelming result, the Great Powers of Britain, France and Russia refused to permit any member of their respective royal families to accept the Greek throne. Eventually, Prince William of Denmark, who had received six votes in the referendum, was appointed as the new "King of the Hellenes", assuming the name George I.

== Prelude ==
In October 1862, King Otto of Greece was deposed in a popular revolt, but while the Greek people rejected Otto, they did not seem averse to the concept of monarchy per se. Many Greeks, seeking closer ties to the pre-eminent world power, Great Britain, rallied around the idea that Prince Alfred, the second son of Queen Victoria and Prince Albert, could become the next king. British Foreign Secretary Lord Palmerston believed that the Greeks were "panting for increase in territory", hoping that the election of Alfred as king would also result in the incorporation of the Ionian Islands, which were then a British protectorate, into an enlarged Greek state.

The London Conference of 1832, however, had prohibited any of the Great Powers' ruling families from accepting the crown of Greece, and in any event, Queen Victoria was adamantly opposed to the idea. Nevertheless, the Greeks insisted on holding a plebiscite on the issue of the head of state in November 1862. It was the first referendum ever held in Greece.

== Results ==
The results were announced to the Greek National Assembly in February 1863. The number of votes differs slightly between reports, and the total votes reported sometimes exceeds the total in the official list. Differences arise through inaccuracies, misprints, and delays in the collection and count of votes. Votes were rarely if ever secret, and there were no uniformly printed ballot papers. Voters could write the name of their preference for king, and votes generally took the form of signed petitions.

Summary of the November 1862 Greek plebiscite	Votes	Source
Prince Alfred	230,016	
Prince Leuchtenberg	2,400	
An Eastern Orthodox King	1,917	
The Emperor of Russia	1,841	
Grand Duke Nicholas	1,821	
A King	1,763	
Prince Nicholas of Russia	1,741	
Long Live the Three Powers	482	
Grand Duke Constantine	478	
Prince Napoleon	345	
Prince Imperial of France	246	
A Republic	93	
Prince Amadeo of Italy	15	
A Russian Prince	14	
An Imperial Prince of Russia	9	
Romanoff	8	
Comte de Flandre	7	
Prince William of Denmark	6	
Prince Ypsilantis	6	
General Garibaldi	3	
The Duke of Aumale	3	
The Emperor Napoleon	2	
A Prince of Sweden	2	
Prince Joinville	1	
General M'Mahon	1	
Eynard the Philhellene	1	
Otto	1	
Total number of voters	241,202	

== Aftermath ==
Despite the apparently overwhelming support for Alfred, and the declaration by the Assembly that Alfred was elected as king, the Great Powers refused to alter their position, and Alfred declined the throne. The runner-up, Prince Leuchtenberg, as well as several of the other candidates, were also unacceptable to the Great Powers since they were members of the French and Russian royal families, also excluded from contention by the London Conference. The Greeks and Great Powers considered alternative candidates, and their choice eventually fell to Prince William of Denmark, who was the second son of Prince Christian of Denmark. William was elected unanimously by the Greek Assembly, becoming "George I, King of the Hellenes", and reigned for the next 50 years. Prince Alfred was created Duke of Edinburgh by his mother in 1866, and became the reigning Duke of Saxe-Coburg and Gotha in Germany in 1893.

At George's enthronement, the British government announced that they would cede the Ionian Islands to Greece as a goodwill gesture.
