= Wedding of Pavlos, Crown Prince of Greece, and Marie-Chantal Miller =

July 1995 royal wedding

- Pavlos, Crown Prince of Greece, and Marie-Chantal Miller on their wedding day
- Date: 1 July 1995
- Venue: St Sophia's Cathedral, London
- Location: London, England
- Participants: Pavlos, Crown Prince of Greece; Marie-Chantal Miller

The wedding of Pavlos, Crown Prince of Greece, Prince of Denmark, and Marie-Chantal Miller took place on 1 July 1995 at St Sophia's Cathedral, in London, England. The wedding ceremony, hosted by Miller's father, billionaire Robert Warren Miller, reportedly cost US$1.5 million and was attended by 1,400 guests. The wedding ceremony, receptions, and celebrations combined reportedly cost Miller $8 million. The wedding of Pavlos and Marie-Chantal brought together the largest gathering of royalty in London since the wedding of Elizabeth II and Prince Philip in 1947 and more monarchs were in attendance than at the wedding of Charles, Prince of Wales, and Lady Diana Spencer.

== Background ==
Pavlos and Marie-Chantal Miller were first introduced in 1992 on a blind date arranged by Alexander "Alecko" Papamarkou, a New York investment banker billionaire and the son of a former aide to Pavlos's grandfather King Paul of Greece. Prior to this encounter, Papamarkou had told Pavlos of Marie-Chantal, who was the daughter of his client, Robert Warren Miller. Papamarkou introduced the couple at the 40th birthday party for Philip Niarchos in New Orleans, which was given by Philip's father, Greek shipping magnate Stavros Niarchos. According to Marie-Chantal in a 2008 Vanity Fair interview, "It was love at first sight. I knew that [Pavlos] was the person I would marry.” Papamarkou has traditionally been credited with "engineering" their marriage.

== Engagement ==
Dual monogram of the couple

Pavlos proposed marriage to Marie-Chantal on a ski lift in Gstaad, Switzerland, over the Christmas holiday in 1994. Following the proposal, Pavlos formally asked Marie-Chantal's parents for their permission. Pavlos's parents, Constantine II and Anne-Marie of Greece, officially announced the engagement from their residence in London on 11 January 1995. In his announcement, Constantine described himself as "over the moon about this."

The same week as Constantine's announcement, Pavlos and Marie-Chantal traveled to Fener in Istanbul, Turkey, to be blessed by Ecumenical Patriarch Bartholomew I of Constantinople. Prior to their meeting with the Ecumenical Patriarch, Marie-Chantal announced that she would be converting from the Roman Catholic to the Greek Orthodox Church. Marie-Chantal was received into the Greek Orthodox Church on 22 May 1995 at St. Paul's Chapel in New York, with Alecko Papamarkou acting as her Godfather. Both the Greek Royal Family and the Miller family were in attendance.

During their engagement, Pavlos was attending the Edmund A. Walsh School of Foreign Service at Georgetown University in Washington, D.C. where he received a master's degree in international relations and economics in May. While at Georgetown, Pavlos's roommate was his first cousin, Felipe, Prince of Asturias. Marie-Chantal was on leave as an art history major at New York University and attended courses at the Corcoran College of Art and Design to be closer to Pavlos.

== Celebrations and events ==
The week before the wedding, Elizabeth II hosted a tea party reception at Claridge's in Mayfair.

Marie-Chantal's parents, Robert Warren Miller and his wife Chantal, hosted an extravagant pre-wedding champagne reception, dinner, and ball for between 1,200 and 1,300 guests two nights before the wedding at Wrotham Park, a Palladian mansion in Butter Green near Sevenoaks. Two giant marquees were erected on the grounds at Wrotham Park to resemble the Parthenon, which were decorated in blue and white, the national colors of Greece. The tent and marquees were designed by Robert Isabell, a last-minute addition to the wedding planning team when he was invited by Marie-Chantal's mother to save the Parthenon tent after a miscalculation in the amount of fabric. Chantal Miller asked, "Could [Isabell] come right away?" to which Isabell responded, "I’ll take the Concorde and be there tomorrow. Get me a room at Claridge's, and we’ll put this thing together." For the party, Isabell conceived of the marquee steel structure with a floor of hand-stamped cork, a false linen ceiling, and pillars and a cornice that looked as if they were made of marble.

After cocktails were finished, a white curtain behind the pillars was pulled back, and the guests walked through the arch to dinner, where large urns on laurel-wrapped pedestals each contained thousands of yellow and orange Ecuadoran roses. 100,000 flowers were flown in from Ecuador for the event. The lights that illuminated the field behind the tent were so extensive that they had to be cleared with London Heathrow Airport. Much of the scenery was fabricated in the United States and transported to England by an art shipper. Prince Philip, Duke of Edinburgh, drove himself to the reception in a Land Rover. Albert, Hereditary Prince of Monaco, was also in attendance, but was unable to attend the wedding due to the private wedding ceremony for his younger sister, Princess Stéphanie of Monaco, and Daniel Ducruet in Monte Carlo on the same day. The reception continued until 4:00 a.m. when most of the remaining guests enjoyed a champagne breakfast. In 2004, Constantine said that preparing the wedding was "quite difficult", but called it a "very enjoyable day".

Pavlos's aunt, Margrethe II of Denmark, traveled to London aboard Denmark's royal yacht, Dannebrog, which was moored on the River Thames at the Tower of London for the duration of her visit. Margrethe hosted a luncheon for Pavlos and Marie-Chantal aboard the Dannebrog with 100 guests in attendance.

Before the couple's wedding, Marie-Chantal's father provided her with a £200 million dowry.

== Wedding service ==
The heavily publicized Greek Orthodox wedding ceremony, organized by Lady Elizabeth Anson, took place six months after the proposal on 1 July 1995 at St Sophia's Cathedral in Bayswater. The wedding ceremony was conducted in Greek and was led by Gregorios Theocharous, Archbishop of the Greek Orthodox Archdiocese of Thyateira and Great Britain, and officiated by ten prelates. Lasting more than one hour, the wedding ceremony was attended by over 450 guests seated within the cathedral and another 850 guests, including Queen Elizabeth The Queen Mother, seated at Hampton Court Palace where the ceremony was broadcast via satellite.

The personal florist of the Danish Royal Family, Erik Bering, and six assistants decorated St Sophia's Cathedral with 30,000 pink flowers (lilies, peonies, and carnations) hung in garlands.

=== Clothing ===
Marie-Chantal's pearl-encrusted ivory silk wedding dress with a tulip-shaped front and 4.5 meter Chantilly lace train was made by Valentino Garavani and reportedly cost $225,000, as did her mother's and sisters' ensembles. Twenty-five people worked on Marie-Chantal's dress, which took four months and 12 different kinds of lace to complete. Valentino's Roman ateliers made 62 outfits for the wedding, including the dresses for Queen Sofía of Spain, Infanta Cristina of Spain, Rosario, Princess of Preslav, and Empress Farah Pahlavi of Iran. Marie-Chantal also wore a diamond tiara lent to her by Pavlos's mother, Anne-Marie.

Pavlos and his groomsmen wore hand-tailored suits by Brioni of Rome.

== Wedding party ==
=== Bridesmaids and flower girls, best man and page boys ===
Bridesmaids

- Princess Theodora of Greece and Denmark
- The Hon. Alexandra Knatchbull
- Marietta Chandris
- Isabel Getty

Groomsmen

- The Prince of Asturias
- Prince Nikolaos of Greece and Denmark

Pages

- Prince Philippos of Greece and Denmark
- Anthony Chandris
- Sebastian Flick
- Christian Robbs

Crown bearers

- Prince Nikolaos of Greece and Denmark
- The Crown Prince of Denmark
- The Hereditary Prince of Sayn-Wittgenstein-Berleburg
- Prince Guillaume of Luxembourg
- The Prince of Orange
- The Prince of Asturias
- The Prince of Turnovo
- Christopher Getty
- Prince Alexander von Fürstenberg

== Reception ==
Marie-Chantal's parents also hosted an afternoon luncheon reception at Hampton Court Palace, which was also decorated by Robert Isabell. In addition to the wedding service, Lady Elizabeth Anson also organized the catering, just as she did at the wedding of the Prince and Princess of Wales in 1981. Her brother, Patrick Anson, 5th Earl of Lichfield, was the official photographer, as he had been for Charles and Diana. Colette Peters created the eight-tiered wedding cake, which was accompanied by 300 additional cakes, one per table. The cake's design was inspired by a china pattern from the Royal Collection. Valentino Garavani, the designer of Marie-Chantal's wedding dress, remarked "I have never been to such a beautifully arranged wedding--the flowers, the tables, the tent." The cost of the dinner at Wortham Park and the Hampton Court Palace luncheon reception was reportedly $5 million.

== Political controversy in Greece ==
Ten conservative New Democracy members of the Hellenic Parliament accepted invitations and attended the wedding ceremony, which sparked fierce controversy in Athens. Prime Minister of Greece Andreas Papandreou, a member of Greece's Panhellenic Socialist Movement political party, asked for the resignation of each member of Parliament who traveled to the wedding. Papandreou claimed that by attending the wedding, members of Parliament lent "tacit support" for the abolition of the Hellenic Republic and the restoration of the Kingdom of Greece. The wedding ceremony was televised live in Greece and attracted significant audiences on Greece's two leading channels. Opinion polls taken after the wedding revealed a boost in the popularity of the Greek Royal Family.

== Guests ==
=== Groom's family ===
- King Constantine II and Queen Anne-Marie of the Hellenes, the groom's parents
  - Princess Alexia of Greece and Denmark, the groom's sister
  - Prince Nikolaos of Greece and Denmark, the groom's brother
  - Princess Theodora of Greece and Denmark, the groom's sister
  - Prince Philippos of Greece and Denmark, the groom's brother
- The Queen and King of Spain, the groom's paternal aunt and uncle
  - (Spain) The Duchess and Duke of Lugo, the groom's first cousin and her husband
  - Infanta Cristina of Spain, the groom's first cousin
  - (Spain) The Prince of Asturias, the groom's first cousin
- Princess Irene of Greece and Denmark, the groom's paternal aunt
- Lady Katherine Brandram, the groom's paternal grandaunt
  - Paul Brandram, the groom's first cousin once removed
- Prince Michael of Greece and Denmark and Marina Karella, the groom's first cousin, twice removed and his wife
  - Princess Alexandra of Greece, the groom's second cousin once removed
  - Princess Olga of Greece, the groom's second cousin once removed
- Queen Ingrid of Denmark, the groom's maternal grandmother
  - The Queen of Denmark, the groom's maternal aunt
    - The Crown Prince of Denmark, the groom's first cousin
    - Prince Joachim of Denmark and Miss Alexandra Manley, the groom's first cousin and his fiancée
  - (Denmark) The Princess of Sayn-Wittgenstein-Berleburg, the groom's maternal aunt
    - (Denmark) The Hereditary Prince of Sayn-Wittgenstein-Berleburg, the groom's first cousin
    - (Denmark) Princess Alexandra of Sayn-Wittgenstein-Berleburg, the groom's first cousin
    - (Denmark) Princess Nathalie of Sayn-Wittgenstein-Berleburg, the groom's first cousin

=== Bride's family ===
- Mr and Mrs Robert Warren Miller, the bride's parents
  - Mr and Mrs Christopher Getty, the bride's sister and brother-in-law
    - Miss Isabel Getty, the bride's niece
  - Miss Alexandra Miller and Prince Alexander von Fürstenberg, the bride's sister and her fiancé

=== Foreign royalty ===
==== Reigning royalty ====
- Prince Laurent of Belgium, the groom's third cousin
- The King and Queen of Jordan
- The Crown Prince and Crown Princess of Jordan
- Princess Firyal of Jordan
  - Prince Talal and Princess Ghida of Jordan
- The Prince of Liechtenstein
- The Grand Duke and Grand Duchess of Luxembourg, the groom's fourth cousin once removed and the groom's second cousin once removed
  - The Hereditary Grand Duke and Hereditary Grand Duchess of Luxembourg, the groom's third cousin and his wife
  - Prince Guillaume and Princess Sibilla of Luxembourg, the groom's third cousin and the groom's fourth cousin
- The Hereditary Prince of Monaco
- (Netherlands) The Prince of Orange, the groom's fifth cousin once removed
- Prince Friso of the Netherlands, the groom's fifth cousin once removed
- (Spain) The Duchess and Duke of Soria, the groom's third cousin once removedand her husband
  - (Spain) Don Alfonso Zurita y Borbón, the groom's fourth cousin
  - (Spain) Doña María Zurita y Borbón, the groom's fourth cousin
- (Spain) The Duchess of Badajoz, the groom's third cousin once removed
  - (Spain) Doña Simoneta Gómez-Acebo y Borbón, the groom's fourth cousin
  - (Spain) The Viscount of La Torre, the groom's fourth cousin
  - (Spain) Don Bruno Gómez-Acebo y Borbón, the groom's fourth cousin
  - (Spain) Don Luis Gómez-Acebo y Borbón, the groom's fourth cousin
  - (Spain) Don Fernando Gómez-Acebo y Borbón, the groom's fourth cousin
- The King and Queen of Sweden, the groom's first cousin once removed, and his wife
  - The Crown Princess of Sweden, the groom's second cousin
- (Sweden) Princess Désirée, Baroness Silfverschiöld and Baron Niclas Silfverschiöld, the groom's first cousin once removed, and her husband
- Queen Elizabeth The Queen Mother, widow of the groom's second cousin twice removed
  - The Queen of the United Kingdom and the Duke of Edinburgh, the groom's third cousin once removed, and the groom's first cousin twice removed
    - (United Kingdom) The Prince of Wales, the groom's second cousin once removed
- (United Kingdom) The Duke and Duchess of Gloucester, the groom's third cousin once removed, and his wife
- (United Kingdom) The Duke and Duchess of Kent, the groom's second cousin once removed, and his wife
- (United Kingdom) Princess Alexandra, The Hon. Lady Ogilvy and The Hon. Sir Angus Ogilvy, the groom's second cousin once removed, and her husband
- (United Kingdom) Prince and Princess Michael of Kent, the groom's second cousin once removed, and his wife

==== Non-reigning royalty ====
- King Michael I and Queen Anne of Romania, the groom's first cousin once removed, and the groom's second cousin twice removed
  - Crown Princess Margareta of Romania, the groom's second cousin
- Tsar Simeon II and Tsarista Margarita of Bulgaria, the groom's fourth cousin twice removed, and his wife
  - The Prince of Turnovo, the groom's fifth cousin once removed
  - The Prince and Princess of Preslav, the groom's fifth cousin once removed, and his wife
  - The Prince and Princess of Panagyurishte, the groom's fifth cousin once removed, and his wife
  - The Prince and Princess of Vidin, the groom's fifth cousin once removed, and his wife
  - Princess Kalina of Bulgaria, the groom's fifth cousin once removed
- Crown Prince Alexander and Crown Princess Katherine of Yugoslavia, the groom's second cousin and his wife
- Prince and Princess Alexander of Yugoslavia, the groom's second cousin once removed, and his wife
  - Prince Dimitri of Yugoslavia, the groom's third cousin
  - Prince Serge of Yugoslavia and Miss Vanessa von Zitzewitz, the groom's third cousin and his guest
- The Prince and Princess of Naples, the groom's fourth cousin twice removed, and his wife
  - The Prince of Venice, the groom's fifth cousin once removed
- Princess Maria Gabriella, Mrs Zellinger de Balkany, the groom's fourth cousin twice removed
- The Duke and Duchess of Aosta, the groom's first cousin once removed, and his wife
- The Duke and Duchess of Calabria, the groom's fifth cousin once removed, and her husband
- The Duke and Duchess of Braganza the groom's fifth cousin once removed, and his wife
- The Prince and Princess of Hanover the groom's first cousin once removed, and his wife
- Prince and Princess George William of Hanover the groom's paternal granduncle and his wife, the groom's first cousin twice removed
- The Margrave and Margravine of Baden the groom's second cousin once removed, and his wife
- The Landgrave of Hesse, the groom's second cousin once removed
- Prince Karl and Princess Yvonne of Hesse, the groom's second cousin once removed, and his wife
- Archduchess Helen of Austria, the groom's second cousin once removed
- Princess Tatiana, Mrs Fruchaud and Henri Fruchaud, the groom's second cousin once removed and her husband
- The Aga Khan IV
- Empress Farah of Iran
  - Crown Prince Reza and Crown Princess Yasmine of Iran
  - Princess Farahnaz of Iran
  - Prince Ali-Reza of Iran
  - Princess Leila of Iran
- Prince and Princess Egon von Fürstenberg, father and stepmother of the bride's future brother-in-law
  - Princess Tatiana von Fürstenberg, sister of the bride's future brother-in-law
- Princess Virginia von Fürstenberg, aunt of the bride's future brother-in-law

=== Nobility ===
- The Lord Carrington
- The Duke and Duchess of Marlborough
- Lord and Lady Romsey, the groom's fourth cousin and his wife
  - The Hon. Alexandra Knatchbull, the groom's fourth cousin, once removed
- The Earl of Lichfield (stepson of the groom's second cousin once removed)
- Lady Elizabeth Shakerley (stepdaughter of the groom's second cousin once removed)
- The Marqués and Marquesa of Samaranch
- Donna Marella Agnelli
- Princess Donatella Flick, the bride's godmother

=== Other notable guests ===
- Sophie and George Coumantaros
- Astrid and Christopher Forbes
  - Charlotte Forbes
  - Catherine Forbes
- Valentino Garavani
- Ann and Gordon Getty
- Marietta and Alex Goulandris
- Karen and Peter John Goulandris
- Veronica and Randolph Apperson Hearst
- Nan Kempner
- John Kluge
- Lita Livanos
- Elle Macpherson
- Manuel Basil "Bluey" Mavroleon
- Nancy Kovack and Zubin Mehta
- Rupert Murdoch
- Senator Claiborne Pell
- Marcela and Javier Pérez de Cuéllar
- Carroll Petrie
- Alexandra and Panagiotis Theodoracopulos
- Diane von Fürstenberg and Barry Diller, mother of the bride's future brother-in-law and her guest
- Cecile and Ezra Zilka

The couple's matchmaker, Alecko Papamarkou, was not in attendance reportedly due to a falling-out with King Constantine after he asked for a commission for his services. However, according to W, Papamarkou was away recuperating from a recent surgery and also due to his mother's illness.

== Honeymoon ==
The couple's honeymoon destination was a closely guarded secret leading up to the wedding day. Not even Marie-Chantal knew of their honeymoon details.

== Style and title ==
In Denmark by right, and elsewhere by courtesy, Marie-Chantal's style and title since her marriage to Crown Prince Pavlos is Her Royal Highness The Crown Princess Pavlos of Greece, Princess of Denmark.
