= American royalty =

American royalty may refer to American citizens who are members of royal families, through birth, naturalization or marriage; or American dynastic families that are given the epithet or moniker as American royalty.

== Former monarchies of the United States ==
The territory of the United States of America was once ruled by monarchies, as such, the royalty of these territories included:

=== Indigenous royals ===
- Hawaiian monarchy, for Hawaii, conquered by the US and annexed into the Republic
- Paramount Chiefs of the Powhatan Confederacy

=== Colonial monarchies of the territory now the United States ===
- British monarchy, for the 13 Colonies, prior to the American Revolution, the Great Lakes Region, the Southeastern States, and the Pacific Northwest
- Dutch monarchy, for the Colony of New Netherlands (New York State / New Jersey / Connecticut / Vermont)
- Swedish monarchy, for the Swedish Delaware Chesapeake Colony
- Spanish monarchy, for Florida, California, Louisiana, Desert Southwest, Texas, Puerto Rico, Guam, Virgin Islands
- French monarchy, for Louisiana, the Great Plains, and Midwest
- Danish monarchy, for Virgin Islands
- Russian monarchy, for Alaska
- Japanese monarchy, for Guam and Northern Mariana Islands
- German monarchy, for Northern Mariana Islands

== Royalty of foreign nations ==
Americans may remain American and hold titles of nobility. However no American governments can bestow titles of nobility, and no one holding such title can hold a government job.

=== Monarchs born in the United States ===
Only two people born in the United States have become head of state in a monarchy.

- Bhumibol Adulyadej (1927–2016), born in Cambridge, Massachusetts, became King of Thailand and the first monarch born in the United States.
- Pope Leo XIV (b. 1955), born Robert Francis Prevost in Chicago, Illinois, was elected the 267th pope of the Catholic Church and sovereign of Vatican City, becoming the first monarch to also hold US citizenship.

=== Americans who married into royalty ===
- Elizabeth Patterson Bonaparte (1785–1879), morganatic consort of Jérôme Bonaparte
- Susan May Williams (1812–1881), Princess Jérôme Napoléon Bonaparte; wife of Jérôme Napoléon Bonaparte of the House of Bonaparte
- Antoinette Van Leer Polk (1847- 1919), Baroness de Charette; who married General Athanase-Charles-Marie Charette de la Contrie of House of Bourbon
- Jane Allen Campbell (1865–1938), Princess-consort of San Faustino; wife of Carlo Bourbon del Monte, Prince di San Faustino
- Nonie May Stewart (1878–1923), Princess Anastasia of Greece and Denmark; wife of Prince Christopher of Greece and Denmark, a member of the Greek royal family
- Mary Elsie Moore (1889–1941), Princess-consort of Civitella-Cesi; wife of Marino Torlonia, 4th Prince of Civitella-Cesi
- Wallis Simpson (1896–1986) Duchess of Windsor; who married and triggered the abdication of King Edward VIII of the United Kingdom
- Kay Sage (1898–1963) ex-Princess-consort of San Faustino; wife of Ranieri Bourbon del Monte, Prince di San Faustino
- Barbara Hutton (1912–1979), ex-Princess-consort of Prince Igor Troubetzkoy of the Trubetskoy family, ex-Princess-consort of Prince Pierre Raymond Doan Vinh na Champassak of the Kingdom of Champasak
- Anne Bowes-Lyon (1917–1980), Princess Georg of Denmark, wife of Prince Georg of Denmark
- Rita Hayworth (1918–1987) ex-Princess-consort of Prince Aly Khan of Nizari Ismaili Aga Khan
- Grace Kelly (1929–1982), Princess-consort of Monaco; married Prince Rainer III of Monaco, head of the Monégasque royal family
- Lee Radziwill (1933–2019) ex-Princess-consort of Prince Stanisław Albrecht Radziwill of the Reichfurst House of Radziwill of the Holy Roman Empire; she was the sister of former First Lady of the United States Jacqueline Kennedy Onassis, née Bouvier
- Hope Cooke (born 1940) ex-Queen-consort of Sikkim
- Queen Noor Lisa Halaby (born 1951) Queen-consort of King Hussein of Jordan; now Dowager Queen of Jordan
- Princess Angela of Liechtenstein (born 1958), Princess-consort of Prince Maximilian of Liechtenstein of the House of Liechtenstein
- Marie-Chantal, Crown Princess of Greece (born 1968), Princess-consort of Crown Prince Pavlos of Greece; she is the sister of Princess Alexandra von Fürstenberg
- Alexandra von Fürstenberg (born 1972), ex-Princess-consort of Prince Alexander von Fürstenberg of the House of Fürstenberg of the Principality of Fürstenberg-Fürstenberg; she is the sister of Crown Princess Marie-Chantal
- Ali Kay, Princess-consort of Prince Alexander von Fürstenberg of the House of Fürstenberg of the Principality of Fürstenberg-Fürstenbergf
- Carole Radziwill (born 1966), Princess Carole Ann Radziwill; married Prince Anthony Radziwill, the nephew of former First Lady Jacqueline Kennedy
- Princess Sarah Zeid (born 1972), Princess-consort of Prince Zeid bin Ra'ad, Crown Prince of Iraq
- Christopher O'Neill (born 1974) Prince-consort of Princess Madeleine, Duchess of Hälsingland and Gästrikland
- Kelly Rondestvedt (born 1975) Princess-consort of Hubertus, Hereditary Prince of Saxe-Coburg and Gotha, heir of the Duchy of Saxony
- Princess Keisha Omilana (born 1986), wife of Prince Adekunle Adebayo Omilana of Ipetu-Ijesha in Nigeria.
- Meghan, Duchess of Sussex (born 1981), wife of Prince Harry, Duke of Sussex; who married into the House of Windsor (Note: Though many people assume Meghan Markle is Canadian, she is an American born and raised in the United States.)
- LeOntra Breeden (born 1982), Archduchess of Austria, Consort to Archduke Franz Ferdinand von Habsburg-Lothringen
- Kendra Spears (born 1988) Princess Salwa Aga Khan consort of Prince Rahim Aga Khan of Nizari Ismaili Aga Khan
- Alana Camille Bunte (born 1990), Princess-consort of Prince Casimir zu Sayn-Wittgenstein-Sayn of Sayn-Wittgenstein-Sayn
- Ariana Austin Princess-consort of Prince Yoel of Ethiopia Joel Makonnen of the Solomonic Dynasty
- Deena Aljuhani Abdulaziz (born 1975) married Saudi Prince Sultan bin Fahad bin Nasser bin Abdulaziz

=== Royalty who were born in America ===
- Prince Jerome Napoleon Bonaparte II (1830–1893), born in Baltimore, Maryland, USA: member of the House of Bonaparte
- Prince Charles Joseph Bonaparte (1851–1921), born in Baltimore, Maryland, USA; member of the House of Bonaparte
- Catherine Oxenberg (born 1961) born in New York City, New York, USA; daughter of Princess Elizabeth of Yugoslavia
- Christina Oxenberg (born 1962) born in New York City, New York, USA; daughter of Princess Elizabeth of Yugoslavia
- Prince Alexander von Fürstenberg (born 1970) born in Malibu, California, USA; member of the German princely family of Fürstenberg.
- Princess Tatiana von Fürstenberg (born 1971) born in New York, New York, USA; member of the German princely family of Fürstenberg.
- Princess Sarah Culberson (born 1976) born in Morgantown, West Virginia, US; member of the ruling family of Bumpe in Sierra Leone.
- Peter, Hereditary Prince of Yugoslavia (born 1980) born in Chicago, Illinois, USA; member of the House of Karađorđević.
- Prince Alexander of Yugoslavia (born 1982) born in Fairfax, Virginia, USA; member of the House of Karađorđević.
- Prince Philip of Yugoslavia (born 1982) born in Fairfax, Virginia, USA; member of the House of Karađorđević.
- Princess Tatiana Galitzine (born 1984), member of the Russian princely House of Golitsyn and daughter of Archduchess Maria-Anna of Austria
- Princess Nora zu Oettingen-Spielberg (born 1990) born in West Palm Beach, Florida, US; daughter of the current Prince of Oettingen-Spielberg and wife of Lord Max Percy
- India Oxenberg (born 1991) born in Malibu, California, USA; granddaughter of Princess Elizabeth of Yugoslavia
- Jazmin Grace Grimaldi (born 1992) born in Palm Springs, California, USA; illegitimate daughter of Albert II, Prince of Monaco and member of the House of Grimaldi.
- Princess Noor Pahlavi (born 1992) born in Washington D.C., USA; granddaughter of the last Shah and Empress of Iran
- Princess Charlotte of Nassau (born 1995) born in Boston, Massachusetts; daughter of Prince Robert of Luxembourg and a great-granddaughter of Charlotte, Grand Duchess of Luxembourg, and a member of the Grand Ducal Family of Luxembourg.
- Princess Maria-Olympia of Greece and Denmark (born 1996); born in New York, New York, USA; member of the non-reigning Greek royal family and the House of Glücksburg.
- Faiq bin Prince Jefri Bolkiah (born 1998); born in Los Angeles, California, USA; member of the Brunei royal family
- Prince Constantine Alexios of Greece and Denmark (born 1998); born in New York, New York, USA; member of the non-reigning Greek royal family and the House of Glücksburg.
- Princess Talita von Fürstenberg (born 1999), member of the German princely family of Fürstenberg.
- Prince Achileas-Andreas of Greece and Denmark (born 2000) born in New York, New York, USA; member of the non-reigning Greek royal family and the House of Glücksburg.
- Princess Eugénie of Bourbon (born 2007) born in Miami, Florida; member of the House of Bourbon
- Maud Elizabeth Daphne Marina Windsor (born 2013) born in Los Angeles, California, USA; granddaughter of Prince Michael of Kent and member of the House of Windsor
- Princess Leonore, Duchess of Gotland (born 2014) born in New York, New York, USA; granddaughter of King Carl XVI Gustaf of Sweden and member of the House of Bernadotte
- Princess Lilibet of Sussex (born 2021) known as Lilibet Mountbatten-Windsor until the accession of her grandfather to the British throne, born in Santa Barbara, California, USA; daughter of Prince Harry, Duke of Sussex and Meghan, Duchess of Sussex

=== Royalty who became naturalized Americans ===
- Prince Jérôme Napoléon Bonaparte (1805–1870), member of the House of Bonaparte
- Prince Arnold zu Windisch-Graetz (1929–2007), member of the House of Windisch-Graetz
- Diane von Fürstenberg (born 1946) ex-Princess-consort of Prince Egon von Fürstenberg of the House of Fürstenberg of the Principality of Fürstenberg-Fürstenberg (Note: Diane von Fürstenberg became an American after she had already divorced Egon von Fürstenberg.)
- Prince Augustine Kposowa, member of the ruling family of Bumpe in Sierra Leone

=== Royalty who were born abroad with dual American citizenship ===
- Marina Torlonia di Civitella-Cesi (1916–1960), daughter of Marino Torlonia, 4th Prince of Civitella-Cesi
- Prince Archie of Sussex (born 2019) known as Archie Mountbatten-Windsor until the accession of his grandfather to the British throne, born in London, UK; son of Prince Harry, Duke of Sussex and Meghan, Duchess of Sussex

== Politics and popular culture ==
=== Political dynasties ===
- Adams political family, of two Presidents, two signers of the Declaration of Independence
- Bush family, of two Presidents, two Governors, and senators
- Trump family, of one president, one assistant to the president, and one chair of the Republican National Convention
- Clinton family, of one President and one Secretary of State
- Harrison family of Virginia, of three Presidents, a signer of the Declaration of Independence, and governors
- Kennedy family, who created the Camelot era mid-century
- Lee family, political family of Colonial Virginia and Maryland
- Roosevelt family, from the old stock Knickerbocker settlers
- Washington family, family of George Washington, commanding general of the Continental Army, first president of the United States, the man who would not be king
- Family of Robert Carter I, "King Carter", wealthy planting family of Colonial Virginia

=== Business dynasties ===
- Astor family
- Carnegie family
- Crown Family
- Du Pont family
- Getty family
- Hearst family
- Hilton family
- Kardashian family
- Lowell family
- Morgan family
- Pritzker family
- Rockefeller family
- Vanderbilt family
- Walton family

=== Celebrities ===
- Frank Sinatra (1915–1998), the chairman of the Board
- Ella Fitzgerald (1917–1996), the First Lady of Song
- Elvis Presley (1935–1977), the King (of Rock and Roll)
- Tina Turner (1939–2023), The Queen of Rock
- Aretha Franklin (1942–2018), the Queen of Soul
- Dolly Parton (1946−2026), the Queen of Country
- Michael Jackson (1958–2009), the King (of Pop)
- Beyonce Knowles-Carter, Queen Bey
- Madonna, the Queen of Pop
- Britney Spears, the Princess of Pop
- Justin Timberlake, the Prince of Pop

=== Documentaries ===
- American Royalty Docuseries: The Miss America Pageant Its Legacy and Its Future (2023, 5 episodes)

== See also ==
- List of Americans who married foreign royalty and nobility
- United Empire Loyalist (American royalists) those 13 Colonies Colonials who disagreed with the Declaration of Independence
- Loyalist (American Revolution), those 13 Colonies Colonials who sided with the King during the American Revolutionary War
- Canadian royalty
