= Robert Isabell =

American businessman (1952–2009)

Bruce Robert Isabell (June 2, 1952 – July 8, 2009) was an American event planner known for his creation of lavish and innovative events for celebrity clients. He helped make Christmas at the White House during the presidency of Bill Clinton, and contributed to the growth of Studio 54 in Manhattan in the late 1970s and early 1980s.

== Early life ==
Isabell was born in Duluth, Minnesota, where he worked in a flower shop as a youth. After graduating from high school he moved to Minneapolis.

He moved to New York City in the 1970s and was hired by Ian Schrager at Studio 54, after Schrager had seen the creative designs Isabell had developed while he was working for event planner Renny Reynolds who had done work at the club and was the leading planner in his day. Schrager described how Isabell "never tried to do too much, it was never design on steroids, yet there was always the razzle-dazzle".

== Career ==
Isabell started on his own operating a floral shop within the Bergdorf Goodman Building in Midtown Manhattan. He established "a full-service event-production house" in the city's West Village where he would oversee the creation of events around the world, in which the entire setting including flowers, lighting, sound and table decorations would be part of his craft. Anna Wintour of Vogue magazine described him as "the king of the event world" who was "a magician" and the first person that top hostesses would approach to create spectacular events. Isabell created roughly 30 events for writer and editor Tina Brown. She regarded him as "sort of a genius" who had the ability to "take any space and make magic in it". For over a decade, he designed the annual Met Ball for Vogue.

In the late 1970s, he had four tons of glitter dumped on the floor of Studio 54 for a New Year's Eve event, with club co-owner Ian Schrager describing how guests felt "like you were standing on stardust". Bracketed between the 1986 wedding of Edwin Schlossberg to Caroline Kennedy and the 1996 nuptials of John F. Kennedy Jr. and Carolyn Bessette, he worked on the 1994 funeral of Jacqueline Kennedy Onassis. For the July 1995 wedding of billionaire Robert Warren Miller's daughter Marie-Chantal to Pavlos, Crown Prince of Greece at Saint Sophia in Bayswater, London, Isabell created a virtual Greek temple in a tent, including pillars topped with roses, with a budget variously estimated at $5–8 million. For the wedding of Alexandra von Fürstenberg, Marie-Chantal's sister, to Prince Alexandre Egon von Fürstenberg, son of Diane von Fürstenberg, Isabell transformed a tent in Battery Park into a Chinese teahouse complete with a throne room that included hanging lanterns and bamboo trees. For Christmas 1998 at the Clinton White House, Isabell created a massive fir wreath with 1,500 lights individually colored a shade he called "Presidential blue".

His last project was an Independence Day event he co-prepared for Lally Weymouth in Southampton, New York. Ian Schrager stated that Isabell had headed home from The Hamptons on the night of July 4 and had not been heard from before his death.

== Death ==
Isabell was found dead on July 8, 2009, aged 57, in his Greenwich Village townhouse, where he had suffered a fatal myocardial infarction (heart attack). He is survived by his mother, two brothers and a sister.
