= Talita von Fürstenberg =

American socialite, designer, model, and German princess

- Born: Talita Prinzessin zu Fürstenberg; May 7, 1999 (age 27)
- House: Fürstenberg
- Father: Prince Alexander von Fürstenberg
- Mother: Alexandra Miller
- Occupation: Fashion designer, model, socialite

Princess Talita Natasha von Fürstenberg (born May 7, 1999), known professionally as Talita von Furstenberg, is an American socialite, fashion designer and model. She is the granddaughter of fashion designers Diane von Fürstenberg and Prince Egon von Fürstenberg and by birth a member of the House of Fürstenberg, an ancient Swabian noble family. In 2019, she launched her fashion line, TVF for DVF, in partnership with her grandmother's fashion house.

== Early life, family, and education ==
von Fürstenberg was born on May 7, 1999, to socialites Princess Alexandra and Prince Alexander von Fürstenberg. On her father's side, she is a member of the German Princely Family of Fürstenberg and heiress of the Italian Agnelli family (her great-great grandparents were Edoardo Agnelli and Virginia Bourbon del Monte). Her paternal grandparents are fashion designers Diane von Fürstenberg and Prince Egon von Fürstenberg. Her maternal grandfather is billionaire businessman Robert Warren Miller. She has a younger brother, Prince Tassilo Egon Maximilian von Fürstenberg, and two younger half brothers, Prince Leon (b. 2012) and Prince Vito zu Fürstenberg (b. 2020). She is the niece of Pia Getty, Marie-Chantal, Crown Princess of Greece, Princess of Denmark, and Princess Tatiana von Fürstenberg. Her parents divorced in 2002. Her mother later married Dax Miller and her father married Ali Kay.

She graduated in 2017 from the Brentwood School in Los Angeles, where she was a member of the fencing team. After graduating from high school, she attended Georgetown University with her cousin, Prince Constantine Alexios of Greece and Denmark, studying international relations. She later transferred to New York University, where she graduated after studying fashion business and marketing.

== Career ==
Von Fürstenberg has interned for Teen Vogue, as well as having been active in her grandmother's fashion house, DvF. In 2015 she was featured on the cover of the October issue and had her own spread for Tatler Magazine. She has also been featured in Teen Vogue. In 2016, von Fürstenberg worked as an intern for Hillary Clinton's presidential campaign.

In April 2016, von Fürstenberg was featured in Vanity Fair alongside two of her first cousins, Isabel Getty and Princess Maria-Olympia of Greece and Denmark.

In 2017, she walked the runway for Dolce & Gabbana during Milan Fashion Week. In 2018, she was named the new muse for DvF.

On April 24, 2019, von Fürstenberg launched her own line for DVF called TVF. The collection consists of 23 items and is targeted toward young people.

== Personal life ==
In July 2025, von Fürstenberg announced her engagement to her longtime partner, Rocco Brignone de Brabant.
