= Ali Kay =

American model

Alison von Fürstenberg
- Born: Alison Parker Kay; Miami, Florida; United States
- Occupation(s): Fashion designer, model
- Spouse: Prince Alexander von Fürstenberg (m. 2020)
- Children: Leon von Fürstenberg; Vito von Fürstenberg

Alison von Fürstenberg (née Alison Parker Kay) is an American model and fashion designer. She is the second wife of Prince Alexander von Fürstenberg.

== Biography ==
Kay graduated from Columbia University in 2006. In 2009 she modeled for a line of DVF sunglasses and was one of the faces of the brand's 2010 Fall/Winter campaign.

In 2009 she became engaged to Prince Alexander von Fürstenberg, the son of fashion designers Prince Egon von Fürstenberg and Diane von Fürstenberg.

In September 2010 Kay debuted her loungewear line, Keep Me at New York Fashion Week.

In December 2010 she was involved in a sexting scandal with basketball player Reggie Miller, whom she met at a market earlier that year. The affair received national media attention.

In July 2012 she gave birth to a son, Leon von Fürstenberg. She is the stepmother of Talita von Fürstenberg. In June 2020, Kay gave birth to her second son, Vito von Fürstenberg. On September 19, 2020, Kay's 36th birthday, she and von Furstenberg married.
