= Barry Diller =

American businessman and media executive (born 1942)

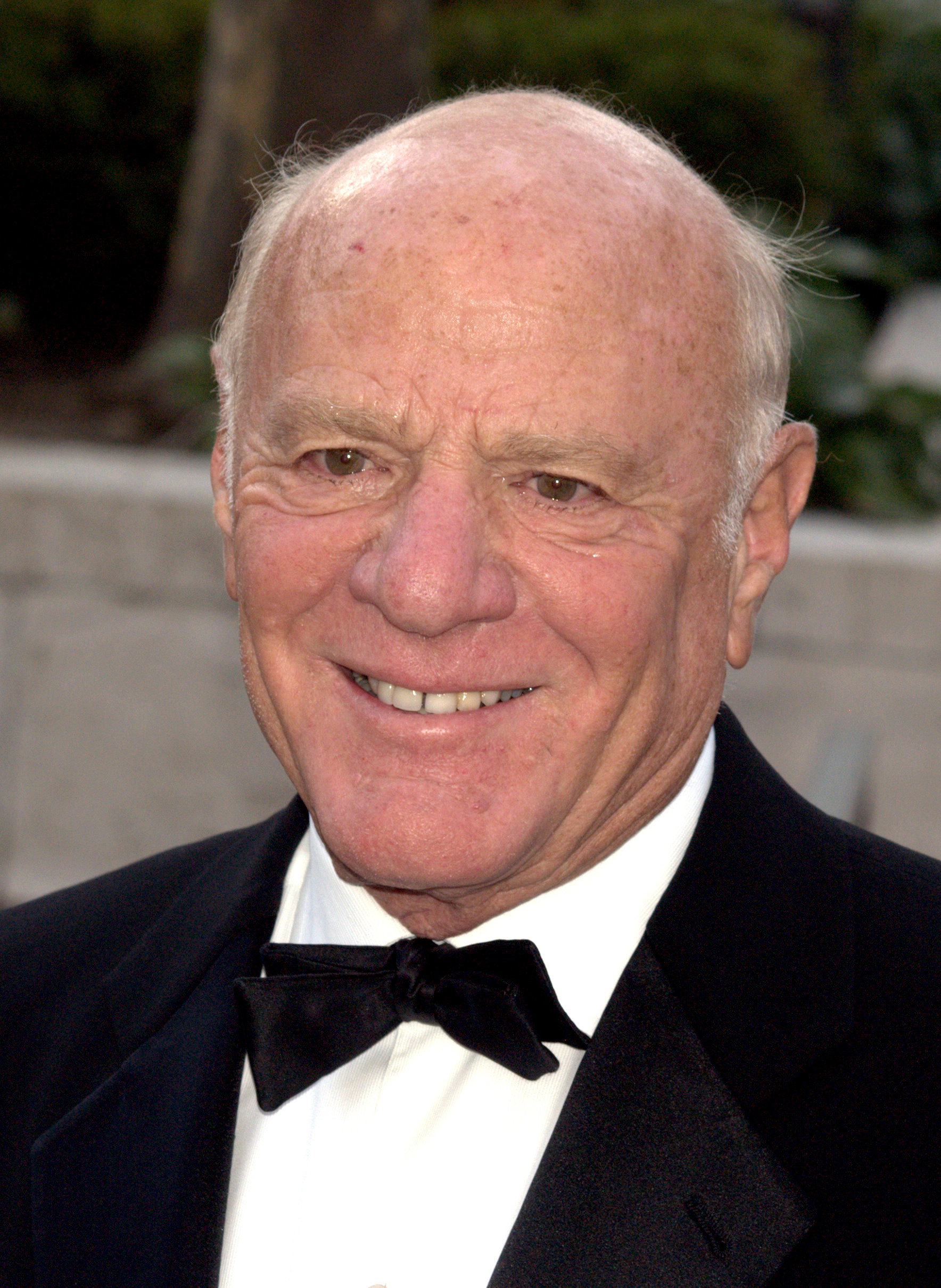
- Diller in 2009
- Born: Barry Charles Diller; February 2, 1942 (age 84); San Francisco, California, U.S.
- Education: University of California, Los Angeles (no degree)
- Occupation: Media executive
- Years active: 1964–present
- Political party: Democratic
- Board member of: Chairman and Senior Executive, People Incorporated (2010–present); Chairman and CEO, IAC (1995–2010); Chairman and Senior Executive, Expedia Group (2005–present); Director, MGM Resorts International (2020–2024); Director, The Coca-Cola Company (2002–present); Director, Tripadvisor (2012–2013); Chairman and Senior Executive, Tripadvisor (2011–2012); Director, Live Nation Entertainment (2010–2011); Chairman, Live Nation Entertainment (2010–2010); Chairman and CEO, 20th Century Fox (1984–1992); Chairman and CEO, Paramount Pictures (1974–1984); Vice President of ABC, Prime-Time Programming (1973–1974)
- Spouse: Diane von Fürstenberg (m. 2001)

Barry Charles Diller (born February 2, 1942) is an American billionaire businessman. He is chairman of People Incorporated and Expedia Group, and founded the Fox Broadcasting Company with Rupert Murdoch and USA Broadcasting. Diller was inducted into the Television Hall of Fame in 1994.

== Early life ==
Diller was born on February 2, 1942, in San Francisco, California, to Michael Diller and his wife Reva (née Addison). He was raised in Beverly Hills. In May 2012, New York magazine described Diller as a "second generation Austrian Jewish kid". On the April 14, 2026 episode of Finding Your Roots it was revealed that Diller's paternal ancestors came from the village of Pianovychi, near Staryi Sambir in the Lviv Oblast of modern-day Ukraine (which was part of the Austria-Hungary-controlled region of Galicia until 1918), and his maternal ancestors came from the Vilna Governorate of the Russian Empire (modern-day Vilnius, Lithuania).

== Career ==
Diller began his career through a family connection in the mailroom of the William Morris Agency after dropping out of UCLA after three weeks. His proximity to the company's file room meant that he could spend free time reading through the archives and learning the entire history of the entertainment industry. He was hired as an assistant by Leonard Goldberg, then West Coast head of ABC, who was promoted to network President at the same time Diller went to work for him in 1964, taking him on to New York City. Diller was soon placed in charge of negotiating broadcast rights to feature films. He was promoted to Vice President of Development in 1965. In this position, Diller created the ABC Movie of the Week, pioneering the concept of the made-for-television movie through a regular series of 90-minute films produced exclusively for television. In 1973, Diller became vice president of ABC's prime time programming.

=== Paramount ===
From 1974 to 1984, Diller was chairman and chief executive officer of Paramount Pictures. With Diller at the helm, the studio produced TV shows such as Laverne & Shirley (1976), Taxi (1978), and Cheers (1982) and films including Saturday Night Fever (1977), Grease (1978), Ordinary People (1980), Raiders of the Lost Ark (1981) and sequel Indiana Jones and the Temple of Doom (1984), Reds (1981), Terms of Endearment (1983), and Beverly Hills Cop (1984).

In 2026, Diller credited the "bonanza" close-together releases of Looking for Mr. Goodbar (1977), Saturday Night Fever and Grease as turning the tide for Paramount during his time as head of the company, describing much of the preceding films released at Paramount during his reign as "one dog movie after the other."

Diller emphasized having separate business units aiding each other. He prevented Paramount parent Gulf+Western-owned Madison Square Garden from selling its interest in the USA Network, so Garden could provide programming for Paramount television networks. In 1983 Diller became head of Gulf+Western's leisure group, including Paramount, Madison Square Garden, Famous Music, and Simon & Schuster. Robert Montgomery of Paul, Weiss described him as "probably the most successful executive in the film business today", and A. D. Murphy, director of the motion picture producing program at the University of Southern California, said "Under Barry Diller, Paramount has become one of the world's greatest entertainment companies".

=== Fox ===
Unable to achieve his goal of competing with the Big Three television networks at Paramount, Diller left the studio. From October 1984 to April 1992, he held the positions of chairman and chief executive officer of 20th Century Fox, where he created and launched the Fox network and greenlighted shows such as Married... with Children and The Simpsons.

=== QVC ===
On February 24, 1992, Diller announced that he would leave Fox within a three-month period, citing a desire to "own my own store". After leaving Fox, Diller's company Arrow Investments Inc. purchased a $25 million stake in the QVC teleshopping network. Despite owning less than 3 percent of the network, Diller gained supervision of the network after forming a partnership with Liberty Media Corporation and the Comcast Corporation which made all of their shares a single group on matters which required shareholder approval. New York Times journalist Calvin Sims noted on December 11, 1992, that Diller sought "to turn the shopping channel into an on-line entertainment and merchandising service in which the subscriber and the cable company can freely interact". He then launched a bid to purchase Paramount Communications, but lost it to Viacom. Diller resigned from QVC in 1995.

=== HSN and USA Broadcasting ===
In August 1995, Diller acquired the assets of Silver King Broadcasting. His ownership of Silver Broadcasting was finalized in March 1996. In August 1996, it was agreed that Silver King Broadcasting, now under Diller's leadership, would buy back the Home Shopping Network (HSN), a former Silver King asset which split from the company in 1992, and that the two companies would merge. In December 1996, Silver King Broadcasting acquired an 80% stake in HSN for $1.3 billion worth of stock, and afterwards changed its own name to HSN, Inc. Through his purchase of HSN, Diller would also eventually acquire Universal's cable and domestic-television assets from the Bronfman family.

Due to Home Shopping getting more notoriety on the cable networks from his former dealings with the QVC Network, Diller sought to repurpose the broadcast stations into independent, locally run stations as part of a station group dubbed USA Broadcasting of which the flagship station was WAMI-TV in Miami Beach, Florida. In October 1997, it was announced that Diller would be acquiring the USA Network, which was run by Kay Koplovitz, and other Seagram-owned Universal TV businesses, which included the Koplovitz-run USA Network spinoff Sci Fi Channel, for $4.1 billion and that these networks would be owned by Diller's Home Shopping Network. Diller previously had owned stock in the USA Network in the early 1980s, when Paramount Pictures acquired part of the network under his leadership. Paramount parent company Gulf + Western also owned the Madison Square Garden Sports Corp., which helped create the USA Network with Koplovitz. He was also the one who put together the 1981 USA Network ownership agreement between Paramount, Time Inc. and MCA which convinced Madison Square Garden management to not sell their interests in the network.

Diller's purchase of the USA Network was finalized in February 1998. In April 1998, Diller assumed the chairman and CEO positions which Koplovitz previously held at USA Networks since 1977. During Diller's time as head of the USA Network, the network's flagship WWF programming experienced a dramatic ratings turnaround, with WWF Raw dominating the ratings on cable television. Under Diller's leadership, the USA Network also showed tolerance to the growing WWF angles which were breaking with traditional censorship and were considered controversial, with even his USA Network spokesman David Schwartz describing an incident where the wrestler Jacqueline exposed one of her breasts as "not worse than anything you see on broadcast television at that time of night, such as NYPD Blue". Shaun Assel and Mike Mooneyham's book Sex, Lies, and Headlocks: The Real Story of Vince McMahon and World Wrestling Entertainment stated that "the terrain shifted completely under everyone's feet" following Diller's purchase of the USA Network and also resulted in him and Universal TV executive Bonnie Hammer, who was regarded as the most sympathetic USA Network executive when came to relations with the WWF, thwarting an attempt which Koplovitz and other USA Network executives, including network entertainment head Rod Perth, made to remove the WWF from the USA Network in May 1998. Hammer, who has openly credited Diller as her mentor, in later years was on the board of directors at IAC/InterActiveCorp.

Diller's acquisition of the USA Network, which also allowed for Universal Pictures to maintain a significant 45% minority ownership stock in the network, also resulted in his acquiring ownership of Universal's television assets as well.

The purpose of the network was to have the flagship, WAMI, produce sports and news programming while testing locally produced general-interest programming for the other stations in the group. Due to the high costs of producing and acquiring talent for shows outside the typical areas of New York City and Los Angeles, plus the significantly low ratings such shows received in Miami Beach, the remaining shows were moved to Los Angeles to regain traction, but never did. Diller eventually sold the TV assets to Univision after rejecting a bid from The Walt Disney Company. The USA Network and its assets were later sold off to Vivendi. Diller was still involved with the USA Network until the Vivendi sale was announced in December 2001. Diller retained the assets of the Home Shopping Network and the subsequent Internet assets he acquired later to bolster the HSN Online stable that later became IAC/InterActiveCorp.

=== 2000s ===
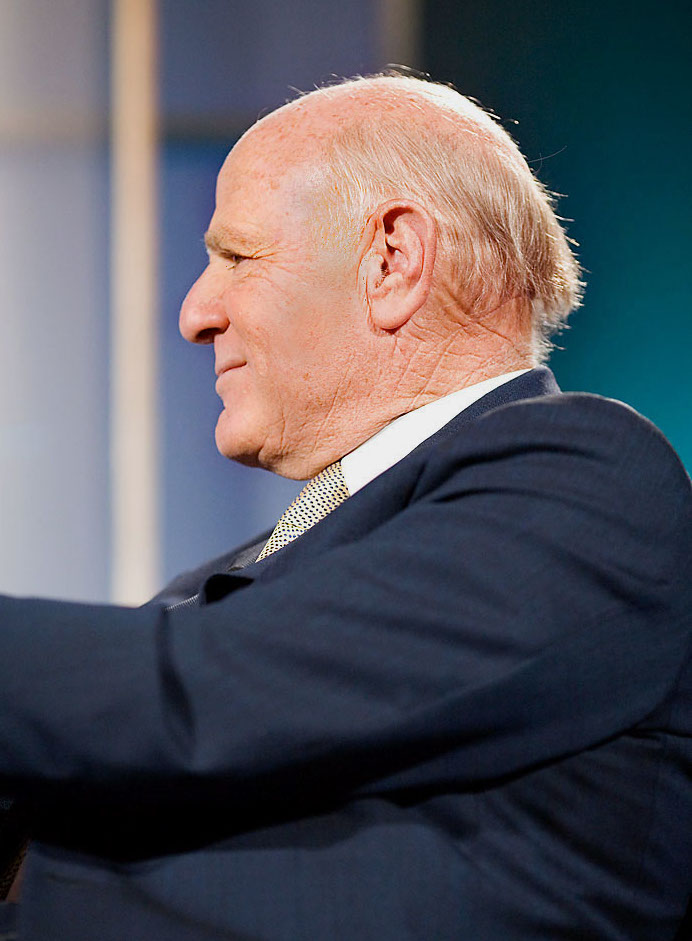
Barry Diller at the Web 2.0 Conference 2005

Diller was the Chairman of Expedia and the Chairman of IAC/InterActiveCorp, an interactive commerce conglomerate and the parent of companies including HomeAdvisor, Match Group (until 2020), Citysearch, and Connected Ventures, home of Vimeo and CollegeHumor (until 2020). IAC/InterActiveCorp is also the parent company of Tinder, Urbanspoon, The Daily Beast, and more. In 2005, IAC/InterActiveCorp acquired Ask.com, marking a strategic move into the Internet search category. He stepped down as chief executive officer of IAC/InterActiveCorp on December 2, 2010.

The new headquarters for the IAC/InterActiveCorp, the IAC Building was designed by Frank Gehry and opened in 2007 at 18th Street and the West Side Highway in Manhattan's Chelsea neighborhood. The western half of the block is dedicated to the building, which stands several stories taller than the massive Chelsea Piers sporting complex just across the West Side Highway. The extra floors guarantee a panoramic Hudson River view from Diller's sixth-floor office.

Diller has been on the board of Coca-Cola since 2002.

In 2003, on the PBS program NOW with Bill Moyers, Diller voiced a strong warning against media consolidation. In the interview he referred to media ownership by a few big corporations as an oligarchy, saying the concentration strangles new ideas.

Diller was "the highest-paid executive [of fiscal year 2005]", according to a report by The New York Times on October 26, 2006, with total compensation in excess of $295 million (mostly from stock).

Since 2013, Diller has co-produced more than ten Broadway shows in partnership with Scott Rudin, including To Kill A Mockingbird, West Side Story, Carousel, The Humans, Three Tall Women, Gary: A Sequel to Titus Andronicus, and A Doll's House, Part 2. IAC Films has also backed numerous films produced by Rudin, including Uncut Gems, Lady Bird, Eighth Grade, The Meyerowitz Stories, and Ex Machina.

In October 2019, Diller had a $4.2 billion fortune in technology companies, after investing early on in companies such as Match.com and Vimeo. In 2012, Diller became an investor in the streaming service company Aereo. Aereo went out of business in June 2014 after the United States Supreme Court ruled that its method of streaming media content violated copyright laws.

=== 2020s ===
In early 2020, Diller took over Expedia's day-to-day operations alongside the vice chairman Peter Kern, after the company's CFO stepped down in December 2019. In the midst of the COVID-19 pandemic, Expedia's shares plummeted along with those of other travel companies. Diller announced that Expedia was generating no revenue and would have to cut costs. And he has been member of the advisory board of the Peter G. Peterson Foundation.

Simon & Schuster published Diller's memoir Who Knew on May 20, 2025. That year, Diller expressed interest in buying CNN.

== "The Killer Dillers" ==
Diller is responsible for what the media dubs "The Killer Dillers" – people whom Diller mentored and who later became major media and internet executives in their own right. Examples include Michael Eisner (who was President of Paramount Pictures while Diller was its chairman & CEO, and went on to become chairman & CEO of The Walt Disney Company), Jeffrey Katzenberg (a head of production of Paramount under Diller who became a co-founder of DreamWorks SKG and former head of DreamWorks Animation and Walt Disney Studios), Strauss Zelnick (President at Fox while Diller was its chairman and CEO who became the founder and CEO of private equity firm ZMC, the chairman and CEO of video game company Take-Two Interactive), Don Simpson (who was President of Production at Paramount under Diller and Eisner before forming an independent production company initially based on the Paramount lot with Jerry Bruckheimer), Dara Khosrowshahi (CEO of Uber), Dawn Steel (a VP of Production for Paramount when Diller was Chair & CEO; she went on to become President of Columbia Pictures, one of the first women to run a major movie studio) and Garth Ancier (former president of BBC America).

Diller worked with Stephen Chao at Fox Television Network, whom he later hired as President of Programming and Marketing at USA Network. Julius Genachowski, chairman of the Federal Communications Commission, was Diller's General Counsel during their tenure at USA Broadcasting, and as a member of Diller's Office of the Chairman at IAC/InterActiveCorp. Jamie Kellner, who later joined Warner Bros. and created The WB television network, was also the first executive Diller hired to manage the Fox Broadcasting Company.

== Personal life ==
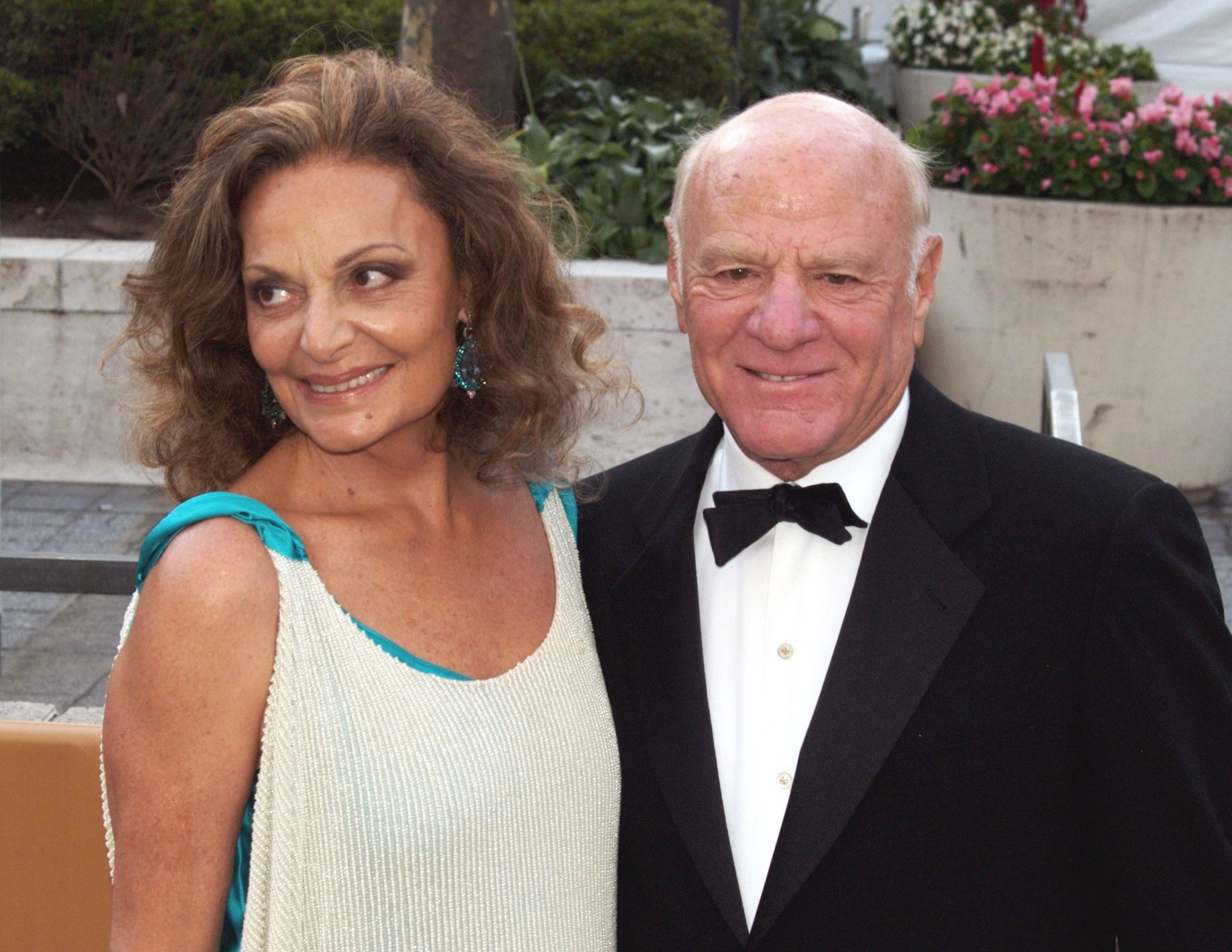
Diller with his wife Diane von Fürstenberg at the 2009 Metropolitan Opera premiere

In 2001, Diller married fashion designer Diane von Fürstenberg, mother of Prince Alexander von Fürstenberg and Princess Tatiana von Fürstenberg. Diller owns an estimated third of her eponymous fashion company. As of June 2020, Diller's estimated net worth was $4.2 billion. He owns Eos, one of the largest private sailing yachts in the world.

In March 2026, Diller acquired former U.S. President John F. Kennedy and former First Lady Jacqueline Kennedy Onassis' former penthouse at Carlyle Hotel in New York City for $11 million.

=== Sexual orientation ===
The media has speculated on Diller's sexual orientation. As reported in James B. Stewart's 2005 book DisneyWar, Michael Eisner sent a confidential letter to The Walt Disney Company board of directors in 1997 during its search for a successor to Eisner.

Pressed by the board to name a successor, Mr. Eisner cited the entertainment executive Barry Diller, but then wrote a confidential letter to the board saying that "the fact he is a homosexual should have no weight," which, at the time, all but guaranteed Mr. Diller would never succeed him.

— James B. Stewart, DisneyWar (2005)

New York wrote in 2001 that Diller is "often referred to as bisexual", having "lived most of his adult life as a more or less openly gay man", while his relationship with Diane von Fürstenberg "is said to be a warm and genuine one". Diller wrote about his homosexual relationships in his 2025 memoir Who Knew.

== Political activities ==
Diller is a member of the Democratic Party and supporter of related political causes. In 2012, he stated his support for Barack Obama's reelection campaign despite misgivings with aspects of the Obama administration's record, and expressed his approval of then-Mayor of New York City Michael Bloomberg. In 2015, Diller criticized Republican candidate Donald Trump's impact on political discourse and said he would leave the country if he was elected.

During the 2020 Democratic primary, Diller expressed reservations over Elizabeth Warren, but stated he would support her over Trump if she was nominated. In 2024, Diller was among those who called for U.S. President Joe Biden to end his bid for re-election after his poor debate performance and other disconcerting signs on the campaign trail. Diller along with fellow billionaire Reid Hoffman said that Kamala Harris should replace FTC chair Lina Khan in a potential Harris administration.

According to Maureen Dowd in an interview with Diller, "he did admit to one damning thing: 'I introduced Rupert Murdoch to Roger Ailes.'" In the interview, Diller "defended his "very, very dear, loving friend" Jeff Bezos's killing of the Washington Post's endorsement of Kamala Harris. Diller also defended Shari Redstone in her capitulation to Trump saying, "the idea of settling this idiot suit is horrible" but found it understandable to "bend the knee if there's a guillotine at your head". Diller said, "I'm so angry at the Democratic progressivism and elite nonsense of the last decade (...) I hate the woke right as much as I hate the woke left. A ban on both their houses."

Diller and von Fürstenberg donated a combined $105,000 to Kathy Hochul between 2021 and 2022.

== Philanthropy ==
In 2011, the Diller-von Fürstenberg Family Foundation announced a donation of $20 million to support the completion of the High Line park in Manhattan. In 2012, Diller donated $30 million to the Hollywood Fund, which provides health and social care to retired individuals from the show-business world.

In 2015, Diller and his wife committed to donate $260 million toward Little Island, a public park and performance space on a reconstructed pier 55 in the Hudson River in New York City. It is stated to be the largest donation to a public park in city history. The park was completed on May 21, 2021.

== Honors and recognition ==
- 1990: DGA Honorary Life Member Award
- 1992: Golden Plate Award of the American Academy of Achievement
- 1994: Television Hall of Fame

Business positions
Preceded by unknown	Vice President of ABC, Prime-Time Programming; 1973–1974	Succeeded by unknown
Preceded by	Chairman & CEO of Paramount Pictures; 1974–1984	Succeeded by Frank Mancuso Sr.
Preceded by	Chairman & CEO of 20th Century Fox; 1984–1992	Succeeded by
Preceded by established	President of FOX Broadcasting Company; 1986–1992	Succeeded by Rupert Murdoch
