= Teo Wan Lin =

Singaporean dermatologist

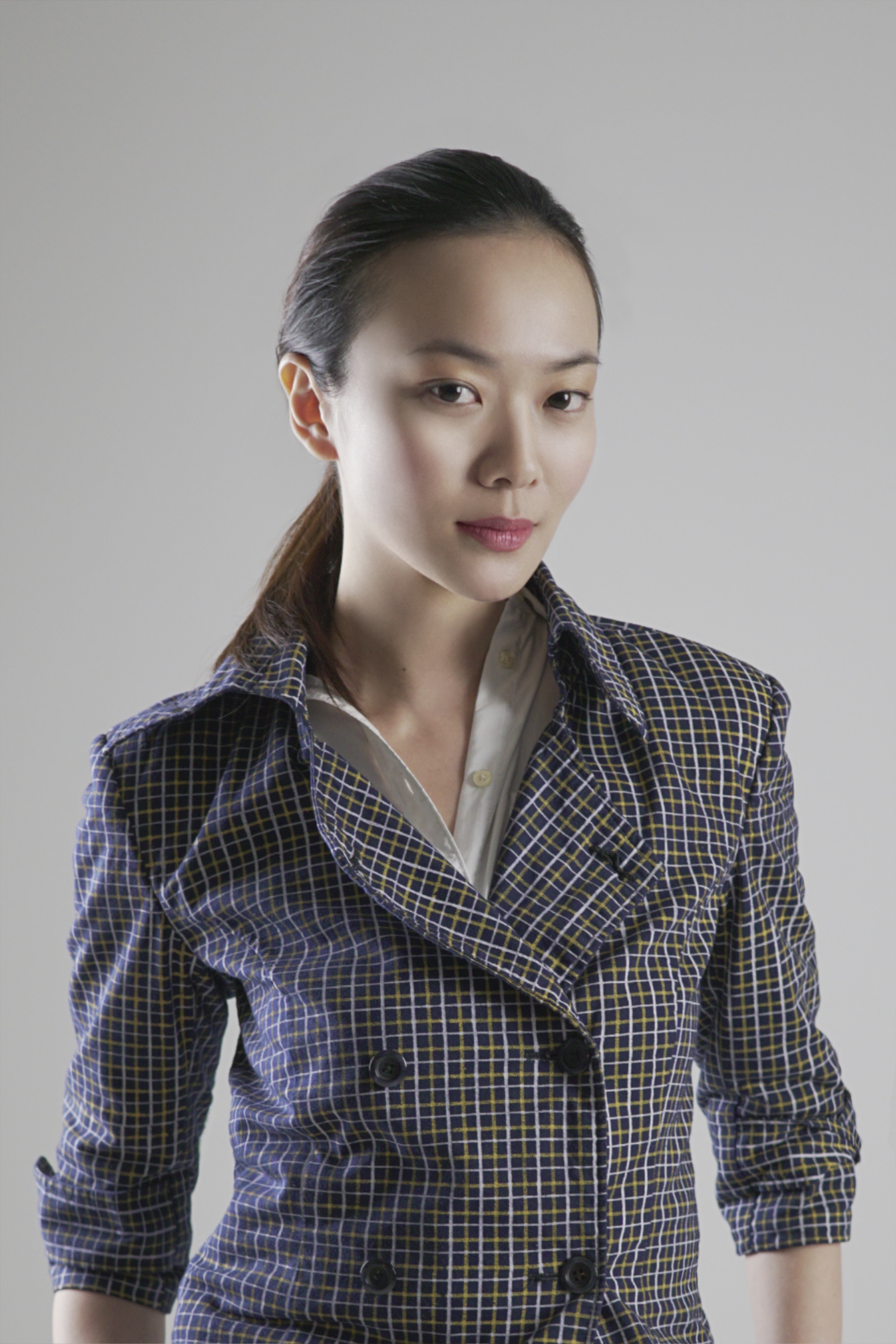
- Born: 21 March 1984 (age 42); Singapore
- Education: National University of Singapore
- Occupation: Dermatologist
- Medical career
- Field: Dermatology
- Research: Skin care

Teo Wan Lin (Zhang Wanlin; Chinese: 张婉琳; born 21 March 1984) is a Singaporean dermatologist, medical director at TWL Specialist Skin & Laser Centre and the founder of Dr.TWL Dermaceuticals, a cosmeceutical skincare line. She is also the host of a podcast Dermatologist Talks - Science of Beauty on Spotify. She is known in the media for her work in botany relating to cosmeceuticals.

== Early life and education ==
Teo Wan Lin obtained her Bachelor of Medicine and Surgery Degree from the National University of Singapore. Afterwards, she became a medical specialist dermatologist, certified by the Specialist Accreditation Board in Singapore. She is a Fellow of the Academy of Medicine, Singapore (College of Physicians, Chapter of Dermatologists) and a Member of the Royal College of Surgeons in the United Kingdom.

She was a former national team épée fencer and she represented Singapore in multiple international and regional competitions, including the Fencing World Cup and the 2007 Summer Universiade held in Bangkok. She was formerly a model, represented by international modelling agency, AVE Management. She has been featured in several beauty editorials/advertorials including Her World, CITA BELLA, Shape, Cleo, URBAN, Style Weddings, as well as in print/commercial advertisements for Maybelline, Kosé, Fresh Kon, Tiger Beer, CapitaLand Malls, Citibank, Singtel, amongst others. She was also featured in a regional campaign for Sony Ericsson in Hong Kong in 2006.

== Career ==
In 2019, Teo developed a custom lipstick laboratory which features an edible lipstick formula. Her concept of personalised cosmetics in a tolerable base, suitable for eczema, rosacea and sensitive skin individuals, was featured in Cosmetics Design Asia.

In 2020, she invented a fabric mask to treat acne with biofunctional textiles under Dr.TWL Biomaterials, which was featured in The Straits Times A-Z inventions of Coronavirus disease 2019. Her concept was published in the Journal of the American Academy of Dermatology in her research letter - Diagnostic and management considerations for "maskne" in the era of COVID-19, on October 1, 2020. In the same year, she founded Dr.TWL Pharmacy, a skincare e-pharmacy concept integrated with teledermatology.

In a 2024/2025 announcement, Teo confirmed she had stepped away from her clinical practice in Singapore to lead a new global initiative. Her focus shifted to a research and development lab based in Seoul, South Korea, which aims to integrate modern dermatological science with principles from traditional Asian ethnobotany, such as Chinese remedies and Korean Hanbang. Teo stated that her dermatological work would now be channeled exclusively through her skincare line, The Founder's Formula.

In 2026, Teo formalized her research initiatives by establishing the Dr.TWL Skin Institute, a transnational research body dedicated to Asian Bio-Dermatology. This move marked the evolution of her original Founder's Formula into the Bibang Formula™, a system focused on the integration of botanical ethnobotany and biotechnological fermentation. The Institute, which maintains research divisions in China and Singapore, focuses on proprietary protocols such as the Fermentation Facelift™, aimed at enhancing the bioavailability of active ingredients through enzymatic hydrolysis. Teo continues to lead the Institute as Medical Director, focusing exclusively on dermatological research and the development of clinical-grade skincare systems.

== Campaigns ==
Teo was featured in Dior's Digital Skincare Talk as a skincare expert, hosted by Gisele Bündchen and Phillip Picardi in October 2020. She has collaborated with skincare brands Clinique and Mentholatum to create scientific educational content.

In 2019, Teo was featured in the "#InCharge" campaign for Diane von Fürstenberg, in collaboration with Muse Magazine Singapore. She collaborated with Gillette Venus Sensitive Razor Campaign for their launch video as a sensitive skin expert.
