= Alexandra von Fürstenberg =

American socialite

- Born: Alexandra Natasha Miller; October 3, 1972 (age 53); British Hong Kong
- Education: The New School; Brown University
- Occupations: Socialite, Heiress, Entrepreneur, Designer
- Spouses: Prince Alexander von Fürstenberg (m. 1995; div. 2002); Dax Miller (m. 2015)
- Children: Talita von Fürstenberg; Tassilo von Fürstenberg
- Parents: Robert Warren Miller (father); María Clara Pesantes Becerra (mother)
- Family: Princess Maria-Olympia (niece); Prince Constantine-Alexios (nephew); Prince Achilleas-Andreas (nephew)

Alexandra Natasha von Fürstenberg (née Miller; born October 3, 1972) is a Hong Kong-born American heiress, socialite, entrepreneur and furniture designer based in Los Angeles. She is the youngest daughter of American billionaire and DFS Group co-founder Robert Warren Miller.

== Early life ==
Alexandra Miller was born in 1972, in British Hong Kong to American entrepreneur Robert Warren Miller and his Ecuadoran wife, María Clara "Chantal" (née Pesantes Becerra). She has two older sisters Pia and Marie-Chantal. Alexandra and her sisters grew up between Hong Kong, Paris and New York.

She attended Parsons School of Design and Brown University, where she studied costume design and art history.

In the 1990s, Miller and her sisters were popularly dubbed by New York high society as the Miller Sisters.

== Career ==
In 1995, Alexandra joined the design team of her then mother-in-law, Diane von Fürstenberg. During her ten-year career at DVF as Creative Director and later as Director of Image, Alexandra was instrumental in the re-launch of the iconic wrap dress as well as reinforcing the relevance of this American brand.

After relocating to Los Angeles in 2005, Alexandra focused on designing exclusively for the home. In 2007, she created Alexandra Von Furstenberg, LLC, the brand, to create modern furniture and home accessories made of acrylic. She originally began by designing for her personal home, and then realized there was a market for her designs. In March 2008, she launched her first designs.

== Personal life ==
On October 28, 1995, at the Church of St. Ignatius of Loyola in New York City, she married Prince Alexander von Fürstenberg, the son of the fashion designer Diane von Fürstenberg and Prince Egon von Fürstenberg. They have two children, Princess Talita Natasha (born May 7, 1999) and Prince Tassilo Egon Maximilian (born August 26, 2001). The couple divorced in 2002.

She is the godmother of her nephew Prince Constantine Alexios of Greece and Denmark.

On July 7, 2015, Alexandra married longtime fiancé, architectural designer and developer Dax Miller. The couple wed on the seventh anniversary of the start of their relationship.
