= Canadian royalty =

Canadian royalty may refer to Canadians; who are members of royal families, Canadian through birth, naturalization, or marriage; or Canadian families that are given the epithet or moniker as Canadian royalty or Canadian royals. Additionally, Canada is a monarchy, so members of the Canadian monarchy are Canadian royalty.

== Former monarchies of Canada ==
=== Former colonial monarchies of territory now Canada ===
- French monarchy (House of Bourbon), of the colony of New France
- English monarchy (House of Stuart), prior to the UK's Act of Union, for the colony of Newfoundland
- Norwegian monarchy, for the Sverdrup Islands.
- Danish monarchy and Norwegian monarchy, for Viking colonies

=== Indigenous Native royals ===
Many tribes, bands, nations, have or still have inherited chieftainships, with hereditary chiefs. Canadian colonization of the land required that these First Nations groups have elected band councils and tribal chiefs, which the federal government would recognize and deal with. The colonial expansion also resulted in waves of diseases that have wiped out some hereditary lineages. None of the remaining hereditary chiefs or lineages are recognized as royal by the Canadian governments.

== Royalty ==
=== Royal house of Canada ===
Royal arms of Canada

Members of the royal house of the monarchy of Canada are the royalty of Canada de jure

- House of Windsor, ruling dynasty of the Canadian monarchy

Had Great Britain been invaded by Nazi Germany during World War II, the British (sic Canadian) royal family would have relocated to Canada, during Operation Rocking Horse, into Hatley Castle, Victoria, BC.

==== Members of the House of Windsor who resided in Canada ====
- Prince Harry, Duke of Sussex, member of the House of Windsor (Note: The Duke and Duchess of Sussex stepped back from royal duties, stopped actively using their HRH stylings and ceased to be representatives of the monarchy, as a result of their decision to become financially independent and move to North America.)
  - Meghan, Duchess of Sussex, wife of Prince Harry
- Princess Alice, Countess of Athlone, member of the House of Windsor, was wife of a Canadian Governor General.
  - Alexander Cambridge, 1st Earl of Athlone, Governor General of Canada, husband to Princess Alice.
- Prince Arthur, Duke of Connaught and Strathearn, Governor General of Canada, member of the House of Windsor.
  - Princess Louise Margaret of Prussia, wife of Prince Arthur
  - Princess Patricia of Connaught, daughter of Arthur and Louise Margaret
- Princess Louise, Marchioness of Lorne, member of the House of Windsor, was wife of a Canadian Governor General.
  - John Campbell, Marquess of Lorne, Governor General of Canada, husband to Princess Louise.

==== Canadians romantically associated with the House of Windsor ====
Several Canadians have had very serious relationships just short of marriage, and could have entered into the House of Windsor

- John Turner of Montreal, Prime Minister of Canada; was mooted to become husband to Princess Margaret, though politically problematical due to his Catholicism, would need her to renounce her claim to the throne.

=== Royalty who were born in Canada ===
- Princess Margriet of the Netherlands, was born in Ottawa during the House of Orange's exile in World War II. By some measures, she was the first royal baby born in North America.
- Prince Hermann Friedrich of Leiningen (usually: Hermann Leiningen), at the time of his birth, was 50th in line to the British throne; is the grandson of the King of Bulgaria; was born in Toronto.

=== Royalty in long term residence in Canada ===
- Queen Juliana of the Netherlands, spent WWII, as the Princess, in exile in Ottawa.
  - Queen Beatrix of the Netherlands, aka Trixie Orange, spent World War II, as Princess, in exile in Ottawa.
  - Princess Irene of the Netherlands, spent WWII in exile in Ottawa.
- Prince Edward, Duke of Kent and Strathearn, lived in the Canadas and Nova Scotia from 1791 to 1800. From 1794 to 1802, he held the position as the Commander-in-Chief of the Maritimes.

== Royalty by reputation ==
=== Maritally and lineally associated with the Royal Houses of Canada ===
- Autumn Phillips (Canadian born Autumn Kelly), of Montreal, married Peter Phillips in 2008, son of Princess Anne; then divorced in 2021. She was considered a part of the Royal Family, the first Canadian so entering the royal family.
  - Peter Phillips, married Autumn Kelly of Montreal (2008-2021), son of Princess Anne, the Princess Royale, daughter of Queen Elizabeth II, therebeing the grandson of Elizabeth II. Peter does not have an HRH title, as Princess Anne rejected the proposal for her children Peter and Zara, the first born to a princess without titles in 500 years in Britain. Phillips was a member of the line-of-succession to the throne.
    - Savannah Phillips, born to Autumn and Peter, great-grandchild of Elizabeth II. She was in the line of succession to the throne under Elizabeth II. She is the most senior Canadian in the line of succession.
    - Isla Phillips, born to Autumn and Peter, great-grandchild of Elizabeth II. She was in the line of succession to the throne under Elizabeth II. She is the second most senior Canadian in the line of succession.

== See also ==
- Canadian peers and baronets
- Monarchist League of Canada (Canadian royalists)
