= Isabel Getty =

American singer and artist (born 1993)

- Also known as: Izzy Getty
- Born: Isabel Getty; November 11, 1993 (age 32); London, United Kingdom
- Education: New York University
- Genres: Pop; rock
- Occupations: Singer, visual artist, curator
- Years active: 2016–present
- Spouse: Faris McKinnon (m. 2026)

Isabel Getty (born November 11, 1993) is a British-American singer, visual artist and curator. She is the lead singer of the London-based rock band Jean Marlow.

== Early life and family ==
Isabel Getty is the daughter of Christopher Getty and Pia Miller. She is a member of the Getty family and the paternal great-granddaughter of J. Paul Getty, the founder of Getty Oil. Her maternal grandfather, Robert Warren Miller, is the co-founder of DFS Group. She grew up in New York City and in London.

== Education ==
Getty attended The Harrodian School in London. After high school, she enrolled at Tisch School of the Arts's Clive Davis Institute of Recorded Music at New York University, graduating in 2016. Later, Isabel did her Masters at Imperial College in London, and graduated in 2025.

== Career ==
In May 2013, while Getty was still reticent about public performance, Diana Ross assisted her in dealing with stage fright by bringing her onstage to perform, in a moment that Getty described as "pretty epic".

In April 2016, Getty appeared alongside two of her first cousins, Princess Maria-Olympia of Greece and Denmark and Princess Talita von Fürstenberg, in a Vanity Fair feature paying tribute to their mothers.

After graduating from New York University in 2016, Getty moved to London where she worked on Spin, an EP that was later released by her rock band, Jean Marlow. In 2017, Jean Marlow toured across Europe and the United States for the first time.

Getty debuted her paintings at Faramacy in London in the summer of 2017. She has also designed the album artwork for her band. She works as an assistant to British contemporary artist Marc Quinn.

She has modeled in editorials and walked the runway for Dolce & Gabbana. She was featured in Dolce & Gabbana's #DGCAPRI sunglass campaign and walked in their 2017 Fashion Week show. In August 2017, she was featured on the cover of Vogue Japan.

Isabel started her own Gallery, The Graduate Gallery, along with her business partner, in 2022, representing emerging young artists in London.

== Personal life ==
In October 2025, Getty had her first child, a son named Viggo, with her boyfriend, financier Faris McKinnon. She and McKinnon married on 3 September 2026 at Chelsea Old Town Hall in London.
