= Tatiana von Fürstenberg =

American singer-songwriter, actress, philanthropist, film writer, director and producer

Princess Tatiana
- Born: Tatiana Desirée Prinzessin zu Fürstenberg; February 16, 1971 (age 55); New York City, U.S.
- Spouse: Russell Steinberg (m. 2002; div. 2014)
- Issue: Antonia Steinberg
- House: Fürstenberg
- Father: Prince Egon von Fürstenberg
- Mother: Diane Halfin
- Occupation: Writer, director, producer, actress, singer-songwriter, philanthropist

Princess Tatiana Desirée von Fürstenberg (Tatiana Desirée Prinzessin zu Fürstenberg; born February 16, 1971) is an American art curator, singer-songwriter, actress, philanthropist, and filmmaker.

== Early life and family ==
Von Fürstenberg was born on February 16, 1971, in New York City to fashion designers Prince Egon von Fürstenberg and Diane von Fürstenberg (née Halfin). On her mother's side she is of Jewish Moldovan, and Jewish Greek descent. On her father's side she is of German and Italian descent, and a member of the House of Fürstenberg. Her paternal grandparents were Prince Tassilo zu Fürstenberg and Clara Agnelli, the elder sister of Fiat's chairman, Gianni Agnelli. She is the younger sister of Prince Alexander von Fürstenberg.

Her parents divorced in 1972, although the family remained close, and she had a great relationship with both her maternal and paternal grandmothers, Holocaust survivor Liliane and Nahmias Agnelli. When she was six her mother released a perfume, Tatiana, named after her. Her father remarried Lynn Marshall in 1983. Educated at Cranborne Chase School, she went on to attend Brown University and studied modern culture and media, comparative literature, and education. After graduating in 1991 she did graduate work in applied psychology at New York University. Her mother remarried Barry Diller in 2001. Tatiana is the aunt to Talita von Fürstenberg, Tassilo von Fürstenberg, Leon von Fürstenberg, and Vito von Fürstenberg.

== Career ==
In 1992, von Fürstenberg posed for Madonna's erotic coffee table book Sex and was in the video documentary on the making of the book. Later that year, she was featured alongside other celebrities from the book in the music video for Madonna's single Erotica. Also in 1992 von Fürstenberg made cameo appearances in the films Light Sleeper and Bram Stoker's Dracula.

She was photographed by Richard Avedon for the magazine Égoïste.

Von Fürstenberg, with Francesca Gregorini, co-wrote, co-directed, and produced the 2009 film Tanner Hall, which went on to have its world premiere as an official selection at the 2009 Toronto International Film Festival and was awarded the Grand Jury Prize for Best Feature at the Gen Art Film Festival. Her voice was used for the character Poppet in the film.

In 2010 she wrote, directed, and produced the short film Tyrolean Riviera. The next year, von Fürstenberg directed a short film titled Journey of the Dress, featuring Tayane Leão and Zhang Huan, for DvF's fall collection. In 2012 she played the character Pearl in the short film Tependris Rising. The next year, she worked again with Gregorini to produce the drama thriller indie film The Truth About Emanuel.

Von Fürstenberg is a songwriter and the lead singer of the band Playdate. The band was founded in 1999 and is made up of von Fürstenberg, Andrew Bradfield, and Bryan Bullett. The trio met while students at Brown University. One of the band's songs, Moet & Chandon, was included on the soundtrack for Tanner Hall.

She worked at Steinberg and Sons, launching a west-coast branch for the New York-based company, providing independent designers with spaces to sell their work. She has served as the co-curator at the Alleged Gallery in New York City and as a director for The Diller – von Furstenberg Family Foundation.

In 2016 von Fürstenberg collaborated with the U.S. grassroots organization Black and Pink to create the art exhibit On The Inside, highlighting the work of incarcerated LGBTQ artists who are at-risk in prison. The exhibit, directed and designed by her, brings awareness to the issues and dangers LGBTQ inmates face at a higher risk than non-LGBTQ inmates, including sexual and physical assault, as well as less emotional and financial support from families due to their sexuality or gender identity. The exhibit was on display at the Abrons Arts Center. Von Fürstenberg incorporated an interactive element into the show where viewers can text the incarcerated artists, through a special service, to give feedback and set up long term pen-pal relationships.

== Personal life ==
In the 2024 documentary Diane von Furstenberg: Woman in Charge, it was acknowledged that Tatiana and her brother Alexander were raised by their maternal grandmother Liliane Nahmias Halfin after their mother began spending more time in France in the early 1980s. Despite hardly seeing her mother by the early 1980s, Tatiana's brother, Alexander, has stated that there was still affection between them, and that they became close again after returning to the United States in the 1990s.

In 2000 von Fürstenberg, who was dating actor and writer Russell Steinberg, gave birth to their daughter Antonia. They married two years later and divorced in 2014.

In 2010, von Fürstenberg had an editing studio built in her Los Feliz home. She also owns Norman Mailer's former home in Provincetown.
