= Pia Getty =

American heiress and socialite (born 1966)

- Born: Pia Christina Miller; 1966 (age 59–60); New York City, U.S.
- Occupations: Filmmaker, socialite, and heiress
- Spouse: Christopher Ronald Getty (m. 1992; div. 2005)
- Children: 4, including Isabel Getty
- Father: Robert Warren Miller
- Family: Princess Maria-Olympia (niece); Prince Constantine-Alexios (nephew); Prince Achilleas-Andreas (nephew); Prince Odysseas-Kimon (nephew); Prince Aristidis-Stavros (nephew) Talita von Fürstenberg (niece)

Pia Christina Miller Getty (born 1966) is a socialite and heiress.

== Early life ==
She is the eldest daughter of Robert Warren Miller, an American-born British businessman, and wife María Clara "Chantal" Pesantes Becerra, an Ecuadorian, and sister of Marie-Chantal, Crown Princess of Greece and Princess Alexandra von Fürstenberg, a trio dubbed "the Miller Sisters".

Getty spent her childhood in Hong Kong and attended Le Rosey School in Switzerland. She briefly attended Barnard College in New York and later studied art history at Georgetown University.

== Career ==
Getty is the American spokeswoman for the cosmetics company Sephora. She is frequently featured in Vogue, Vanity Fair, and other society magazines.

Her first feature documentary film, China Power - Art Now After Mao, released in 2008, focused on China's burgeoning art scene.

== Personal life ==
In 1992, in Bali, she married Getty Oil heir Christopher Ronald Getty, grandson of Jean Paul Getty. The couple have four children including Isabel Getty. They divorced in 2005. She is the godmother of her niece, Princess Maria-Olympia of Greece and Denmark.
