= Princess Maria-Olympia of Greece and Denmark =

Member of the Greek former royal family (born 1996)

Princess Maria-Olympia
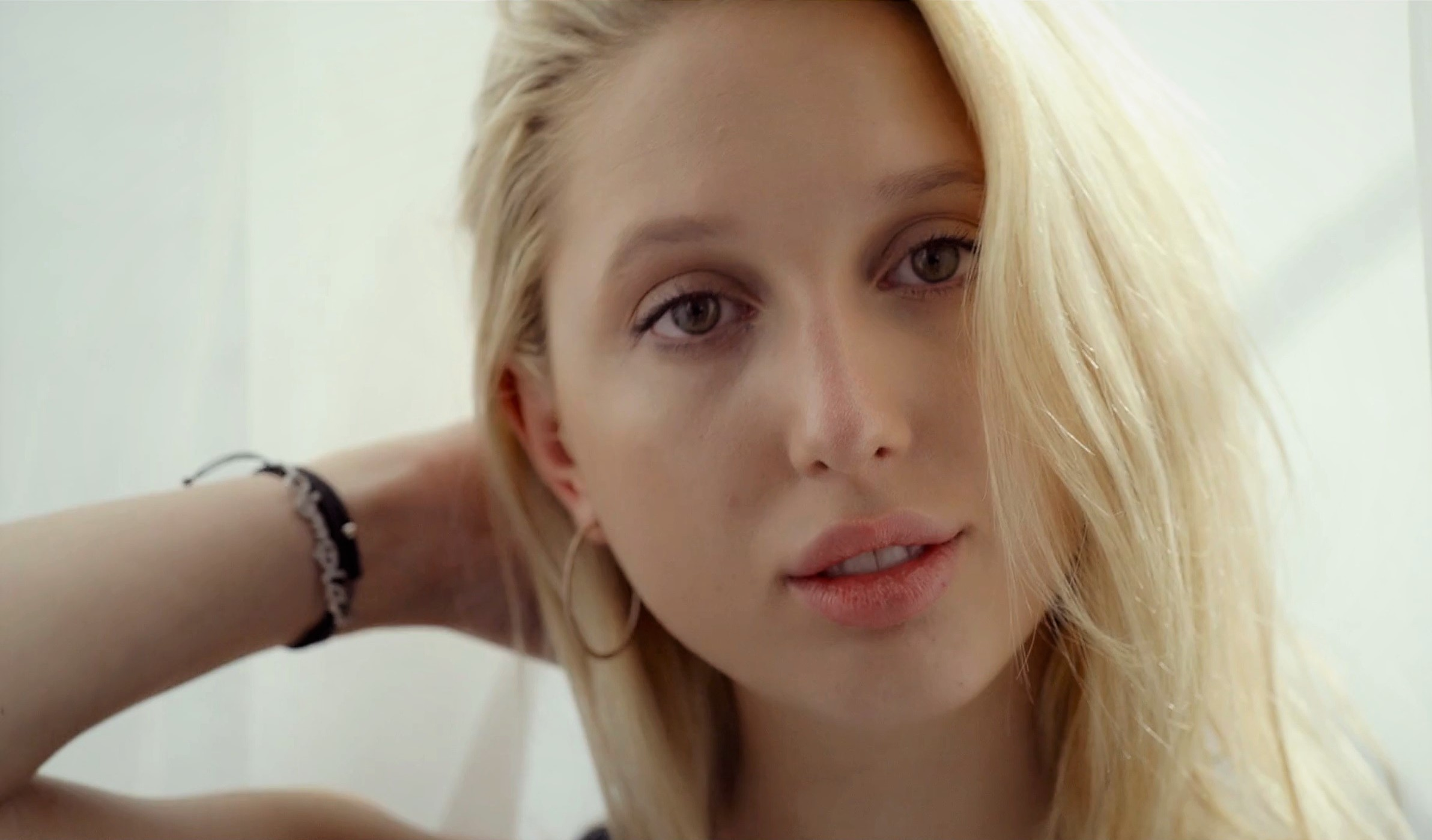
- Olympia in 2019
- Born: 25 July 1996 (age 30); Weill Cornell Medical Center, New York City, U.S.
- House: Glücksburg
- Father: Pavlos, Crown Prince of Greece
- Mother: Marie-Chantal Miller
- Occupation: Model, socialite

Princess Maria-Olympia of Greece and Denmark (Greek: Μαρία Ολυμπία Ντε Γκρες, romanized: María-Olympía de Grèce; born 25 July 1996) is a fashion model, socialite and member of the former Greek royal family. She is the oldest child and only daughter of Pavlos, Crown Prince of Greece, and his wife, Marie-Chantal Miller. Her paternal grandparents are Constantine II of Greece and Anne-Marie of Denmark, who were the last King and Queen of the Hellenes, while her maternal grandfather is duty free entrepreneur Robert Warren Miller.

== Early life ==
Princess Maria-Olympia of Greece and Denmark was born on 25 July 1996 at Weill Cornell Medical Center in Lenox Hill, New York in Manhattan to Pavlos, Crown Prince of Greece, and his wife, Marie-Chantal. She was baptized in the Greek Orthodox Church by Patriarch Bartholomew I of Constantinople at the Church of St. George in Istanbul, Turkey, on 22 December 1996. Her godparents are her paternal aunt Princess Alexia of Greece and Denmark, her maternal aunt Pia Getty, her grandfather's second cousin Charles III, and Prince Michael of Greece and Denmark. Her family relocated to London, where she spent most of her childhood. She is the older sister of Prince Constantine-Alexios, Prince Achileas-Andreas, Prince Odysseas Kimon, and Prince Aristidis-Stavros.

She uses the name Olympia in everyday life. Olympia attended her first couture show around the age of 11 in Rome together with her parents. She studied art history, theatre, photography, and graphic design while in boarding school in Switzerland with hopes of pursuing a career in art or fashion. She interned in Dior's couture department, at the age of 17.

Maria-Olympia registered at college in New York in the fall of 2015. In 2016, she studied photography at Parsons School of Design in New York. In 2019, she completed her studies with a degree in Fashion Business and Marketing from New York University's Gallatin School of Individualized Study.

She is dyslexic.

== Fashion career ==
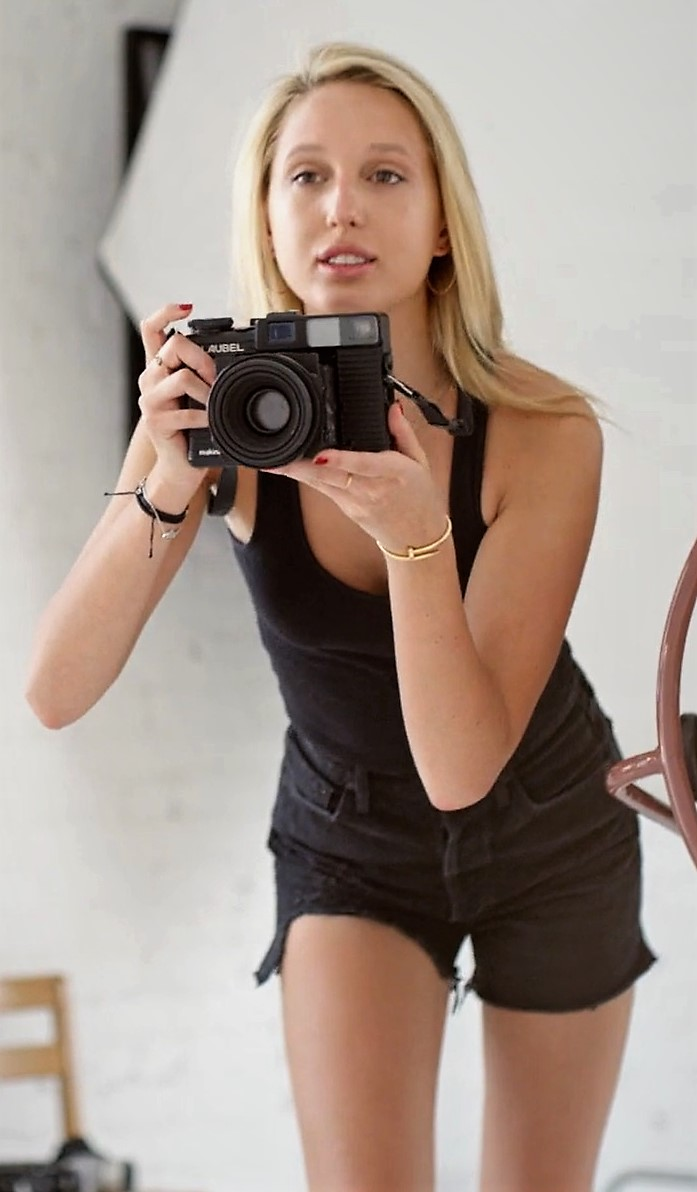
Olympia with camera, in 2019

In April 2016, Maria-Olympia posed alongside two of her first cousins, Isabel Getty and Princess Talita von Fürstenberg in a Vanity Fair feature.

She has modeled for Teen Vogue, Town & Country, Tatler, Hello!, ¡Hola!, and W. In June 2017, Maria-Olympia walked the runway for Dolce & Gabbana. She has also modeled for Michael Kors.

Using her name Olympia the Saks Potts S/S 2019 show during Copenhagen Fashion Week in August 2018 was named OLYMPIA after her and opened by the princess herself as the first model on the stage.

She became the face for Pretty Ballerinas's Spring/Summer 2019 collection.

== Personal life ==
The media reported in May 2016 that Maria-Olympia was romantically linked with Prince Harry, but a representative of the British royal family denied the claims. From 2021 to 2023, she was in a relationship with Peregrine Pearson, the son of Michael Pearson, 4th Viscount Cowdray.

On 28 September 2024, she served as a bridesmaid at the wedding of her aunt Princess Theodora of Greece and Denmark and Matthew Kumar at the Metropolitan Cathedral in Athens.

Οn 20 December 2024, Maria-Olympia acquired Greek citizenship, along with other members of the former Greek royal family, under the surname de Grèce.
