= Marie-Chantal, Crown Princess of Greece =

Member of the Greek former royal family (born 1968)

Marie-Chantal
- Crown Princess of Greece
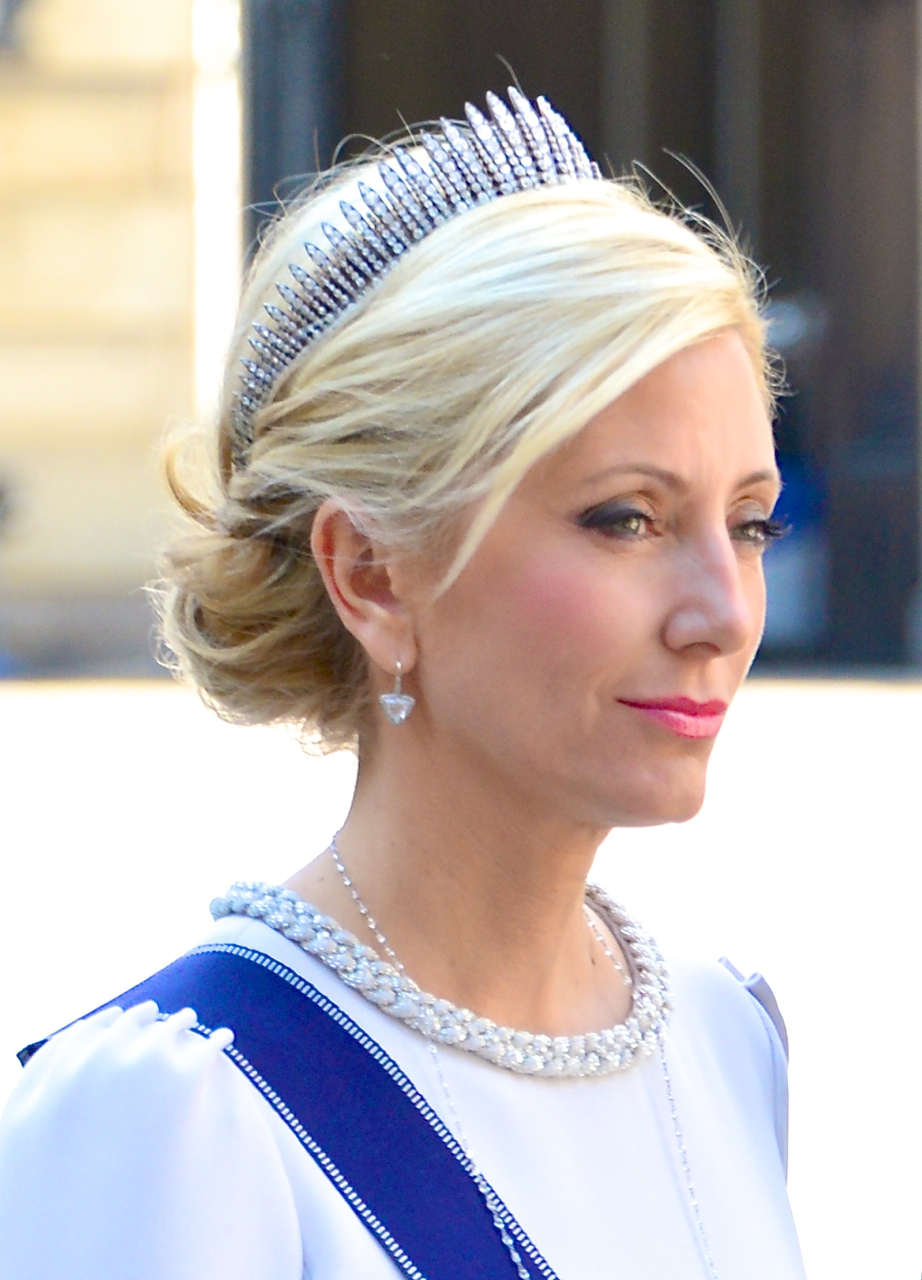
- Marie-Chantal in 2013
- Born: Marie-Chantal Claire Miller; 17 September 1968 (age 57); Ealing, London, England
- Spouse: Pavlos, Crown Prince of Greece (m. 1995)
- Issue: Princess Maria-Olympia; Prince Constantine-Alexios; Prince Achileas-Andreas; Prince Odysseas-Kimon; Prince Aristidis-Stavros
- Father: Robert Warren Miller
- Mother: María Clara Pesantes Becerra

Marie-Chantal, Crown Princess of Greece, Princess of Denmark (Note: As the wife of a male-line descendant of King Christian IX of Denmark, she is legally a Danish princess.) (Greek: Μαρί Σαντάλ; née Marie-Chantal Claire Miller; born 17 September 1968), is a member of the former Greek royal family and the extended Danish royal family. She is married to Pavlos, Crown Prince of Greece, son of King Constantine II and Queen Anne-Marie of Greece, who was heir apparent to the Greek throne until the monarchy's abolition in 1973.

== Early life, family, and education ==
Marie-Chantal Miller was born on 17 September 1968 in London, to an American-born British entrepreneur Robert Warren Miller, and his Ecuadorian wife María Clara "Chantal" Pesantes Becerra. She has an older sister, Pia, formerly married to Christopher Getty, and a younger sister, Alexandra, formerly married to Prince Alexander von Fürstenberg. She was baptized in the Catholic faith at St. Patrick's Cathedral in New York City by the Archbishop of New York, John Cardinal O'Connor, with Princess Donatella Missikoff Flick serving as her godmother.

Marie-Chantal was raised in Hong Kong where she attended The Peak School until she was 9 years old when she went to board at the Institut Le Rosey in Switzerland. In 1982, she transferred to the École Jeannine Manuel in Paris until her senior year which she took at The Masters School in New York. She interned with Andy Warhol while she was in high school. After graduating, she attended the New York Academy of Art for one year. She went back to school at Sarah Lawrence College before transferring to New York University's Gallatin School of Individualized Study but left before graduating. She also attended the Fashion Institute of Technology for one semester.

== Marriage ==
She and Pavlos first met in 1993 at a social event in New Orleans hosted by Greek shipping magnate Stavros Niarchos, and became engaged in 1994 during a holiday in Gstaad, Switzerland where Pavlos proposed to her on a ski lift with a cabochon-cut sapphire and heart-shaped diamond ring.

Before their wedding, she converted from Catholicism to Greek Orthodoxy and received the name María in a private Chrismation ceremony at St Paul’s Chapel in New York on 22 May 1995.

The couple were married on 1 July 1995 at Saint Sophia Cathedral in London, in a Greek Orthodox ceremony officiated by the Archbishop of the Greek Orthodox Archdiocese of Thyateira and Great Britain and ten prelates. The ceremony was attended by multiple kings, queens and senior royals. Marie‑Chantal wore a couture gown designed by Valentino with an ivory silk skirt and lace details. The service was followed by formal receptions at Hampton Court Palace and other venues.

Upon her marriage, Marie-Chantal acquired by right under Danish dynastic law the style Her Highness and title Princess of Denmark. By contrast, the style Her Royal Highness Crown Princess of Greece derives from her husband’s position within the former Greek royal family and is used by social and dynastic courtesy only, as Greek royal titles have held no legal recognition since the abolition of the monarchy in 1974.

Dual cypher of Pavlos and Marie-Chantal

The couple have five children: Princess Maria-Olympia (b. 1996), Prince Constantine-Alexios (b. 1998), Prince Achileas-Andreas (b. 2000), Prince Odysseas-Kimon (b. 2004), and Prince Aristidis-Stavros (b. 2008).

They have lived in Connecticut, London, and New York City, relocating to the latter in the late 2010s, where they live in a historic Upper East Side townhouse.

== Activities ==
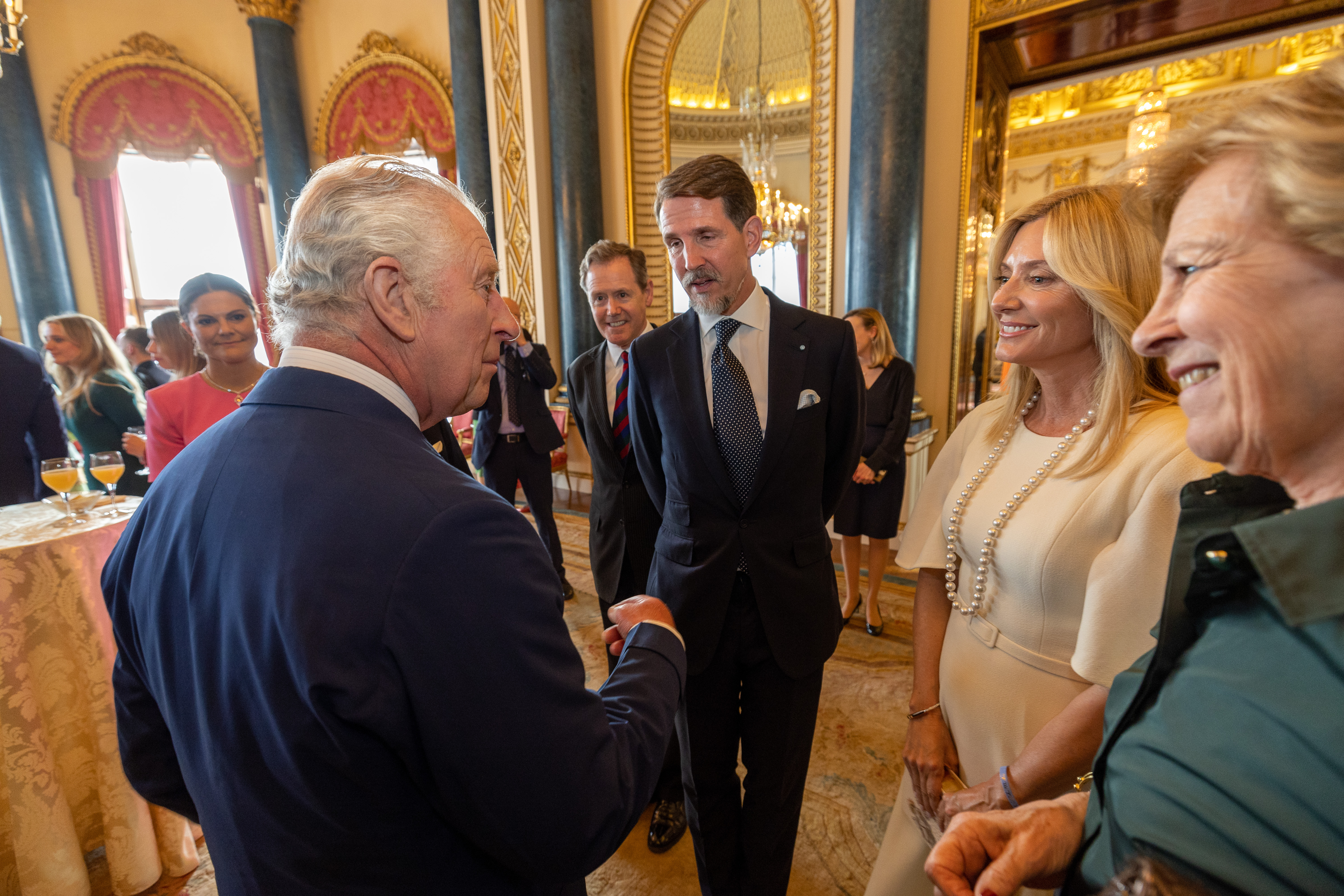
Marie-Chantal with her husband, mother-in-law and King Charles III at Buckingham Palace the evening before his coronation, 5 May 2023

In 2000, Marie-Chantal founded the luxury childrenswear brand Marie-Chantal. The brand expanded with a store in London in 2018, and with a new line of fabrics for nurseries in 2022. She collaborated with Alice Naylor-Leyland on the 2024 housewares collection, and collaborated with Silver Cross on prams.

In 2019, she published the book Manners Begin at Breakfast: Modern etiquette for families. She is a trustee of the Royal Academy Trust and a board director of DFS Group Ltd.

Her husband's family is closely related to many European royal families, particularly the Spanish and Danish royal families. Marie-Chantal has been a guest at high-profile events such as the wedding of Crown Prince Frederik of Denmark and Mary Donaldson (now King Frederik X and Queen Mary), the state funeral of Queen Elizabeth II and the coronation of King Charles III. She also attended the 2023 birthday of Christian, Crown Prince of Denmark.

== Titles, styles, honours, and arms ==
- 1 July 1995 – present: Her Royal Highness The Crown Princess of Greece

Following the deposition of the Greek monarchy in 1973, the Greek Royal Family's titles and styles are no longer legally recognised by the government of the Hellenic Republic. Marie-Chantal is also a Danish princess with the style of Highness.

=== Dynastic orders ===
- (Greece) Greek Royal Family:
  - Grand Mistress & Dame Grand Cross of the Order of Saints Olga and Sophia.
  - Grand Mistress of the Royal Order of Beneficence

=== Foreign honours ===
- Denmark:
  - Recipient of the Commemorative Medal of the Silver Jubilee of Queen Margrethe II (14 January 1997).

=== Arms ===
Coat of arms of Marie-Chantal, Crown Princess of Greece
Notes see royal coat of arms of Greece Adopted 1995 Escutcheon The Royal Arms of Greece on the Dexter and on the Sinister the coat of arms of the Miller family: Ermine, three boar heads erased and langued Azure with a fesse Gules between them. Orders aforementioned

== Bibliography ==
- Manners Begin at Breakfast: Modern etiquette for families (2019). ISBN 9780865653719

== Notes ==
Greek royalty
Titles in pretence
Preceded by Anne-Marie of Denmark	— TITULAR — Queen consort of Greece; 10 January 2023 – present Reason for succession failure: Monarchy abolished in 1973	Incumbent
