= Prince Alexander von Fürstenberg =

American businessman

Prince Alexander
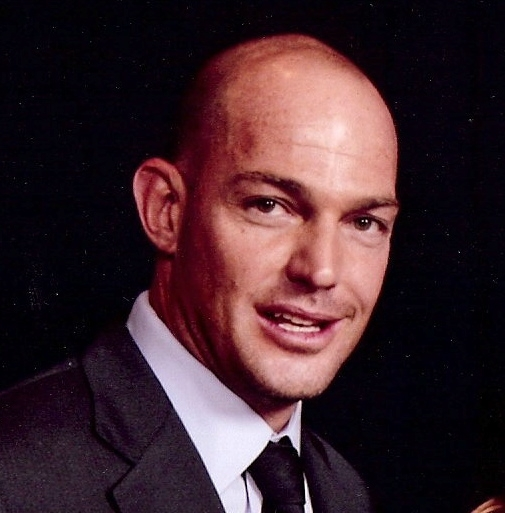
- 2008
- Born: Alexandre Egon Prinz zu Fürstenberg; January 25, 1970 (age 56); Malibu, California, U.S.
- Spouse: Alexandra Miller (m. 1995; div. 2002) Alison Parker Kay (m. 2020)
- Issue: Talita von Fürstenberg; Tassilo von Fürstenberg; Leon von Fürstenberg; Vito von Fürstenberg
- House: Fürstenberg
- Father: Prince Egon von Fürstenberg
- Mother: Diane Halfin
- Education: Brown University

Prince Alexander von Fürstenberg (born Alexandre Egon Prinz zu Fürstenberg; January 25, 1970) is an American businessman, socialite, and the son of fashion designers Diane von Fürstenberg and Prince Egon von Fürstenberg.

== Early life and education ==
Fürstenberg is the son of fashion designers Diane von Fürstenberg (née Halfin) and Prince Egon von Fürstenberg. His mother is from a Belgian Jewish family, from present-day Moldova and Greece; and his father was half German and half Italian, the son of the German Prince Tassilo zu Fürstenberg of the House of Fürstenberg and his Italian first wife, Clara Agnelli, the elder sister of the chairman of FIAT, Gianni Agnelli. His parents separated in 1972, and were divorced in 1983.

Due to his mother mainly living in France by the early 1980s, he and his sister were raised by his maternal grandmother, Liliane Nahmias Halfin.

Fürstenberg attended Brown University, where he earned a Bachelor of Arts degree in 1993.

== Work ==
Fürstenberg began his career in 1993 as a trader on the Risk Arbitrage Desk of Allen and Company. He is now the chief investment officer of Ranger Global Advisors, LLC, a family company he founded which focuses on opportunistic value-based investing. Previously, he was the co-managing member and chief investment officer of Arrow Capital Management, LLC, a private investment firm focused on global public equities. Since 2001, he has acted as Chief Investment Officer of Arrow Investments, Inc., a private investment office that serves the Diller-von Furstenberg family.

Fürstenberg led the restructuring of Diane von Fürstenberg Studio, LP, a global luxury lifestyle brand, taking it from $100 million in annual revenue to more than $200 million. He remains a partner and director in the company and also serves on the Board of Directors of IAC, a U.S.-based internet conglomerate.

== Personal life ==
As a teen, Fürstenberg lived in the Carlyle Hotel, two floors below duty-free shops owner Robert Warren Miller and his family; that is where he met Miller's youngest daughter Alexandra, who was three years his junior. Fürstenberg married Alexandra Miller on October 28, 1995 in a Catholic ceremony at the Church of St. Ignatius Loyola in New York City. They had two children, Talita Natasha (b. May 7, 1999) and Tassilo Egon Maximilian (b. August 26, 2001), who is named for his paternal great-grandfather. In 2002, they separated and were later divorced. He later announced his engagement to designer Alison "Ali" Kay, who gave birth to their son Leon in July 2012. Ali Kay gave birth to a second son Vito in June 2020 and on September 19, 2020, Kay's 36th birthday, the couple civilly married.

Despite hardly seeing his mother by the early 1980s, Alexander has stated that there was still affection between them, and that he became close to her again after returning to the United States in the 1990s.

== See also ==
- List of Greek Americans
