= Prince Egon von Fürstenberg =

Fashion designer (1946–2004)

Egon von Fürstenberg
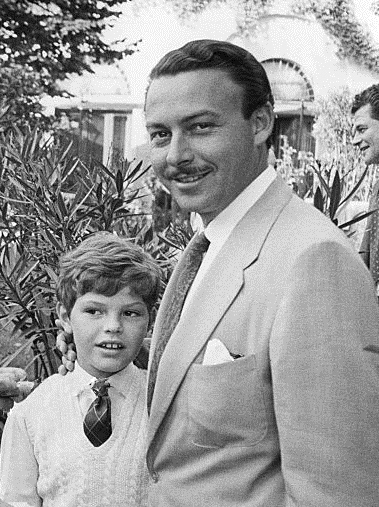
- Egon (left) in 1955 with his brother-in-law, Prince Alfonso of Hohenlohe-Langenburg
- Born: Eduard Egon Peter Paul Giovanni Prinz zu Fürstenberg; 29 June 1946; Lausanne, Switzerland
- Died: 11 June 2004 (aged 57); Rome, Italy
- Spouse: Diane Simone Michelle Halfin (m. 1969; div. 1983) Lynn Marshall (m. 1983) (separated)
- Issue: Alexander; Tatiana
- House: Fürstenberg
- Father: Prince Tassilo von Fürstenberg
- Mother: Clara Agnelli
- Religion: Roman Catholicism

Prince Egon von Fürstenberg (Eduard Egon Peter Paul Giovanni Prinz zu Fürstenberg; 29 June 1946 – 11 June 2004) was a socialite, banker, fashion and interior designer, and a member of the former German princely family of Fürstenberg.

In 1969, he married fashion designer Diane Halfin, with whom he had two children, Alexandre Egon (born 25 January 1970) and Tatiana Desirée (born 16 February 1971). The couple separated in 1973 and divorced in 1983. The same year, he married Lynn Marshall (born c. 1950), an American from Mississippi who was the co-owner of a flower shop; the couple remained childless. Between his marriages, Egon also had a male partner; he was frank about his bisexuality and the openness of his first marriage.

Fürstenberg wrote two books on fashion and interior design (The Power Look, 1978, and The Power Look at Home: Decorating for Men, 1980), as well as opening an interior design firm. He died in Rome on 11 June 2004.

== Family ==
Eduard Egon Peter Paul Giovanni Prinz zu Fürstenberg, born 29 June 1946 in Lausanne, Switzerland, was the elder son of Prince Tassilo zu Fürstenberg (1903–1989) and his first wife, Clara Agnelli (1920-2016), elder sister of Fiat's chairman Gianni Agnelli. After Clara's departure, his father married Texas oil heiress Cecil Amelia Hudson (née Blaffer).

Fürstenberg's younger brother is Prince Sebastian zu Fürstenberg, and his sister was socialite and actress Princess Ira zu Fürstenberg.

== Biography ==
Egon von Fürstenberg was born in Lausanne, Switzerland. He was baptized by the French nuncio Angelo Roncalli (later elected Pope John XXIII) and was brought up in great privilege in Venice, Italy. He earned a degree in economics from the University of Geneva, followed by a 14-month term on a peace mission in Burundi working as a teacher, and then two years as an investment banker in New York.

While studying at a university, he met 1965 fellow student Diane Simone Michelle Halfin, a Belgian-born Jewish woman of Romanian-Greek descent and daughter of a Holocaust survivor. They married on 16 July 1969, at Montfort-l'Amaury, Yvelines, France. The new Princess Diane von Fürstenberg was pregnant, and Egon's father, who objected to his son marrying a Jew, and other von Fürstenberg family members attended the wedding ceremony but boycotted the reception.

His wife opened her fashion house in New York at Egon's urging, creating an eventually iconic wrap dress, a career as designer that pre-dated and arguably eclipsed Egon's. Fürstenberg began his career as a buyer for Macy's, taking night classes at the Fashion Institute of Technology, and Parson's School of Design.

The von Fürstenbergs had two children: Alexandre Egon (born 25 January 1970) and Tatiana Desirée (born 16 February 1971). Despite still making public appearances together, Egon and Diane von Fürstenberg separated in 1972, and finally divorced in 1983. The same year, he married Lynn Marshall. However, at the time of his death in 2004, it was acknowledged that von Fürstenberg's marriage to Lynn foundered as well, and they were not immediately confirmed to still be married by this time.

Fürstenberg began independent work as a fashion designer in 1977, designing clothes for plus-size women, and later expanding to full fashion and product licensing, with ready-to-wear, fragrance, and made to measure lines based in Rome. Next von Furstenberg designed ready-made clothing for the masses, and an off-the-peg (ready-to-wear) line of fashion.

Fürstenberg wrote two top selling books: The Power Look (1978), a guide to fashion and good taste, and The Power Look at Home: Decorating for Men (1980), a book on home furnishings. He opened an interior design firm in 1981. In 1991, he exhibited at Alta Moda days in Rome.

Fürstenberg collected art, and his collection included works by Zachary Selig.

His high level of sexual activity resulted in Fürstenberg being nicknamed "Egon von First in bed."

Egon von Fürstenberg died at Spallanzani Hospital in Rome on 11 June 2004. The New York Post reported Fürstenberg's widow stating that he died of liver cancer caused by a hepatitis C infection that he acquired in the 1970s. However, it was acknowledged in the 2024 documentary Diane von Furstenberg: Woman in Charge that Egon von Fürstenberg had in fact been diagnosed with HIV in the 1980s. He left behind two children, and today (2026) he has five grandchildren.

== Published works ==
Fürstenberg's published works included:

- The Power Look, 1978, New York, NY: Holt, Rinehart, and Winston
- The Power Look at Home: Decorating for Men, 1980, New York, NY: Morrow
