= Diane von Fürstenberg =

Belgian fashion designer (born 1946)

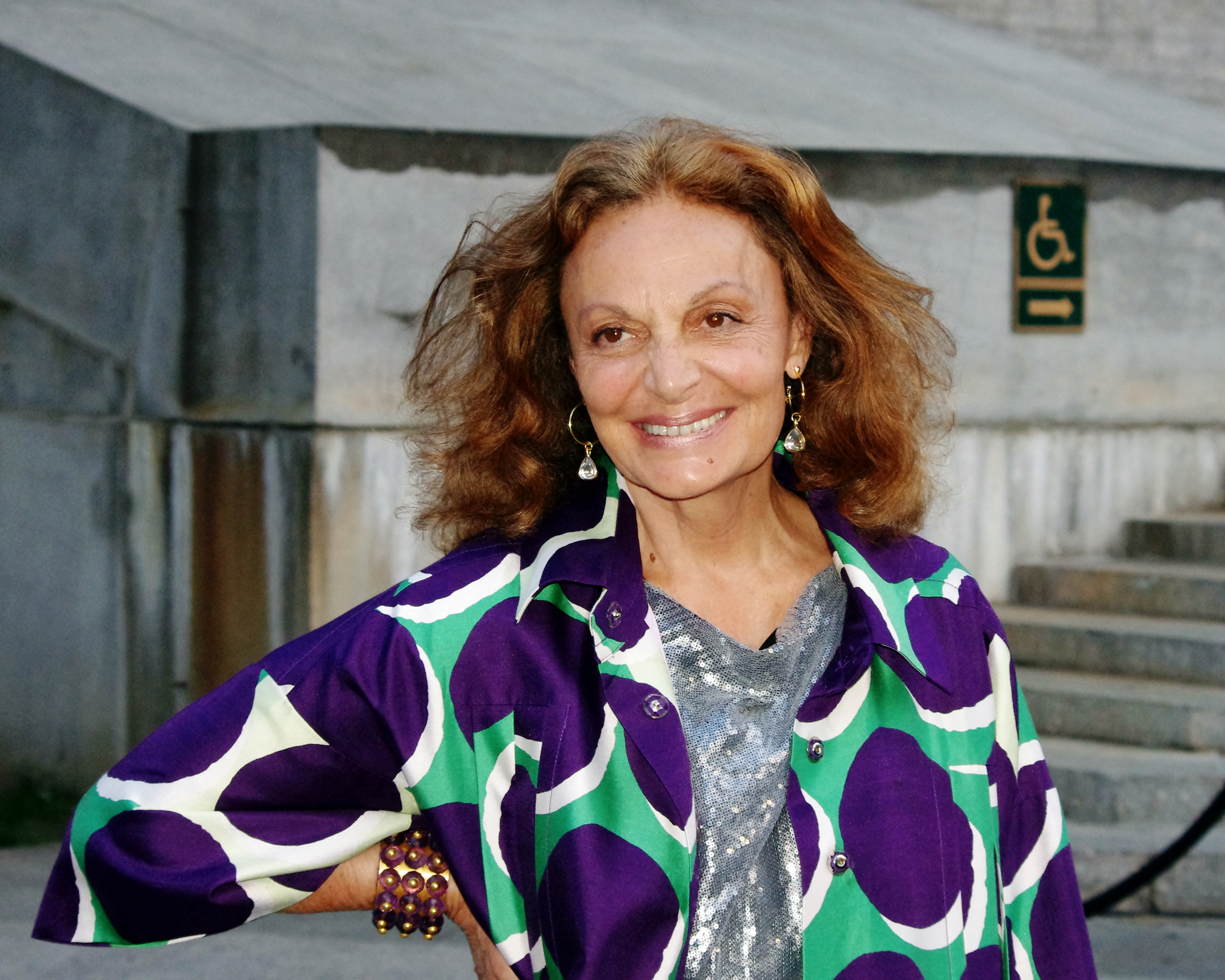
- von Fürstenberg in 2012
- Born: Diane Simone Michele Halfin; 31 December 1946 (age 79); Brussels, Belgium
- Occupation: Fashion designer
- Spouses: Prince Egon von Fürstenberg (m. 1969; div. 1983) Barry Diller (m. 2001)
- Children: Alexander; Tatiana
- Education: University of Geneva
- Website: www.dvf.com

Diane von Fürstenberg (born Diane Simone Michele Halfin; 31 December 1946) is a Belgian fashion designer best known for her wrap dress. She initially rose to prominence in 1969 when she married into the German princely House of Fürstenberg, as the wife of Prince Egon von Fürstenberg. Following their separation in 1972 and divorce in 1983, she has continued to use his family name.

Her fashion company, Diane von Furstenberg (DvF), is available in over 70 countries and 45 free-standing shops worldwide, with the company's headquarters and flagship boutique located in Manhattan's Meatpacking District.

She is the past chairwoman of the Council of Fashion Designers of America (CFDA), a position she held from 2006 to 2019; in 2014 was listed as the 68th most powerful woman in the world by Forbes; and in 2015 was included in the Time 100, as an icon, by Time magazine. In 2016, she was awarded an honorary doctorate from the New School. In 2019, she was inducted into the National Women's Hall of Fame.

== Early life ==
Diane Simone Michele Halfin was born in Brussels, Belgium, to Jewish parents. Her father, Bessarabian-born Leon (Lipa) Halfin, migrated to Belgium in 1929 from Chişinău, Kingdom of Romania (later Moldova) and later sought refuge from the Nazis in Switzerland. Her mother was Greek-born Liliane Nahmias, from Thessaloniki, a Holocaust survivor, who was captured by the Nazis while she was a member of the Resistance during World War II. Nahmias was taken to Auschwitz, then transferred to Ravensbrück, where she was liberated 20 months before Fürstenburg's birth. Weighing only 49 pounds, her mother was told by doctors that she should not have children, that she could die in childbirth, and that her baby would not be normal. Fürstenberg has spoken broadly about her mother's influence in her life, crediting her with teaching her that "fear is not an option."

Fürstenberg attended a boarding school in Oxfordshire. She studied at Complutense University of Madrid before transferring to the University of Geneva to study economics. She then moved to Paris and worked as an assistant to fashion photographer's agent Albert Koski. She left Paris for Italy to apprentice with the textile manufacturer Angelo Ferretti in his factory, where she learned about cut, color and fabric. It was here that she designed and produced her first silk jersey wrap tops and skirts as separates, and after seeing a customer wearing the pieces together, Fürstenberg converted the design to a one-piece dress.

== Early career ==
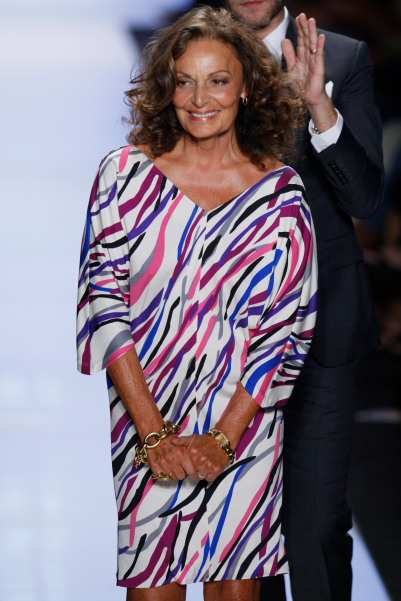
Von Fürstenberg at the 2008 New York Fashion Week

A year after marrying, Fürstenberg began designing women's clothes: "The minute I knew I was about to be Egon's wife, I decided to have a career. I wanted to be someone of my own, and not just a plain little girl who got married beyond her desserts." In her 2024 documentary, Fürstenberg stated that she sought to upstage her then in-laws, who were acknowledged to have disapproved of her Jewish background and, despite attending Diane and Egon's wedding ceremony, opted to boycott their wedding reception. After the Fürstenbergs separated in 1973, Egon also became a fashion designer. After moving to New York, she met high-profile Vogue editor Diana Vreeland, who declared her designs "absolutely smashing". She had her name listed on the fashion calendar for New York Fashion Week, and so her business was created. She moved into an estate in Connecticut she named Cloudwalk, and has lived there since.

In 1974, she introduced the knitted jersey "wrap dress", which became an iconic piece in women's fashion; it is included in the collection of the Costume Institute of the Metropolitan Museum of Art. Von Fürstenberg opted to first advertise the wrap dress in Women’s Wear Daily in 1974, and included the tag line: "Feel like a woman, wear a dress!" Soon after the launch, 25,000 dresses were selling each week; one million dresses had been sold by 1976, according to Forbes. Tailored during the 1970s women's liberation era, the wrap dress also managed to embody the shifting roles of women in society at the time and was regarded as a dress for a "woman in charge." After the success of the wrap dress, von Fürstenberg was featured on the cover of Newsweek magazine in 1976. The accompanying article declared her "the most marketable woman since Coco Chanel." She launched a cosmetic line and her first fragrance, "Tatiana", named after her daughter. The New York Times reported that by 1979 the annual retail sales for the company were $150 million (equivalent to $665 million in 2025).

Her fortunes would take a hit in the early 1980s. In 1985, von Fürstenberg moved to Paris, where she founded Salvy, a French-language publishing house. She started a number of other businesses, including a line of cosmetics and a home-shopping business, which she launched in 1991. In 1992, von Fürstenberg sold $1.2 million (equivalent to $2.8 million in 2025) of her Silk Assets collection in two hours on QVC. She credits the success with giving her the confidence to relaunch her company.

== Diane von Fürstenberg ==
Fürstenberg relaunched her company in 1997, and reintroduced the wrap dress, which gained popularity with a new generation of women. Initially, the relaunch was a failure but, with the appointment of Paula Sutter as president of the brand, it was seemingly restored to its earlier success in the mid-seventies.

Fürstenberg owned the company, Diane von Furstenberg Studio, along with Barry Diller and her two children from her first marriage, Alexandre and Tatiana. It lost money for its first three years, broke even in 2002, and turned its first profit in 2003.

In 2004, the brand introduced the DVF by H. Stern fine jewelry collection, and entered into a licensing agreement with Italian silk manufacturer Mantero for the production and distribution of a beach line and scarf collection. In 2008, DVF launched its first resort collection, new line of travel-oriented clothes.

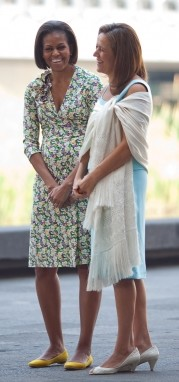
First Lady Michelle Obama wearing a Diane von Fürstenberg wrap dress

In 2009, Michelle Obama wore the DVF signature "Chain Link" print wrap dress on the official White House Christmas card.

In 2011, DVF introduced a home collection, and a signature fragrance, Diane.

In 2012, Fürstenberg launched her first children's collection with GapKids and a denim collaboration with Current/Elliott.

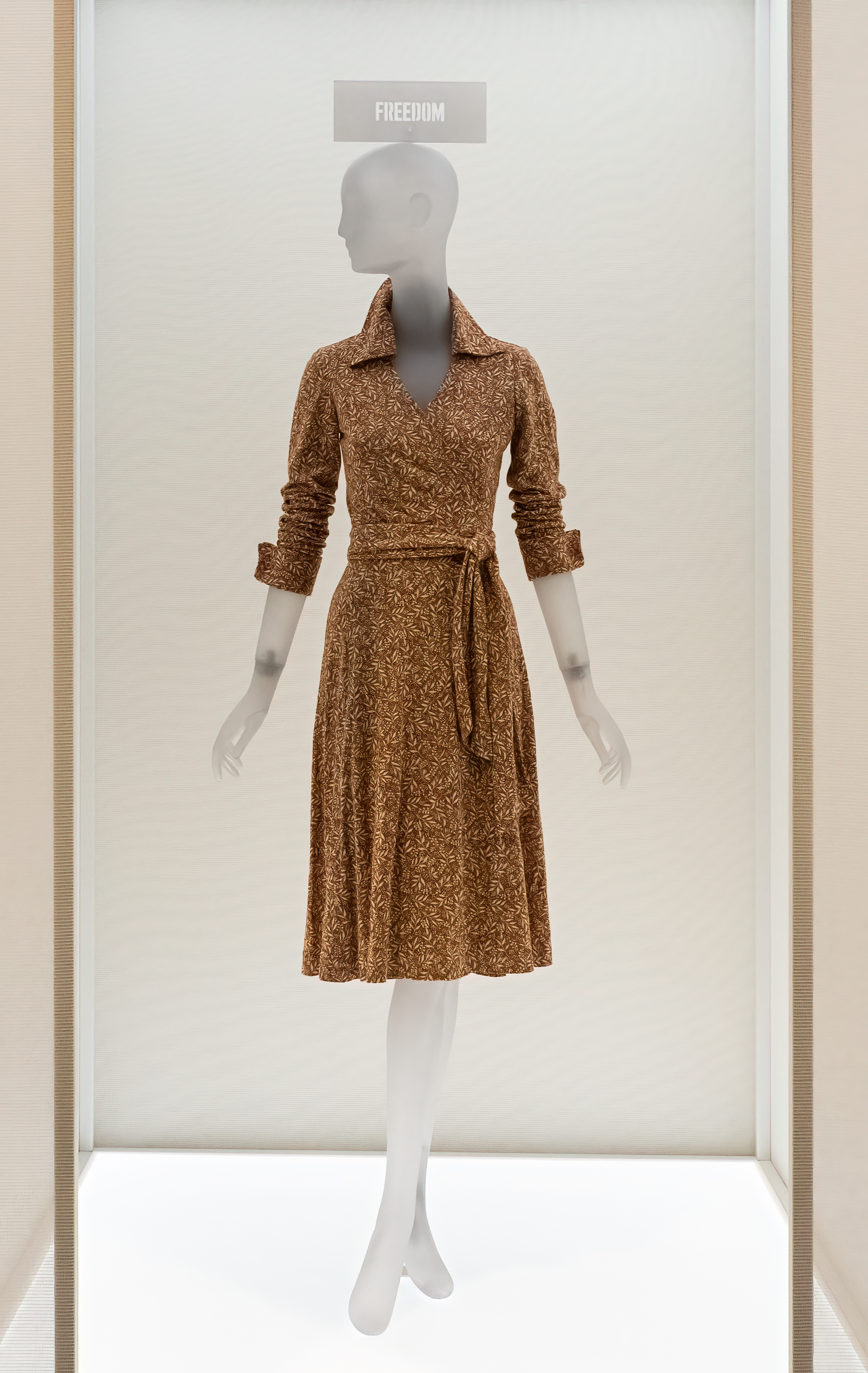
A dress von Fürstenberg designed in the 1970s was part of the Metropolitan Museum of Art exhibition In America: A Lexicon of Fashion.

Her clothes have been worn by celebrities including Catherine, Princess of Wales, Gwyneth Paltrow, Kate Beckinsale, Madonna, Tina Brown, Jessica Alba, Susan Sarandon, Priyanka Chopra, Jennifer Lopez and Whitney Houston. Google Glass made its New York Fashion Week debut at the designer's Spring 2013 fashion show.

In 2016, Scottish designer and print specialist Jonathan Saunders was appointed as the company’s first chief creative officer. His collections were well received by buyers and press, but he departed within 18 months, after reportedly clashing with Fürstenberg.

Between 2017 and 2019, the DVF brand lost nearly $80 million, leading to an eventual 75% of the workforce made redundant in the U.S in May 2020. By 2018, sales, which had been $300 million before the 2008 recession, were down to $150 million.

In 2018, the brand banned mohair use after a PETA exposé showed workers mutilating and killing goats to obtain it. All fur, angora and exotic skins were also banned from future collections.

In June 2020, DVF announced the pending closure 18 of its 19 U.S. stores, after laying off 300 of their 400 employees in May 2020. That same year, the company's UK division entered administration due to restrictions caused by the COVID-19 pandemic.

From 2020 to 2025, DVF’s global operations, including design, production, marketing and distribution, were managed by Glamel Trading Limited in Hong Kong. Throughout the licensing arrangement, Fürstenberg herself had approval rights over the design of her namesake products.

=== Creative directors ===
- 2001–2010: Nathan Jenden
- 2011–2012: Yvan Mispelaere
- 2014–2016: Michael Herz
- 2016–2017: Jonathan Saunders
- 2018: Nathan Jenden
- 2026–present: Henry Zankov

== Other activities ==
=== Council of Fashion Designers of America ===
From 2006 to 2019, Fürstenberg served as president of the Council of Fashion Designers of America (CFDA).

=== Philanthropy ===
Fürstenberg is a director of the Diller – von Furstenberg Family Foundation, which provides support to nonprofit organizations in the areas of community building, education, human rights, arts, health and the environment. In 2010, the foundation created The DVF Awards, presented annually to four women who display leadership, strength and courage in their commitment to women's causes. In 2011, the foundation made a $20 million commitment to the High Line.

Fürstenberg sits on the board of Vital Voices, a women's leadership organization, and served as one of the project chairs for New York City Mayor Michael Bloomberg's review of the future of NYC's Fashion industry, prepared by New York City Economic Development Corporation.

=== Political activism ===
In 2009, Fürstenberg signed a petition in support of film director Roman Polanski, calling for his release after Polanski was arrested in Switzerland in relation to his 1977 sexual abuse case.

In 2014, Fürstenberg joined the Ban Bossy campaign as a spokesperson advocating leadership roles for girls.

In 2016, Fürstenberg designed shirts for Hillary Clinton's presidential campaign.

In 2019, Fürstenberg launched the #InCharge podcast, on Spotify, with the goal of empowerment for women. Podcast guests include Kris Jenner, Elaine Welteroth, Karlie Kloss, Priyanka Chopra, Martine Rothblatt, Teo Wan Lin, among others.

== In popular culture ==
In 1998, Fürstenberg published her business memoir, Diane: A Signature Life. She later released a second memoir, The Women I Wanted to Be, an autobiography which delved into her personal life and upbringing.

In 2009, a large-scale retrospective exhibition entitled "Diane von Furstenberg: Journey of a Dress" opened at the Manezh, one of Moscow's largest public exhibition spaces. Curated by Andre Leon Talley, it attracted media attention. In 2010, the exhibition traveled to São Paulo; and in 2011, to the Pace Gallery in Beijing.

In 2014, Ovation TV featured The Fashion Fund, a documentary about the CFDA/Vogue Fashion Fund competition. Fürstenberg starred alongside Anna Wintour in the program.

In November 2014, the E! network started airing the first season of reality show House of DVF. Contestants on the show performed various tasks and challenges in the hopes of becoming a global brand ambassador for Fürstenberg. In September 2015, it returned for a second (final) season.

In 2024, Disney+ released Diane von Furstenberg: Woman in Charge a feature-length biographical documentary of von Furstenberg's life and business. The documentary features interviews with Oprah, Hillary Clinton, Marc Jacobs and other notable artists and designers. The documentary received positive reviews.

In 2024, she released her documentary, Diane von Fürstenberg: Woman in Charge.

== Personal life ==
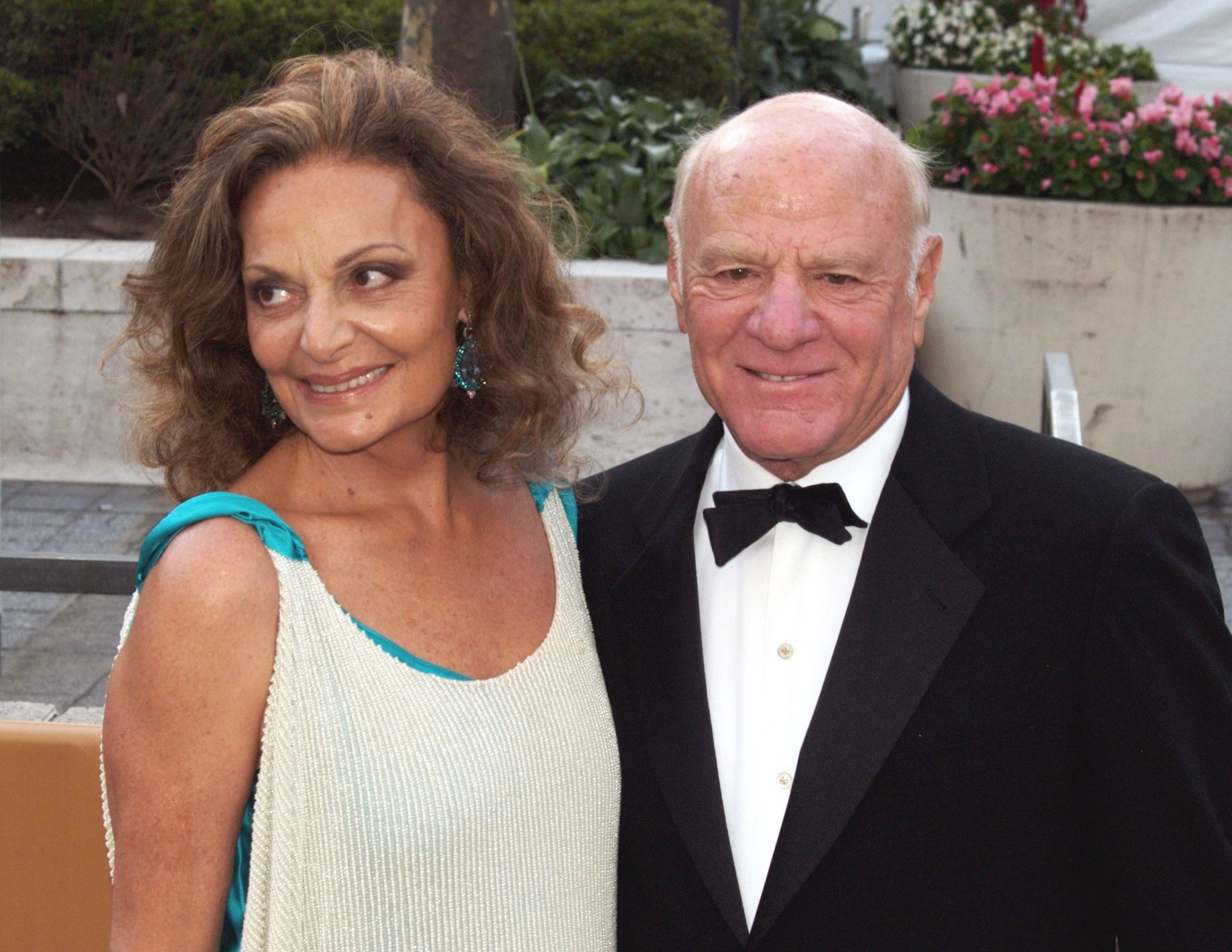
Von Fürstenberg with her second husband Barry Diller at the 2009 Metropolitan Opera premiere

At university, when she was 18, she met Prince Egon von Fürstenberg, the elder son of Prince Tassilo zu Fürstenberg, a German Roman Catholic prince, and his first wife, Clara Agnelli, an heiress to the Fiat automotive fortune and member of the Italian nobility. Married in 1969, the couple had two children, Alexander and Tatiana. She is grandmother of five, including Talita von Fürstenberg.

The von Fürstenbergs' marriage, although unpopular with the groom's family because of her Jewish ethnicity, was considered dynastic, and on her marriage she became 'Her Serene Highness Princess Diane of Fürstenberg'. She lost any claim to the title following their separation in 1972 and divorce in 1983.

In 2001, she married American media mogul Barry Diller.

On 28 February 2020, von Fürstenberg was made a Chevalier de la Légion d'honneur for her contributions to fashion, women's leadership, and philanthropy. She was presented the award by Christine Lagarde, president of the European Central Bank, in a ceremony at the Ministry of Europe and Foreign Affairs headquarters on the Quai d'Orsay.

Details of her ancestry were included in the episode "Fashion's Roots" (season 6, 13 October 2020), of the PBS series Finding Your Roots.

Fürstenberg owns the super-yacht Eos with her husband. It features a figurehead of von Fürstenberg sculpted by artist Anh Duong. She reportedly swims in the sea every morning for two hours, and hikes in the afternoons. She has travelled the world and claims to be "the world's lightest packer and always ready to go".

== Awards and honors ==
- 2008: Star on Seventh Avenue's Fashion Walk of Fame
- 2010: Gold Medal at the annual Queen Sofía Spanish Institute Gold Medal Gala
- 2010: Andre Leon Talley Lifetime Achievement Award, given by the Savannah College of Art and Design
- 2024: Cinema for Peace Honorary Award
- 2025: World Economic Forum Crystal Award

== Published works ==
- Furstenberg, Diane von (1976). Diane Von Furstenberg's Book of Beauty: How to Become a More Attractive, Confident, and Sensual Woman. Simon & Schuster. ISBN 978-0671219048.
- Furstenberg, Diane von (1998). Diane: A Signature Life. Simon & Schuster. ISBN 978-0684843834.
- Furstenberg, Diane von (2014). The Woman I Wanted to Be. Simon & Schuster. ISBN 978-1451651546.
- Furstenberg, Diane von (2021). Own It: The Secret to Life. Phaidon Press. ISBN 978-1838662325.
