= Bowes-Lyon family =

Scottish noble family

Bowes-Lyon
- Noble family
- Parent house: Clan Lyon
- Country: United Kingdom: Scotland; England
- Founder: John Lyon and Mary Bowes
- Current head: Simon Bowes-Lyon
- Titles: Queen consort of the United Kingdom; Earl of Strathmore and Kinghorne; Lord of Glamis; Princess of Denmark
- Members: Queen Elizabeth the Queen Mother; Princess Anne of Denmark
- Connected families: British royal family; Danish royal family
- Motto: "In Thee, O Lord, have I put my trust"; (Latin: In Te Domine Speravi)
- Estates: Glamis Castle (seat); Streatlam Castle; Gibside

The Bowes-Lyon family is a Scottish noble family which descends from George Bowes of Gibside and Streatlam Castle (1701–1760), a County Durham landowner and politician, through John Bowes, 9th Earl of Strathmore and Kinghorne, chief of the Clan Lyon. Following the marriage in 1767 of the 9th Earl (John Lyon) to rich heiress Mary Eleanor Bowes, the family name was changed to Bowes by Act of Parliament. The 10th Earl changed the name to Lyon-Bowes and the 13th Earl, Claude, changed the order to Bowes-Lyon. Their family seat is Glamis Castle.

Notable members of the family include:

- Mary Bowes, Countess of Strathmore and Kinghorne (1749–1800), known as "The Unhappy Countess", was an 18th-century British heiress, notorious for her licentious lifestyle, who was married at one time to the 9th Earl of Strathmore and Kinghorne.
- Claude Bowes-Lyon, 14th Earl of Strathmore and Kinghorne, (1855–1944) was a landowner, and the father of Queen Elizabeth the Queen Mother.
- Patrick Bowes-Lyon (1863–1946), younger brother of the 14th Earl, winner of the 1887 Wimbledon doubles.
- Fergus Bowes-Lyon (1889–1915) noted golfer killed in the First World War, brother of Queen Elizabeth the Queen Mother.
- Queen Elizabeth the Queen Mother (born Elizabeth Bowes-Lyon; 1900–2002), Queen of the United Kingdom as the wife of King George VI, and mother of Queen Elizabeth II.
- Princess Anne of Denmark, born Anne Ferelith Fenella Bowes-Lyon (1917–80), was the mother of royal photographer Patrick Anson, 5th Earl of Lichfield, and a first cousin of Queen Elizabeth II. She became a princess of Denmark by her second marriage to Prince Georg of Denmark, a great-grandson of King Christian IX of Denmark, in 1950.
- Nerissa and Katherine Bowes-Lyon were the third and fifth daughters of John Bowes-Lyon, the Queen Mother's brother, and his wife, Fenella Bowes-Lyon. In 1941, when Katherine was 15 years old and Nerissa was 22, they were sent from the family home in Scotland to Royal Earlswood Hospital at Redhill, Surrey, to live out their lives.
- Michael Bowes-Lyon, 18th Earl of Strathmore and Kinghorne (1957–2016).
- Charles David Bowes-Lyon, eco-entrepreneur (born July 1989); 05 April 2018 founded Climate Cups Ltd; 24 December 2018 co-founded Wild Cosmetics Ltd with childhood friend Freddy Ward.

== Related places ==
- The Bowes Museum, a purpose-built public art gallery for John Bowes and his wife Joséphine Chevalier, Countess of Montalbo, has a nationally renowned art collection and is situated in the town of Barnard Castle, Teesdale, County Durham, England.
- Gibside, a country estate, set amongst the peaks and slopes of the Derwent Valley, near Rowlands Gill, Tyne and Wear, North East England, which was previously owned by the Bowes-Lyon family and is now a National Trust property.
- Glamis Castle, situated beside the village of Glamis in Angus, Scotland, is the home of the Earl and Countess of Strathmore and Kinghorne, and is open to the public.
- St Paul's Walden Bury is a stately home and surrounding gardens of the Bowes-Lyon family located in the village of St Paul's Walden in Hertfordshire, best known for its connection to Queen Elizabeth the Queen Mother.
- Streatlam Castle, a Baroque stately home owned by the Bowes-Lyon family, located near the town of Barnard Castle in County Durham, England. It proved too expensive to maintain, and so was blown up with dynamite in 1959.

== Other ==
- Earl of Strathmore and Kinghorne, created in the Peerage of Scotland in 1606 for Patrick Lyon.
- Monster of Glamis, allegedly a surviving deformed member of the Bowes-Lyon family, born in 1821 and kept in seclusion in Glamis Castle.
