= Lady Elizabeth Shakerley =

British party planner and socialite

Lady Elizabeth Shakerley CVO
- Shakerley in 2018
- Born: Elizabeth Georgiana Anson; 7 June 1941; Windsor Castle, Windsor, Berkshire, United Kingdom
- Died: 1 November 2020 (aged 79); London, United Kingdom
- Spouse: Sir Geoffrey Shakerley, 6th Bt (m. 1972; div. 2009)
- Children: Fiona Burrows
- Parents: Thomas Anson, Viscount Anson (father); Anne Bowes-Lyon (mother)

Lady Elizabeth Georgiana Shakerley (Note: Per a Royal Warrant of Precedence of 12 July 1961, Shakerley was entitled to the title, rank, place, pre-eminence and precedence of the daughter of an Earl as if her father had succeeded.) CVO (née Anson; 7 June 1941 – 1 November 2020) was a British party planner, writer and socialite from the Anson family. She was a first cousin once removed of Queen Elizabeth II and sister of Patrick Anson, 5th Earl of Lichfield.

== Early life ==
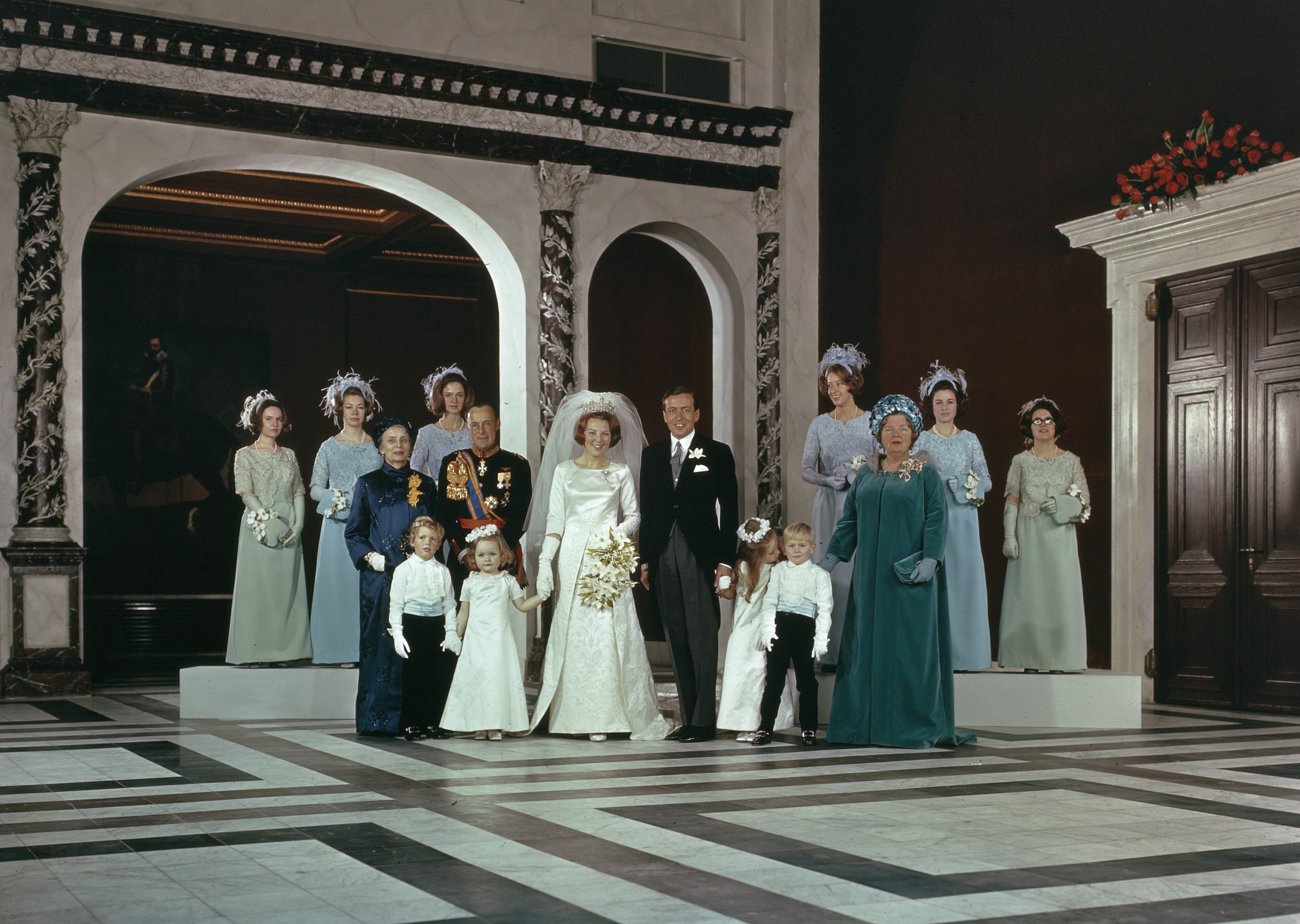
Shakerley, back row second from right, as a bridesmaid at the wedding of Princess Beatrix of the Netherlands and Claus van Amsberg in Amsterdam, 10 March 1966

The Honourable Elizabeth Georgiana Anson was born on 7 June 1941 at Windsor Castle to Thomas Anson, Viscount Anson (1913–1958), and Anne Bowes-Lyon. Her mother was a niece of Queen Elizabeth (later the Queen Mother). King George VI was her godfather. She was the niece of Nerissa and Katherine Bowes-Lyon.

She was educated at Downham School, Essex. In 1960, her paternal grandfather, the 4th Earl of Lichfield, died and her brother, Patrick, inherited the title and family seat, Shugborough Hall near Great Haywood, Staffordshire. Despite the estate's passing to the National Trust in lieu of death duties, Lord Lichfield maintained an apartment for himself and his sister.

Her parents divorced in 1948. Subsequently, her mother married Prince Georg of Denmark and moved to Paris where Prince Georg served as military, naval and air attaché. Her father died in 1958 before acceding to the earldom of Lichfield. On 12 July 1961, Queen Elizabeth II issued a Royal Warrant of Precedence granting her the title, rank, place, pre-eminence and precedence of the daughter of an Earl as if her father had succeeded. Thus, she became known as The Lady Elizabeth Anson.

In 1966, she was a bridesmaid at the wedding of Princess Beatrix of the Netherlands and Claus van Amsberg.

== Career ==
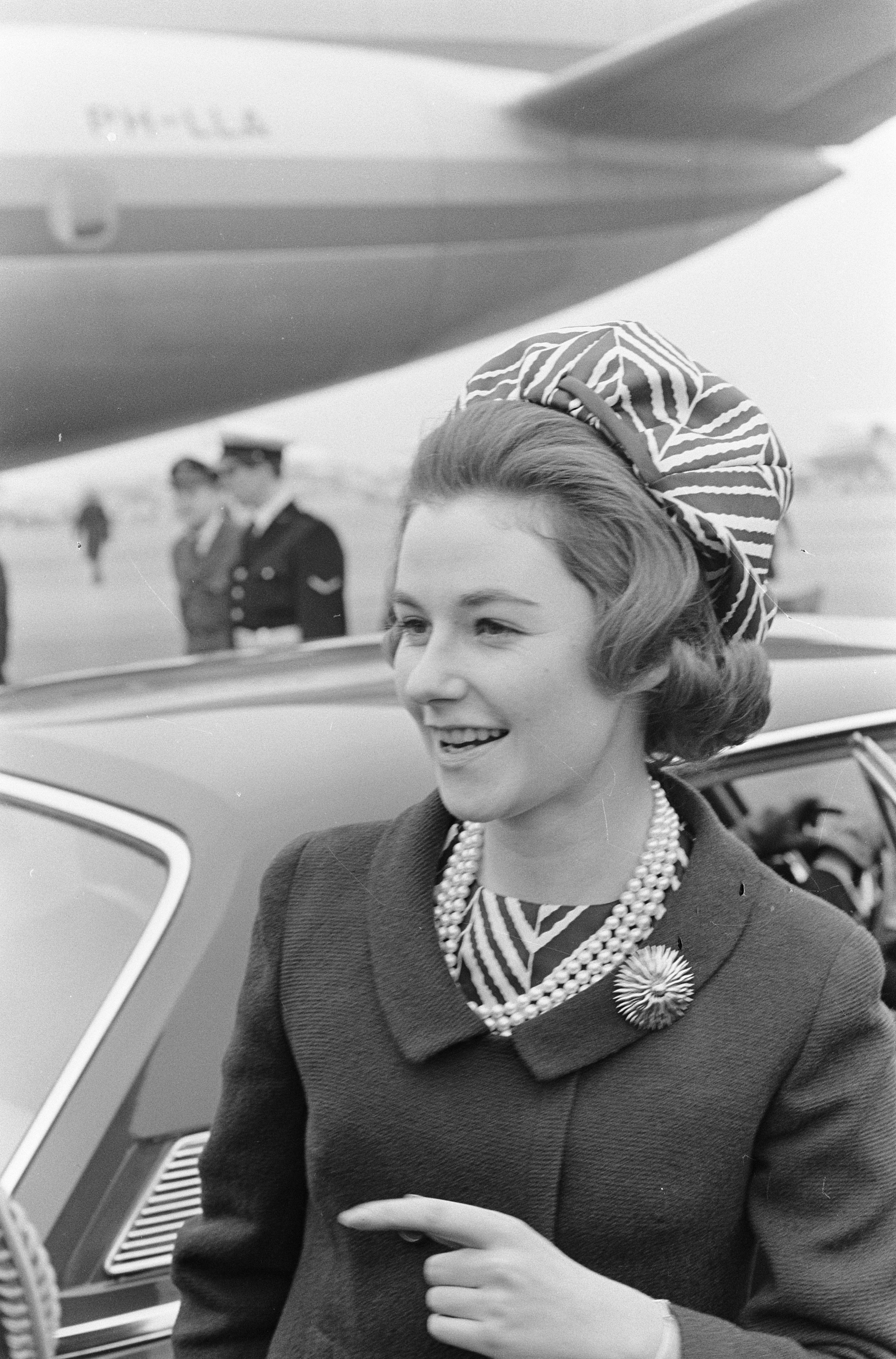
Shakerley at Amsterdam Airport Schiphol in 1966

Following the stress of planning her own debutante ball in 1959, Lady Elizabeth founded the firm Party Planners in 1960. From then on she planned parties for her cousin Queen Elizabeth II. Even after her marriage, she continued to be known as Elizabeth Anson professionally. In 1986, Shakerley published Lady Elizabeth Anson's Party Planners Book. In 1993, she notably organised a 50th birthday party for Ivana Trump's then fiancé, Riccardo Mazzucelli, but later sued Trump for not receiving £6,500 of a £36,500 dinner bill. The courts eventually ruled in favour of Trump.

Notable events she planned include: Sting's 1992 wedding to Trudie Styler; Margaret Thatcher's 70th birthday party in 1995; Queen Elizabeth II's 80th and 90th birthday parties in 2006 and 2016, respectively; Crown Prince Pavlos of Greece's 1995 wedding to Marie-Chantal Miller; and a reception for foreign royal guests the night before the Prince William's 2011 wedding to Catherine Middleton. In 2000, she planned three consecutive events for the royal family; Prince William's 18th birthday on 21 June, Princess Anne's 50th birthday on 15 August and Princess Margaret's 70th birthday on 21 August.

As the stepdaughter of a Danish prince, Shakerley also attended many royal events in continental Europe, including the birthday celebrations of the King Harald V of Norway (her stepfather's first cousin) and the funeral of Jean, Grand Duke of Luxembourg. In 2018, Shakerley attended a state banquet given by Queen Elizabeth II in honour of the King and Queen of the Netherlands at Buckingham Palace.

== Personal life and death ==
On 27 July 1972, Shakerley married Sir Geoffrey Shakerley, 6th Bt, at Westminster Abbey. Guests at the wedding included Queen Elizabeth II, Queen Elizabeth the Queen Mother and Princess Beatrix of the Netherlands. Her second cousins Princess Anne and Lady Sarah Armstrong-Jones were among her bridesmaids. Lady Elizabeth and Shakerley separated in 1986 and divorced in 2009. They had one daughter and two grandchildren:

- Fiona Elizabeth Fenella Shakerley (born 18 August 1973); she married at Lichfield Cathedral on 22 May 2004, Edward Brocas Burrows (born 1975), grandson of Montagu Brocas Burrows. They have two children:
  - Noah Burrows (born 1 March 2006)
  - Ruby Burrows (born 2 November 2008)

Shakerley suffered from chronic fatigue syndrome. She died of emphysema in hospital in London on 1 November 2020 at the age of 79.

A memorial service was held on 23 June 2022 at St Margaret's Church, Westminster. The Countess of Wessex (representing Queen Elizabeth II), Princess Beatrix of the Netherlands and Sheikh Hamad bin Khalifa Al Thani of Qatar attended. She was eulogized by Dame Joanna Lumley.

== Honours ==
- (United Kingdom) 31 March 2020: Commander of the Royal Victorian Order (CVO)
- (Netherlands) 10 March 1966: Recipient of the Wedding Medal of Princess Beatrix and Claus van Amsberg

== Ancestry ==
Ancestors of Lady Elizabeth Shakerley

8. Thomas Anson, 3rd Earl of Lichfield
4. Thomas Anson, 4th Earl of Lichfield
9. Lady Mildred Coke
2. Thomas Anson, Viscount Anson
10. Lt. Col. Edward George Keppel
5. Evelyn Maud Keppel
11. Mary King
1. Lady Elizabeth Shakerley
12. Claude Bowes-Lyon, 14th Earl of Strathmore and Kinghorne
6. The Hon. John Bowes-Lyon
13. Cecilia Cavendish-Bentinck
3. Anne Bowes-Lyon
14. Charles Hepburn-Stuart-Forbes-Trefusis, 21st Baron Clinton
7. The Hon. Fenella Hepburn-Stuart-Forbes-Trefusis
15. Lady Jane Grey McDonnell

== Bibliography ==
- Lady Elizabeth Anson's Party Planners Book: The Complete Guide to Entertaining Stylishly and Successfully. London: Weidenfeld & Nicolson, 1986. Hardcover: ISBN 9780297788546.
