= John Bowes-Lyon =

British noble (1886–1930)

The Honourable John Bowes-Lyon DL

Deputy lieutenant of Forfarshire
- In office 1920–1921

Personal details
- Born: John Herbert Bowes-Lyon; 1 April 1886
- Died: 7 February 1930 (aged 43) Glamis Castle, Angus, Scotland
- Resting place: St Paul's Walden Bury, Hertfordshire, England
- Spouse: Fenella Hepburn-Stuart-Forbes-Trefusis (m. 1914)
- Children: 5, incl. Princess Anne of Denmark, Nerissa and Katherine Bowes-Lyon
- Parents: Claude Bowes-Lyon, 14th Earl of Strathmore and Kinghorne (father); Cecilia Cavendish-Bentinck (mother)
- Education: Eton College
- Alma mater: New College, Oxford
- Occupation: Stockbroker at Rowe & Pitman
- Cricket career

Cricket information
- Bowling: fast-medium

Domestic team information
- Years: Team
- 1906–1907: Oxford University
- Military career
- Branch: British Army
- Service years: 1915–1918
- Units: Black Watch; Territorial Army

John Herbert Bowes-Lyon (1 April 1886 – 7 February 1930) was the second son of the 14th Earl of Strathmore and Kinghorne and the Countess of Strathmore and Kinghorne, and the brother of Elizabeth Bowes-Lyon, the future Queen Elizabeth the Queen Mother. He was the uncle of Queen Elizabeth II, although he died when she was a small child and before her sister Princess Margaret was born.

== Early life ==
John Bowes-Lyon was educated at Eton and New College, Oxford, where he played first-class cricket for the university side in three matches in 1906 and 1907, playing as a fast-medium bowler.

== Marriage and children ==
On 29 September 1914, Bowes-Lyon married Fenella Hepburn-Stuart-Forbes-Trefusis (19 August 1889 – 19 July 1966), the younger daughter of Charles Hepburn-Stuart-Forbes-Trefusis, 21st Baron Clinton. They had five daughters:

- Patricia Bowes-Lyon (6 July 1916 – 18 June 1917) died in infancy
- Anne Ferelith Fenella Bowes-Lyon (4 December 1917 – 26 September 1980) married, on 28 April 1938, Lt.-Col. Thomas William Arnold Anson, Viscount Anson (4 May 1913 – 8 March 1958), son of the fourth Earl of Lichfield; they were divorced in 1948. They had two children. Anne remarried Prince Georg of Denmark (16 April 1920 – 29 September 1986) on 16 September 1950.
  - Lady Elizabeth Shakerley, née Elizabeth Georgiana Anson
  - Patrick Anson, 5th Earl of Lichfield
- Nerissa Jane Irene Bowes-Lyon (18 February 1919 – 22 January 1986)
- Diana Cinderella Mildred Bowes-Lyon (14 December 1923 – 20 May 1986) married Peter Gordon Colin Somervell (5 May 1910 – 14 October 1993) on 24 February 1960. They had one daughter:
  - Katherine Somervell (23 August 1961) is a god-daughter of Queen Elizabeth II. She married Robert W. P. Lagneau in 1991.
- Katherine Juliet Bowes-Lyon (4 July 1926 – 23 February 2014).

== World War I ==
Before the outbreak of World War I, Bowes-Lyon worked as a stockbroker in the City of London for the firm Rowe and Pitman. In 1915, he was posted with the Black Watch. Just prior to the Battle of Aubers Ridge in that year, he accidentally shot himself in his left forefinger; it was amputated the following day. While receiving treatment in the UK, he admitted having experienced a nervous breakdown in 1912 and also suffered from neurasthenia. Late that year, he was posted to the Ministry of Munitions and then in the Territorial Army in 1916. After the war, he was twice threatened with courts-martial after having failed to show on parade for demobilisation. He later returned to his job in the city. On 19 June 1920, he was appointed a deputy lieutenant of Forfarshire.

== Death ==
Bowes-Lyon died at the family home of Glamis Castle just after midnight on the morning of 7 February 1930 of pneumonia, aged 43, leaving his widow to care for their four young children. (Two of them, Nerissa and Katherine, were severely mentally disabled.) Three days later he was buried at St Paul's Walden Bury.

Bowes-Lyon's widow, Fenella Trefusis, was a leading guest at the 1947 wedding of Princess Elizabeth and Philip Mountbatten. She outlived him by thirty-six years and died on 19 July 1966, aged 76.
