= Stagenhoe =

Stately home in Hertfordshire, England

Coordinates: 51°53′27″N 0°16′45″W

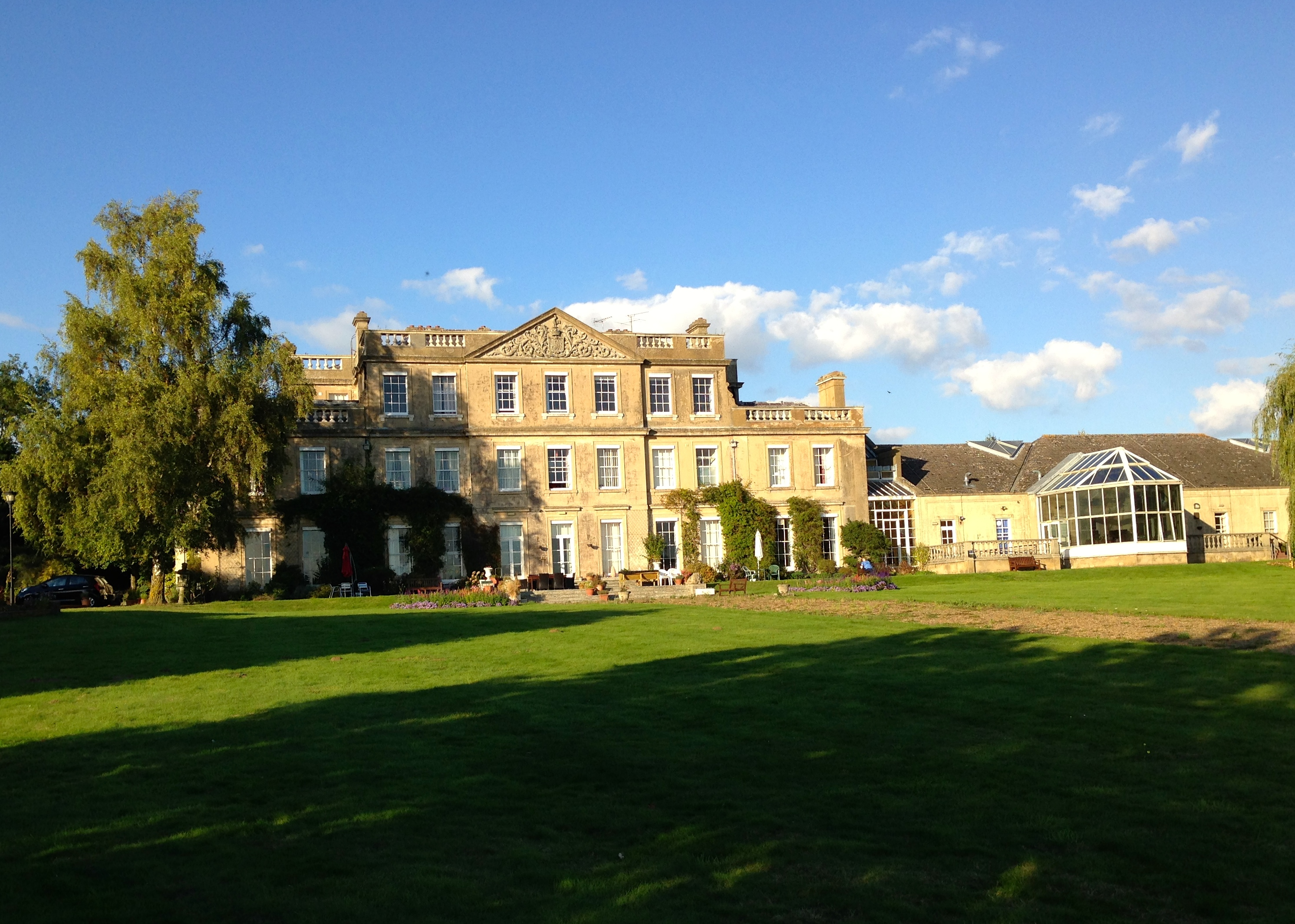
Stagenhoe is an 18th-century stately home now used as a Sue Ryder Care home

Stagenhoe is a Grade II listed stately home and surrounding gardens located in the village of St Paul's Walden in Hertfordshire. It is approximately 6 miles (10 km) south of Hitchin. It was the family seat of the Earl of Caithness. Socialite Lady Euphemia Sinclair spent her childhood there and became a friend of Queen Elizabeth the Queen Mother, whose family were neighbours.

It is one of two large manors with fine grounds in the village, the other being the historic home of the Bowes-Lyon family, St Paul's Walden Bury.

== History ==
Records about the manor of Stagenhoe date back to before the Norman Conquest of 1066, when it was one 'hide' (approximately 120 acres).

In 1595 (37th Eliz.), the manor of Stagenhoe was conveyed to William Hale, of King's Walden. His seventh son and eleventh child, John Hale, was knighted in 1660, built Stagenhoe Manor House about that time, was sheriff of the county in 1663, and died in 1672. Dame Elizabeth was the wife of this John Hale, and died one year after him. They were the last of the Hales of Stagenhoe; their daughter, Rose, who died 1695, carried the property to Sir John Austen, of Hall Place, Bexley, he died 1689. His son, Sir Robert Austen (died 1706) sold it to the Heyshams.

The house of 1650 or 1660 was burnt in 1737, and a new house was built by Mr. G. T. Heysham, about 1740. In 1703, the manor and surrounding park was sold to Robert Heynsham, a Member of parliament and it remained within his family until 1833. In about 1869, it was sold to another parliamentarian James Sinclair, 14th Earl of Caithness.

=== The House ===
The current manor was built in the 18th century, after a fire in about 1737. It has many 19th-century and later additions, including extensions to the rear and a porch on the west side. The main feature is the stuccoed south facade. The property was listed in 1968.

From the mid 1930s until about 1964, the house was a private preparatory school under the headmastership of Mr Paul Griffiths. He started the school and under his aegis, the school finally and fortunately became bankrupt and closed.

Having passed out of private hands, the house is much altered internally. It is now used as a Brainkind neurological centre. The grounds contain a registered campsite with five caravan pitches.
