= List of princesses of Denmark by marriage =

This is a list of Danish princesses by marriage since the establishment of hereditary monarchy by Frederick III in 1648. Individuals holding the title of princess would usually also be styled "Her Royal Highness" (HRH) or "Her Highness" (HH).

Elizabeth II, Queen of the United Kingdom, Marina Karella and Irina Aleksandrovna Ovtchinnikova, while meeting most of the requirements, are not classified as princesses by marriage of Greece and Denmark, because Prince Philip, husband of Elizabeth II, renounced his Greek (and Danish) titles, Prince Michael had a morganatic marriage, and Prince Peter lost his succession rights upon his marriage.

== List of princesses of Denmark by marriage since 1648 ==
Also a Danish princess by birth
Lost title due to divorce and subsequent remarriage

Portrait	Princess	Arms	Birth	Death	Marriage	Spouse
	Landgravine Charlotte Amalie of Hesse-Kassel		1650	1714	1667	Crown Prince Christian
	Anne, Queen of Great Britain		1665	1714	1683	Prince George
	Duchess Louise of Mecklenburg-Güstrow		1667	1721	1695	Crown Prince Frederick
	Margravine Sophie Magdalene of Brandenburg-Kulmbach		1700	1770	1721	Crown Prince Christian
	Princess Louise of Great Britain		1724	1751	1743	Crown Prince Frederick
	Duchess Sophia Frederica of Mecklenburg-Schwerin		1758	1794	1774	Hereditary Prince Frederick
	Landgravine Marie of Hesse-Kassel		1767	1852	1790	Crown Prince Frederick
	Duchess Charlotte Frederica of Mecklenburg-Schwerin		1784	1840	1806	Hereditary Prince Christian
	Princess Caroline Amalie of Schleswig-Holstein-Sonderburg-Augustenburg		1796	1881	1815	Hereditary Prince Christian
	Princess Caroline of Denmark		1793	1881	1829	Hereditary Prince Ferdinand
	Princess Vilhelmine Marie of Denmark		1808	1891	1828	Prince Frederick
	Duchess Caroline Mariane of Mecklenburg		1821	1876	1841	Crown Prince Frederick
	Princess Louise of Sweden and Norway		1851	1926	1869	Crown Prince Frederick
	Grand Duchess Olga Constantinovna of Russia		1851	1926	1867	George I, King of the Hellenes
	Princess Marie of Orléans		1865	1909	1885	Prince Valdemar
	Duchess Alexandrine of Mecklenburg-Schwerin		1879	1952	1898	Prince Christian
	Princess Maud of Wales		1869	1938	1896	Prince Carl
	Princess Helena Adelaide of Schleswig-Holstein-Sonderburg-Glücksburg		1888	1962	1909	Prince Harald
	Princess Sophia of Prussia		1870	1932	1889	Constantine, Crown Prince of Greece
	Princess Marie Bonaparte		1882	1962	1907	Prince George
	Grand Duchess Elena Vladimirovna of Russia		1882	1957	1902	Prince Nicholas
	Princess Alice of Battenberg		1885	1969	1903	Prince Andrew
	Nancy Leeds		1878	1923	1920	Prince Christopher
	Princess Françoise of Orléans		1902	1953	1929	Prince Christopher
	Princess Margaretha of Sweden		1899	1977	1919	Prince Axel of Denmark
	Princess Ingrid of Sweden		1910	2000	1935	Crown Prince Frederick
	Princess Caroline-Mathilde of Denmark		1912	1995	1933	Prince Knud
	Princess Elisabeth of Romania		1894	1956	1921	George, Crown Prince of Greece
	Aspasia Manos		1896	1972	1919	Alexander, King of the Hellenes
	Princess Frederica of Hanover		1917	1981	1938	Paul, Hereditary Prince of Greece
	Anne, Viscountess Anson		1917	1980	1950	Prince George
	Princess Anne-Marie of Denmark		1946		1964	Constantine II, King of the Hellenes
	Mary Donaldson		1972		2004	Crown Prince Frederik
	Alexandra Manley		1964		1995	Prince Joachim
	Marie Cavallier		1976		2008	Prince Joachim
	Marie-Chantal Miller		1968		1995	Paul, Crown Prince of Greece
	Tatiana Blatnik		1980		2010 div. 2024	Prince Nicholas
	Nina Flohr		1987		2020	Prince Philip
	Chrysí Vardinogiánni		1981		2025	Prince Nicholas
