= Prince George of Denmark (disambiguation) =

Prince George of Denmark (1653–1708) refers to the consort of Anne, Queen of Great Britain.

Prince George of Denmark or Prince Georg of Denmark may also refer to:

- George I of Greece (1845–1913), born Prince William of Schleswig-Holstein-Sonderburg-Glücksburg, later Prince William of Denmark, took the name George upon election to the Greek throne, son of Christian IX.
- Prince George of Greece and Denmark (1869–1957), son of George I of Greece
- George II of Greece (1890–1947), born Prince George of Greece and Denmark, grandson of George I of Greece
- Prince Georg of Denmark (1920–1986), great-grandson of Christian IX
