= Geoffrey Shakerley =

British photographer (1932–2012)

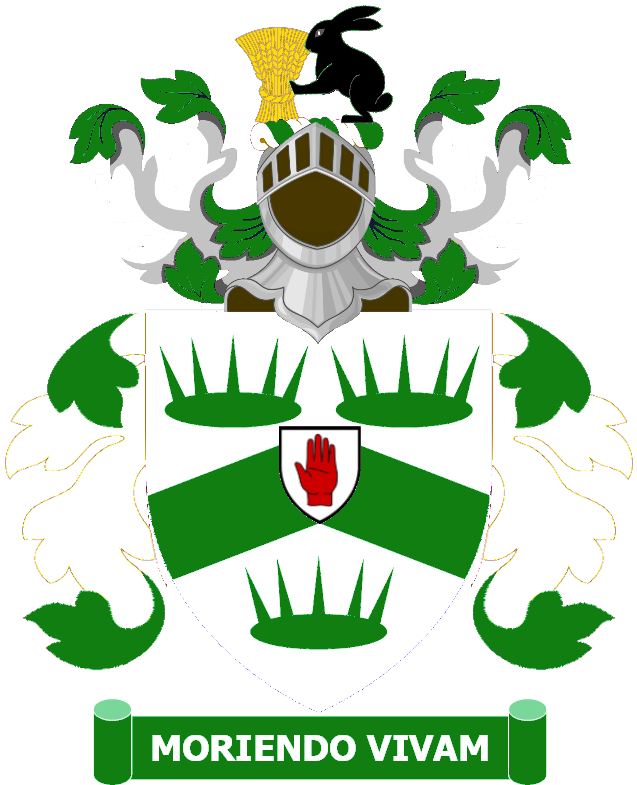
- Crest: A garb Or, on the sinister side a rabbit erect resting its fore-paws thereon Sable.
- Shield: Argent a chevron between three hillocks Vert.
- Motto: Moriendo Vivam (By Dying I Shall Live)

Sir Geoffrey Adam Shakerley, 6th Baronet (9 December 1932 – 3 December 2012) was an English aristocrat and society photographer.

== Early life and education ==
Elder son and heir of Sir Cyril Holland Shakerley, 5th Baronet, by Elizabeth Averil, née Eardley-Wilmot, he was educated at Harrow School and Trinity College, Oxford. After serving as a 2nd Lieutenant in the KRRC and studying for the Bar exams, he decided that his interest in photography would make a more fulfilling career.

== Career ==
Shakerley photographed the wedding of Prince Edward and Sophie Rhys-Jones; it was later admitted that Prince William's face was digitally enhanced by taking a happier smile from another photograph and placing it on some of the released shots to the press. He admitted to having used telephone directories, in time-honoured tradition, to adjust the height of some wedding guests in his shots.

== Personal life ==
He married his first wife, the actress Virginia Maskell in 1962; the couple had two children, born in 1963 and 1966, but Maskell died, by suicide, in 1968, by taking an overdose of sleeping tablets, and from exposure after lying down in a wood. On 27 July 1972, Shakerley married Lady Elizabeth Anson, daughter of Thomas, Viscount Anson, and Anne Bowes-Lyon, in Westminster Abbey. Her brother was society fashion photographer Patrick Lichfield. The Princess Anne was one of the bridesmaids. They had one daughter, born 18 August 1973. Lady Elizabeth and Shakerley separated in 1986 and divorced in 2009. His third wife was Virginia Hobson, whom he married in 2010.

Baronetage of the United Kingdom
Preceded by Cyril Shakerley	Baronet (of Somerford Park); 1970–2012	Succeeded by Nicholas Shakerley
