= Euphemia Sinclair =

Twentieth-century British aristocrat and socialite

Lady Euphemia Meredith Sinclair (22 June 1915 – 2005) was a British aristocrat and socialite. She was usually known by her middle name: Meredith. She was the daughter of Rev. The Hon. Charles Augustus Sinclair, son of the 16th Earl of Caithness, and his wife, The Hon. Mary Ann Harman. Notable ancestors include James VI and I, Lady Margaret Beaufort, Countess of Richmond and Derby, Robert the Bruce and Louis VI of France and her ancestry can be traced back to several notable families as far back as the 800s.

When her brother inherited the title Earl of Caithness from their uncle (the 18th Earl of Caithness) in 1948, George VI granted Lady Meredith and her sisters the style and precedence of an earl's daughter, which she would have received had her father not predeceased his brother. She grew up in the family seat, Stagenhoe in Hertfordshire, where the Bowes-Lyon family were their neighbours, and Queen Elizabeth The Queen Mother was a childhood friend.

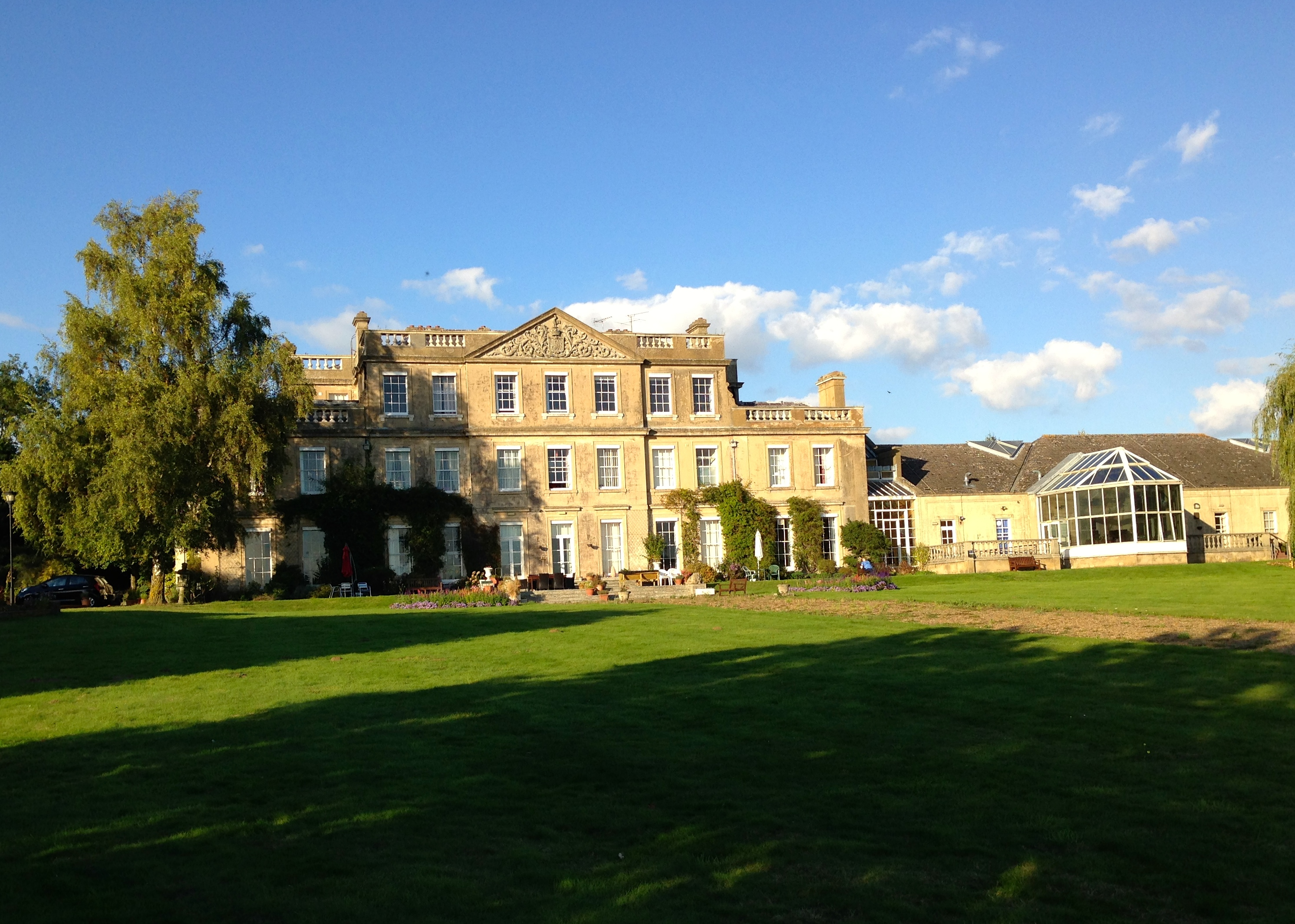
Stagenhoe, childhood home of Lady Euphemia

She married Thomas Henry Philip Herbert (a scion of the Herbert family and an heir to the Guinness family brewing fortune) in a grand society wedding in 1934 attended by George VI and Queen Elizabeth The Queen Mother, Prince George, Duke of Kent and Princess Marina of Greece and Denmark, members of both families were strongly represented with numerous members of the Guinness, Herbert and Sinclair families present, along with much of the aristocracy.

They had two children, Margaret Deborah Herbert (born 1936) and Cordelia Alexandra Herbert (born 1940). Queen Elizabeth was a godmother to her firstborn, Margaret.

Her descendants:

1. Margaret Deborah Herbert (born 1936) married Thomas Cavendish (descendant of William Cavendish, 7th Duke of Devonshire and had two children:
  1. Richard Cavendish (born 1965)
  2. Maria Cavendish (born 1969)
2. Cordelia Alexandra Herbert (born 1940) married James Wallace (scion of the Clan Wallace family) and had a daughter, Diana Wallace (born 1968)
