= Countess of Frederiksborg =

Danish noble title

- The Arms of Alexandra, Countess of Frederiksborg
- Creation date: 16 April 2005
- Created by: Margrethe II of Denmark
- Present holder: Alexandra, Countess of Frederiksborg
- Status: Extant

Countess of Frederiksborg (Danish: Grevinde af Frederiksborg) is a Danish non-hereditary substantive title of nobility created by Queen Margrethe II of Denmark for her former daughter-in-law, Alexandra.

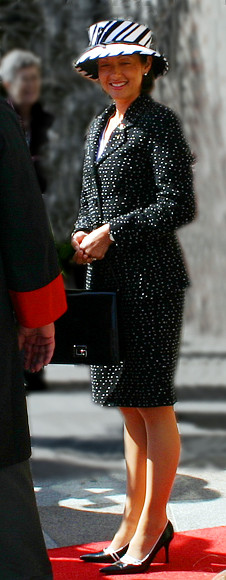
Alexandra the Countess of Frederiksborg

The title refers to Frederiksborg Castle in Hillerød, the largest Renaissance residence in Scandinavia. The title is an allusion to Alexandra's marriage to Prince Joachim of Denmark which took place in the Frederiksborg Palace Church.

The title was created by Queen Margrethe II of Denmark on her birthday, 16 April 2005, and conferred the rank of 1st class in the Danish order of precedence, entitling Alexandra to the style of "Excellency". The title is a personal substantive title of nobility and, as such, was not revoked or taken away from Alexandra when she remarried on 3 March 2007 (unlike the title of Princess). Like a life peerage in the United Kingdom, the title is held for life only and will not be inherited by her children.

Between her divorce from Prince Joachim of Denmark and her second marriage to Martin Jørgensen, Alexandra remained a Princess of Denmark and was, along with her comital title, styled from 16 April 2005 on as Her Highness Princess Alexandra of Denmark, Countess of Frederiksborg. When she remarried to Martin Jørgensen, she lost however the royal style of "Highness" and title of "Princess of Denmark". But she retained her first-class rank in the Danish ranking and has been therefore styled since 3 March 2007 as Her Excellency Alexandra, Countess of Frederiksborg.
