= St Paul's Walden =

Village in Hertfordshire, England

Coordinates: 51.88580°N 0.26690°W

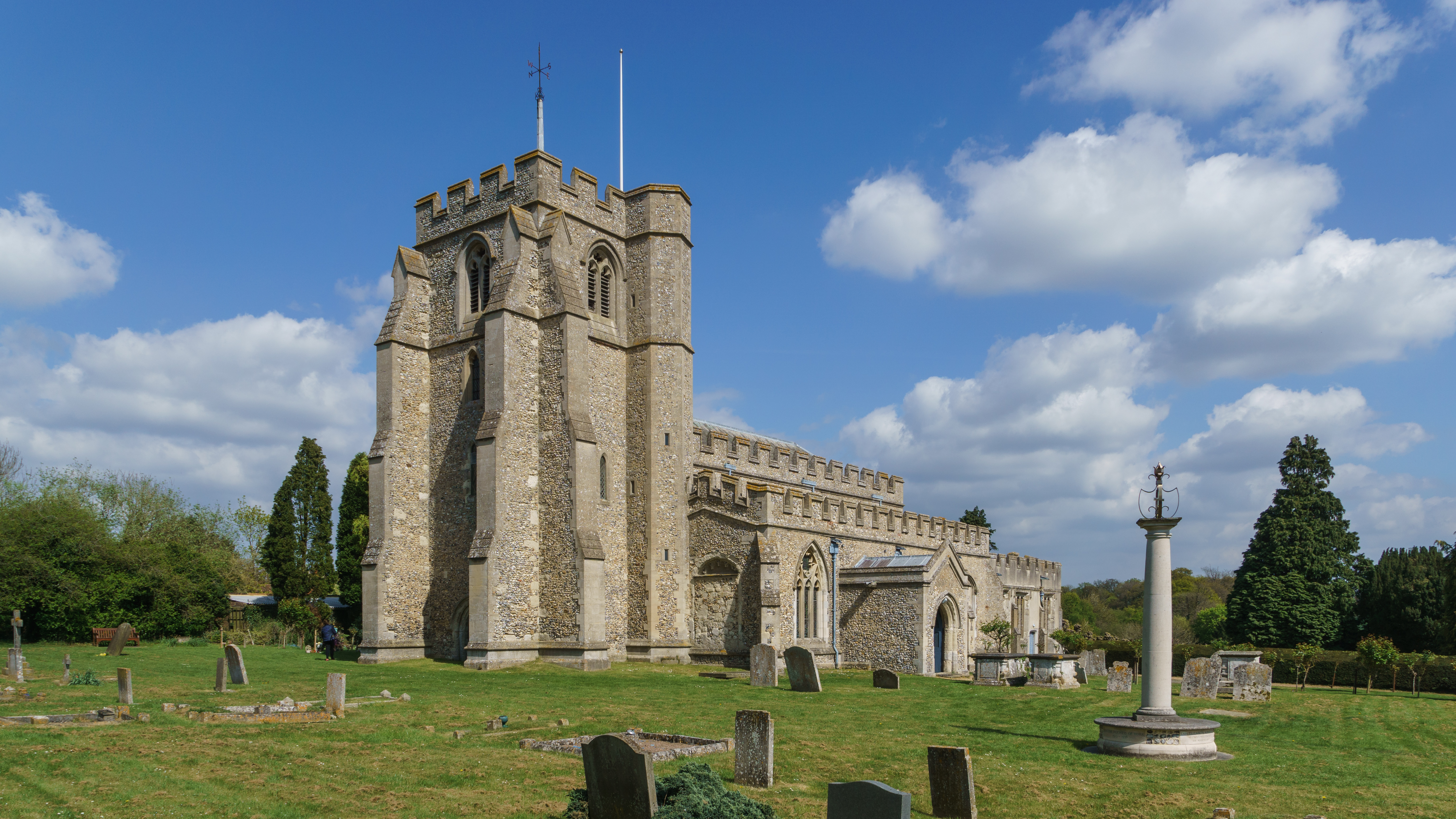
- All Saints' Church, St Paul's Walden

- Location within Hertfordshire
- Population: 1,381 (Parish, 2021)
- OS grid reference: TL193222
- District: North Hertfordshire
- Shire county: Hertfordshire
- Region: East
- Country: England
- Sovereign state: United Kingdom
- Post town: Hitchin
- Postcode district: SG4
- Dialling code: 01438
- Police: Hertfordshire
- Fire: Hertfordshire
- Ambulance: East of England
- UK Parliament: Hitchin and Harpenden

St Paul's Walden is a village and civil parish in the North Hertfordshire district of Hertfordshire, England. The village lies about 5 miles (8 km) south of Hitchin, its post town. The largest settlement in the parish is the village of Whitwell, and the parish also includes the hamlet of Bendish. At the 2021 Census, the population of the parish was 1,381.

== Geography ==
The village of St Paul's Walden itself is relatively small, comprising a few houses around the parish church, which is dedicated to All Saints. There is one public house in the village, being the Strathmore Arms.

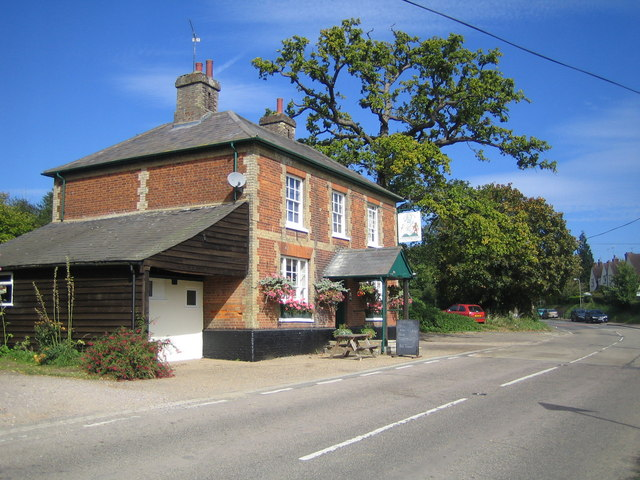
The Strathmore Arms

The wider parish also includes the village of Whitwell in the valley of the River Mimram, which flows through the centre of the parish. The village school in Whitwell is called St Paul's Walden Primary School, taking the name of the parish. The parish also includes the hamlet of Bendish, as well as surrounding rural areas, including the two large estates of Stagenhoe and St Paul's Walden Bury.

== History ==
After the Reformation the manor belonged to St Paul's Cathedral; the name St Paul's Walden serves to distinguish the parish from King's Walden, although the Dean and Chapter sold their property in the 17th century.

== Notable estates ==
St Paul's Walden has two 18th-century mansions.

=== Stagenhoe ===
Stagenhoe was once owned by the Earls of Caithness

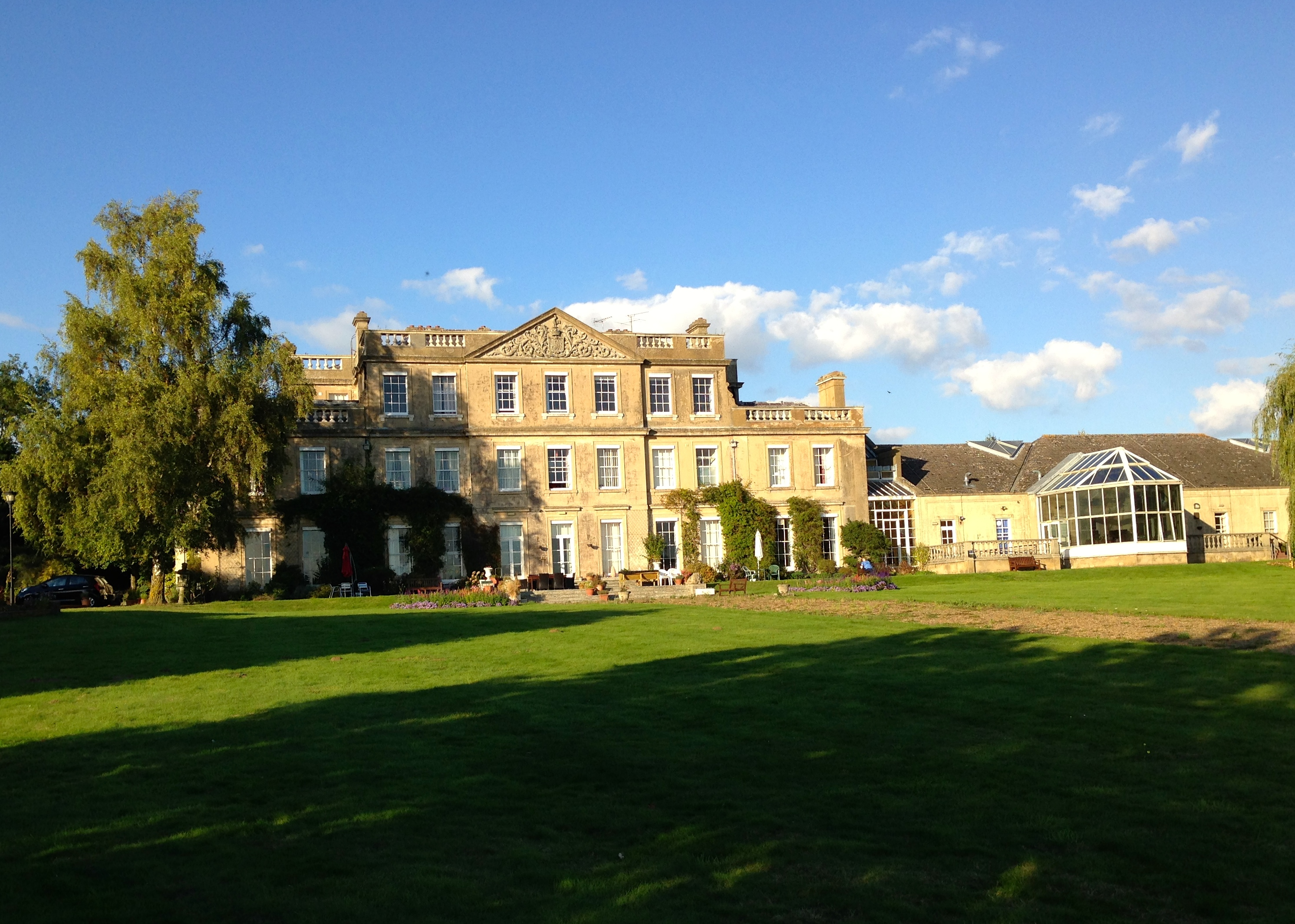
Stagenhoe

Sir Arthur Sullivan rented the property in the 1880s around the time he composed The Mikado.

=== St Paul's Walden Bury ===
St Paul's Walden Bury is owned by the Bowes-Lyon family, of which Queen Elizabeth The Queen Mother was a member. While the details of her birth in 1900 are uncertain, the house is one of the locations that has been posited as her birthplace. Whether or not she was born at St Paul's Walden Bury, she was baptised at All Saints' Church in St Paul's Walden.

On 23 January 1923, the then Prince Albert, Duke of York, later to become King George VI, drove up to St Paul's Walden in his sports car, and proposed to Elizabeth in the woods at the Bury.

The gardens of St Paul's Walden Bury are listed as grade I on the Register of Historic Parks and Gardens of Special Historic Interest in England. They are occasionally opened to the public under the National Garden Scheme, a charity of which the Queen Mother was patron.

== Governance ==
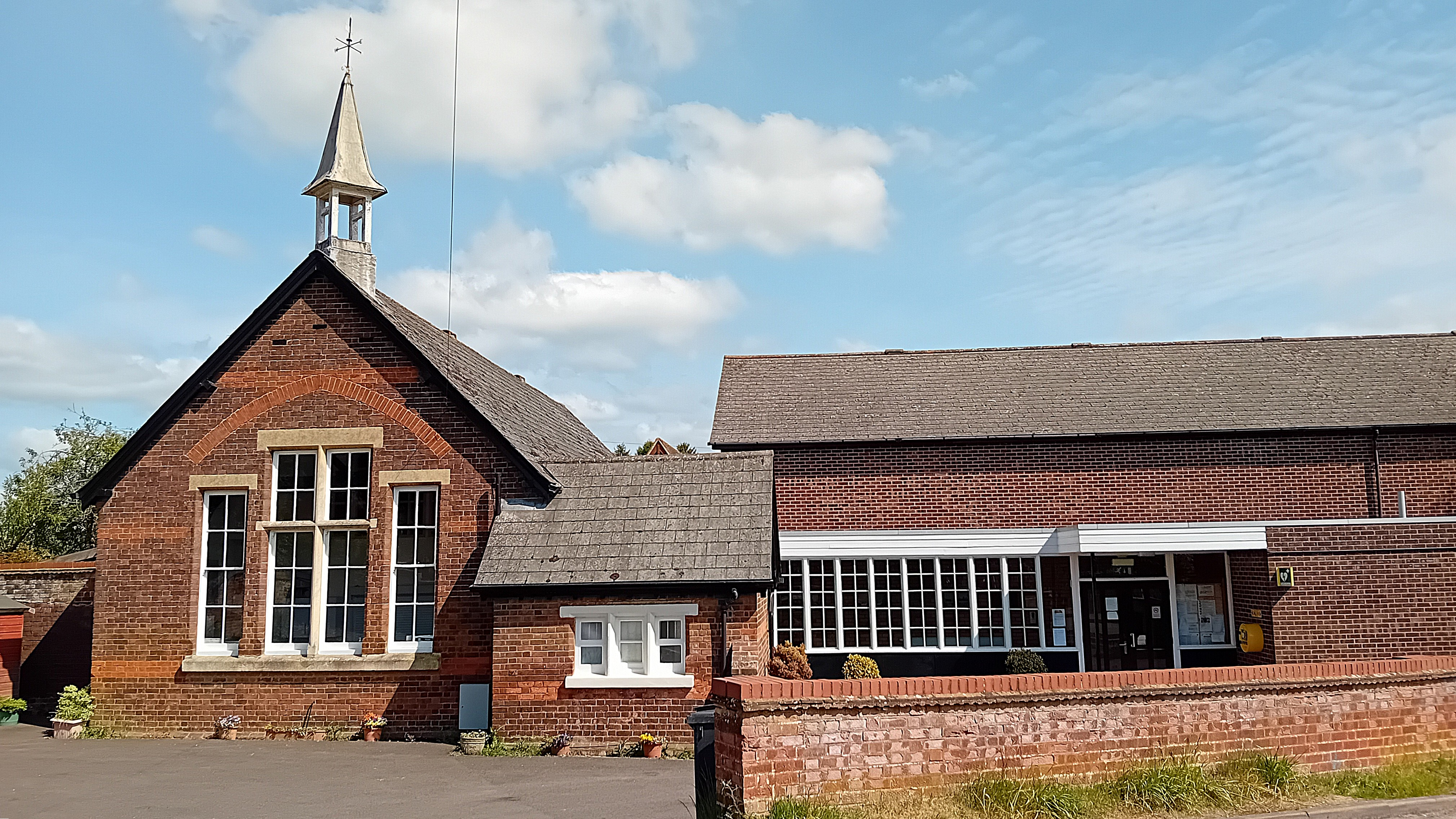
New Fellowship Hall, Whitwell

There are three tiers of local government covering St Paul's Walden, at parish, district, and county level: St Paul's Walden Parish Council, North Hertfordshire District Council, and Hertfordshire County Council. The parish council meets in Whitwell, either at the village hall on Bendish Lane, known as the New Fellowship Hall, or at the pavilion at the recreation ground on Bradway.

== Population ==
At the 2021 census, the population of the parish was 1,381. The population had been 1,293 in 2011.
