= Nerissa and Katherine Bowes-Lyon =

First cousins of Queen Elizabeth II

Nerissa Bowes-Lyon
- Born: 18 February 1919; Chelsea, London, England
- Died: 22 January 1986 (aged 66); Royal Earlswood Hospital, Redhill, England

Katherine Bowes-Lyon
- Born: 4 July 1926; London, England
- Died: 23 February 2014 (aged 87); Surrey, England

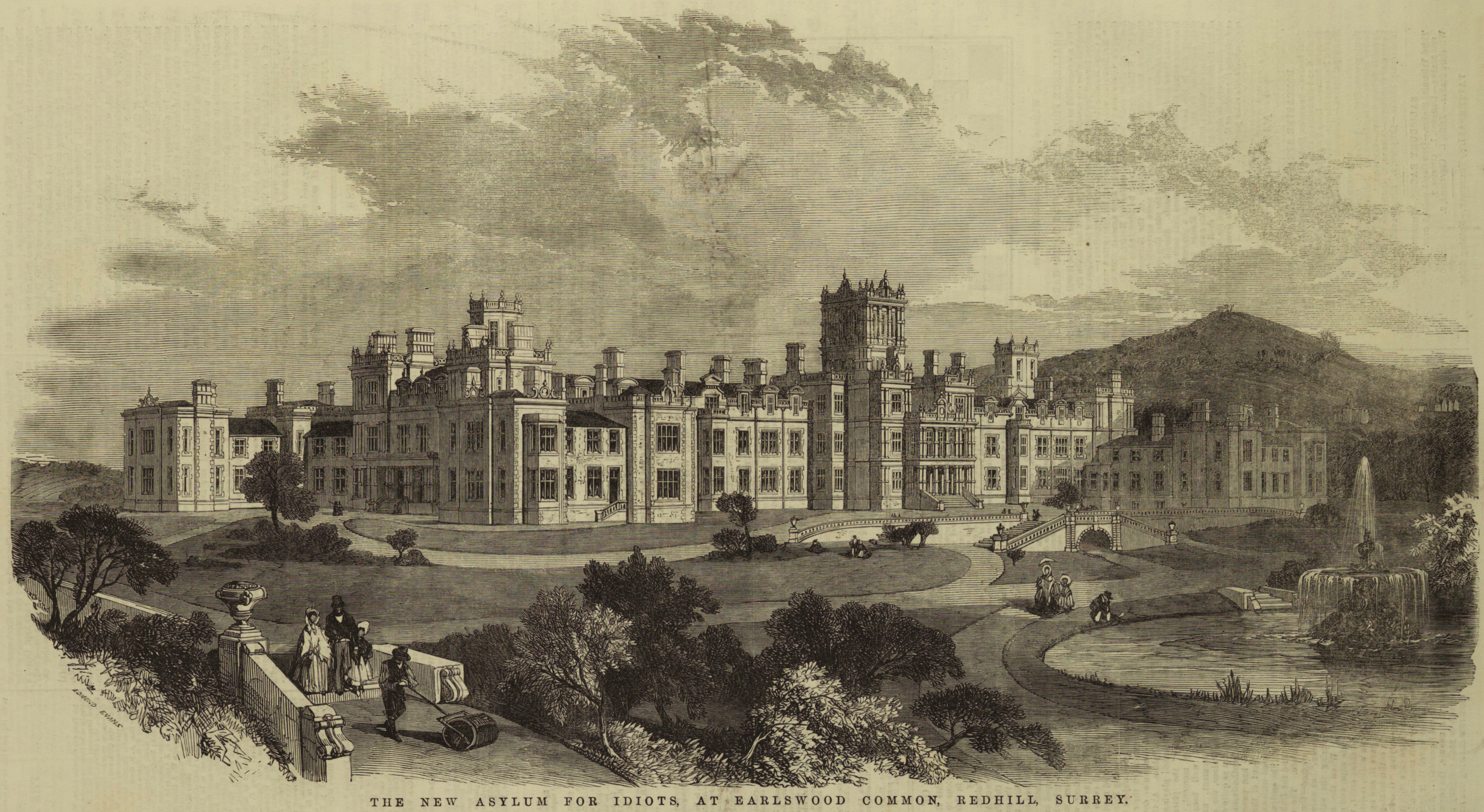
Royal Earlswood Hospital c. 1854

Nerissa Jane Irene Bowes-Lyon (18 February 1919 – 22 January 1986) and Katherine Juliet Bowes-Lyon (4 July 1926 – 23 February 2014) were two mentally disabled daughters of John Herbert Bowes-Lyon and his wife Fenella (née Hepburn-Stuart-Forbes-Trefusis). John was the brother of Queen Elizabeth the Queen Mother, thus his two daughters were the maternal first cousins of Queen Elizabeth II and Princess Margaret, sharing one pair of grandparents, Claude Bowes-Lyon, 14th Earl of Strathmore and Kinghorne, and Cecilia Bowes-Lyon, Countess of Strathmore and Kinghorne.

== Background ==
Nerissa Bowes-Lyon was born on 18 February 1919 and Katherine Bowes-Lyon was born on 4 July 1926, the daughters of John Herbert Bowes-Lyon and Fenella Hepburn-Stuart-Forbes-Trefusis. They were both born in London. Their father, the second son of Claude Bowes-Lyon, 14th Earl of Strathmore and Kinghorne, was a brother of Lady Elizabeth Bowes-Lyon, Duchess of York, the future Queen Elizabeth II's mother. Their mother was the younger daughter of Charles Hepburn-Stuart-Forbes-Trefusis, 21st Baron Clinton.

The sisters’ maternal great-grandparents, the 20th Baron Clinton and his wife Harriet Williamina Hepburn-Forbes, were first cousins, and their son, the sisters’ grand-father the 21st Baron Clinton, married his second cousin once removed, Lady Jane McDonnell.

Their father died on 7 February 1930, aged 43, after contracting pneumonia, leaving their mother to care for their four young children.

The 1963 edition of Burke's Peerage listed Nerissa and Katherine as having died in 1940 and 1961, respectively. However, in 1987 it was revealed by The Sun newspaper that the sisters were still alive, having been placed in Earlswood Hospital for mentally disabled people in 1941. In the terminology of the era, both were classified as "imbeciles", and neither learned to talk. Nerissa died in 1986, aged 66, with only hospital staff attending her funeral, while Katherine died in 2014, aged 87. The sisters received no money from their family, other than £125 paid to Earlswood each year. Earlswood Hospital closed in 1997.

== Controversy ==
Suggestions of a cover-up were rejected in the press by Lord Clinton in 1987, who claimed that his aunt Fenella (the mother of the two women) had completed the form for Burke's incorrectly due to Fenella being "a vague person"; however, Burke's included specific dates of death for both sisters. According to a 2011 television documentary about the sisters, The Queen's Hidden Cousins, broadcast by Channel 4, "throughout their time at the hospital, there is no known record that the sisters were ever visited by any member of the Bowes-Lyon or royal families, despite their aunt, the Queen Mother, being a Patron of Mencap" (a charity for people with learning disabilities). Nurses interviewed on the documentary said that, to their knowledge, the family never sent the sisters a birthday or Christmas gift or card. When Nerissa died in 1986, none of her family attended the funeral. She was buried at the nearby Redstone Cemetery, Earlswood. Her grave was marked with plastic tags and a serial number until her existence was revealed in the media, after which the family added a gravestone.

Sources from within the family, however, report that their mother Fenella often visited the two sisters until her death in 1966; Lady Elizabeth Shakerley, Fenella's granddaughter, also said other members of the family had often visited over the years and had often sent gifts and cards on Christmas and birthdays. Queen Elizabeth the Queen Mother, upon discovering that her nieces were alive in 1982, sent money for toys and sweets on their birthdays and at Christmas.

The three grandchildren of Fenella and John (Lady Elizabeth Shakerley, the 5th Earl of Lichfield, and Katherine Somervell) organised the headstone for Nerissa Bowes-Lyon.

== Other family members ==
Three mentally-disabled cousins of the girls also lived in Earlswood Hospital. Harriet Hepburn-Stuart-Forbes-Trefusis (1887–1958), sister of Nerissa and Katherine's mother Fenella, married Major Henry Nevile Fane, and three of their seven children lived in Earlswood Hospital. David Danks, then director of the Murdoch Children's Research Institute, thought that a genetic disease in the Hepburn-Stuart-Forbes-Trefusis family may have been the cause of death of some male family members in early childhood and caused learning disabilities in some female family members.

According to Lady Colin Campbell, whose mother was a friend of a doctor who treated the sisters, they suffered from Huntington's disease.

In 1996, the surviving cousins were moved to Ketwin House care home in Surrey. When it closed in 2001, they were moved to another care home in Surrey.

Anne Tennant, Baroness Glenconner was, as a young woman and 1950s debutante of the year, engaged to Johnnie, Viscount Althorp, later the Earl Spencer and father to Diana, Princess of Wales; his father objected to the match on the grounds of "mad blood", as one of her grandmothers was a Trefusis, and the engagement was broken off.

== The Queen's Hidden Cousins ==
In November 2011, Channel 4 broadcast a documentary about the sisters, The Queen's Hidden Cousins. The documentary was directed by Kelly Close and made by Minnow Films, an independent production company, whose synopsis states that "Whilst their sisters Elizabeth and Anne enjoyed lives of privilege and inclusion in the upper echelons of the aristocracy, Katherine and Nerissa were all but forgotten, written out of family history." By telling the story of the individuals, and using the testimony of those who had lived alongside them in the asylum, the film hoped to contextualise "the changing attitudes to learning disability in British society over the twentieth century."

Prior to the screening, the Daily Express reported that the Queen was said to be "hugely distressed" by it. Lady Elizabeth Shakerley, party planner to the Queen and the sisters' niece, responded at length, disputing both the assertions by the programme-makers of familial abandonment and the methods of "this supposedly factual documentary". She called it "cruel" and "intrusive" and said that "far from being a taboo subject, Katherine and Nerissa were very much a part of the family as sisters of Shakerley's mother, the late Princess Anne of Denmark."

The Daily Telegraph described the documentary as "sad but revealing". Following the programme's broadcast, The Guardian's reviewer John Crace wrote that "All we learned was just common knowledge." Crace observed that it was Nerissa's death in 1986 which had sparked the tabloid interest in the story the following year. He also commented on the absence of any attempt to find out why the sisters had been placed in care in 1941, writing "this was the one part of the story that was genuinely still a mystery."

== In popular culture ==
The sisters were depicted in the seventh episode of the fourth season of the Netflix drama series The Crown, "The Hereditary Principle", which premiered in 2020. However, the way the events are reported is largely fictitious.

== See also ==
- Thomas Lyon-Bowes, Master of Glamis (born 1821)
- Rosemary Kennedy
