= Bendish =

Hamlet in Hertfordshire, England

Coordinates: 51.879°N 0.308°W

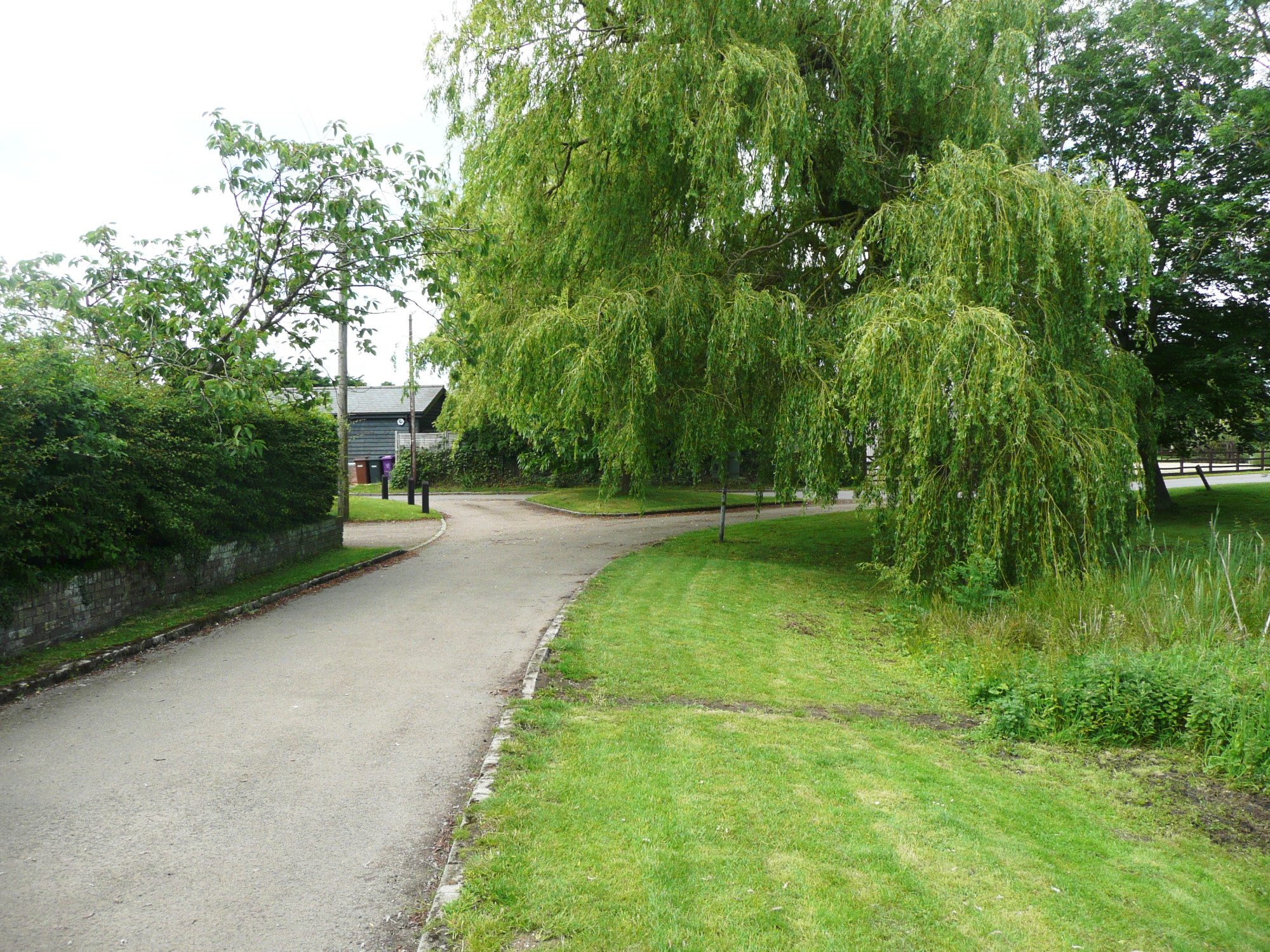
- Part of the village green at Bendish

- Location within Hertfordshire
- Population: 57
- OS grid reference: TL165215
- Civil parish: St Paul's Walden
- District: North Hertfordshire
- Shire county: Hertfordshire
- Region: East
- Country: England
- Sovereign state: United Kingdom
- Post town: HITCHIN
- Postcode district: SG4
- Dialling code: 01438
- Police: Hertfordshire
- Fire: Hertfordshire
- Ambulance: East of England
- UK Parliament: Hitchin

Bendish is a hamlet located in the parish of St Paul's Walden in Hertfordshire. In the 18th century, Bendish was a small town. It is about 3 miles east of Luton, 5 miles south of Hitchin and 4.5 miles north of Harpenden. Many services such as the grocers, the 3 pubs and the Church have all closed.

Bendish is not a nucleated hamlet, due to the effects of rural to urban migration through the unemployment of residents as of the result of mechanisation. Farmers' houses were knocked down, leading to the somewhat staggered placing of the current houses today. There is no longer an active telephone box, but a post box is still in operation.
