= Alexandra, Countess of Frederiksborg =

Ex-wife of Prince Joachim of Denmark

Alexandra
- Countess of Frederiksborg
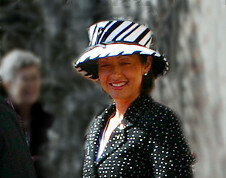
- The then Princess Alexandra in Aalborg, 2004
- Born: Alexandra Christina Manley; 30 June 1964 (age 62); Hong Kong
- Spouses: Prince Joachim of Denmark (m. 1995; div. 2005) Martin Jørgensen (m. 2007; div. 2015)
- Issue: Count Nikolai; Count Felix
- Father: Richard Nigel Manley
- Mother: Christa Maria Nowotny

Chinese name
- Chinese: 文雅麗
Transcriptions
Standard Mandarin
- Hanyu Pinyin: Wan Yǎ Lì
Yue: Cantonese
- Jyutping: Man4 Ngaa5 Lai6

Alexandra, Countess of Frederiksborg, RE, formerly Princess Alexandra of Denmark (Alexandra Christina; née Manley; born 30 June 1964), is the former wife of Prince Joachim of Denmark, the younger brother of King Frederik X of Denmark.

She was born in Hong Kong, and is of mixed Asian and European ancestry. She was introduced to Prince Joachim in 1994. They married in 1995, and had two sons together, then divorced in 2005.

== Early life and family ==
Alexandra Manley was born in Hong Kong, as the eldest of three daughters of Richard Nigel Manley (11 August 1924 – 12 January 2010) and Christa Maria Manley (née Nowotny; 1933 – 5 January 2023). Her father was a Chinese-English insurance company executive and her mother was an Austrian-Czech manager of a communications company. She was baptized at the Cathedral of Saint John, Hong Kong. She attended Quarry Bay Junior School (1969–1971), Glenealy School (1971–1974) and Island School (1974–1982), all in Hong Kong.

Manley studied international business at Vienna University of Economics and Business in Austria. She also went to Japan and England for studies. It is not known whether she obtained a university degree. From 1990 to 1995, she was employed by GT Management (Asia) Ltd., Hong Kong, where from 1990 to 1993 she worked in Sales and Marketing and from 1993 as a deputy chief executive of that department.

== First marriage and children ==
Alexandra met Prince Joachim at a private dinner in Hong Kong in January 1994, where he was working for a Danish shipping company. After a whirlwind courtship, thought to have begun in late 1994, Prince Joachim presented Alexandra with a diamond and ruby engagement ring while on vacation in the Philippines. Their engagement was officially announced in May 1995.

They were married on 18 November 1995, by Queen Margrethe's Chaplain-in-Ordinary, in Frederiksborg Castle Church, the Chapel of the Order of the Elephant, in Hillerød. The wedding festivities were held at Fredensborg Palace. The bride's gown was designed by Jørgen Bender and she wore the Alexandrine Drop Tiara, originally the property of Duchess Alexandrine of Mecklenburg-Schwerin, which was a wedding gift from Queen Margrethe.

When Alexandra married Joachim, she gave up her career in marketing. It is believed that she had renounced her British citizenship prior to become a Danish citizen upon her marriage.

During their 9-year marriage, Joachim and Alexandra welcomed two sons. On 28 August 1999, Count Nikolai, the first grandchild of the Queen and Prince Consort, was born. His younger brother, Count Felix, followed three years later on 22 July 2002.

== Life as a princess ==
Alexandra became popular with the Danish people. Known for her fashion sense and charity work, she was dubbed the Diana of the North. She is a native English and German speaker (through her father and mother, respectively), and her fluency in German helped her pick up the Danish language quickly. Within a few months, she spoke it nearly without an accent, which further endeared her to the Danes. As she said in an interview, "I don't find the grammar especially difficult, but the pronunciation can be hard, since we swallow some of our words. It reminds me a little of Chinese, with the glottal stop … Saying something with an upswing or a downswing can give a word an entirely different meaning," she explained. "It was my decision to learn the language immediately. It would have been terrible to have to stand up and speak English at an engagement, or thank someone for something. It would have been utterly wrong. This is my home, and so there was no other option".

Both during and after her marriage, she was involved in numerous philanthropic pursuits, including the Youth Red Cross, the Danish Society for the Blind, UNICEF, and single mothers' advocacy group, Mother Help. She also served as a UNICEF ambassador when she travelled to Thailand to visit HIV/AIDS patients.

== End of marriage ==
On 16 September 2004, Alexandra and Joachim announced their separation and eventual intention to divorce. It would be the first in the Royal Family since 1846. The Folketing decided to put Alexandra on the civil list for life, independent of her possible future remarriage. Alexandra's payments of her new yearly allowance of 2.1m kroner (US$330,000) started retroactively from 1 October 2004. The couple divorced on 8 April 2005.

On 23 June 2017, she announced that she would renounce her entitlement to the Danish civil list in July 2020, coinciding with the 18th birthday of Prince Felix.

== Second marriage and current life ==
As early as mid-2005, there were reports and pictures of Alexandra with Martin Jørgensen, the son of Jacob Jørgensen, a well-known film producer whose company, JJ Film, has produced – and continues to produce – numerous documentaries in which the Danish royal family has participated.

Alexandra married Martin Jørgensen on 3 March 2007 in a private ceremony at Øster Egede Church near Fakse. She was walked down the aisle by her sons, Nikolai (aged nearly 7) and Felix (aged nearly 4). Aside from the young princes, no one from the Danish royal family attended the ceremony. As a result of her remarriage Alexandra lost her title as a Princess of Denmark and ceased to be a member of the Danish Royal Family. In September 2015, it was announced that Jørgensen and the Countess were divorcing after eight and a half years of marriage. The Countess had cited differences in values as the reason for the divorce. The divorce was finalised in 2015.

In 2007, the Countess of Frederiksborg joined the Danish board of directors of Ferring Pharmaceuticals. In 2017, it was announced that she would take up the position of Poling Chair of Business and Government at the Indiana University Kelley School of Business.

Alexandra still occasionally attends events with her former husband and the rest of the Danish royal family. Among other events, in 2012, she attended a gala performance at Koncerthuset in honour of Queen Margrethe II's 40th jubilee, and in 2018, she attended the gala dinner for her former brother-in-law Crown Prince Frederik's 50th birthday at Christiansborg Palace.

== Titles, styles, honours and arms ==
Alexandra's monogram

=== Titles and styles ===
Alexandra Manley became known as "Her Royal Highness Princess Alexandra of Denmark" upon her marriage to Prince Joachim. After her divorce, she assumed the lesser style of "Her Highness" and was granted the additional title "Countess of Frederiksborg". She lost her princely title upon remarriage and became known as "Her Excellency Alexandra, Countess of Frederiksborg".

=== Honours ===
==== National honours ====
- Denmark:
  - Knight of the Order of the Elephant (R.E.)
  - Member of the Royal Family Decoration of Queen Margrethe II
  - Recipient of the Commemorative Medal of the Silver Jubilee of Queen Margrethe II

==== Foreign honours ====
- Finland: Grand Cross of the Order of the White Rose of Finland
- Luxembourg: Grand Cross of the Order of Adolphe of Nassau
- Romania: Grand Cross of the Order of the Star of Romania

=== Arms ===
Arms as Princess Alexandra (1995–2005).

Arms as Countess of Frederiksborg (2005–)
