= Charles Hepburn-Stuart-Forbes-Trefusis, 21st Baron Clinton =

British peer (1863–1957)

The Right Honourable The Lord Clinton GCVO PC
- Portrait by Walter Stoneman, 1927

Personal details
- Born: 18 January 1863
- Died: 5 July 1957 (aged 94)
- Spouse: Jane McDonnell (m. 1886; died 1953)
- Children: 2
- Parent: Charles Hepburn-Stuart-Forbes-Trefusis (father)
- Relatives: Jack Tre (brother); Mark Rolle (uncle); Charles Trefusis, 19th Baron Clinton (grandfather)
- Education: University of Oxford

Charles John Robert Hepburn-Stuart-Forbes-Trefusis, 21st Baron Clinton GCVO PC (18 January 1863 – 5 July 1957) was a British peer.

== Biography ==
Trefusis was the eldest son of the 20th Baron Clinton and his wife, Harriet. Educated at Oxford he played polo with the University team and won the Varsity Match against Cambridge in 1883. On 1 June 1886, he married Lady Jane McDonnell (15 June 1863 – 27 August 1953) (a daughter of the 5th Earl of Antrim and his second cousin once-removed) and they had two daughters:

- Harriet (14 November 1887 – 15 March 1958), married Major Henry Nevile Fane (1883 – 2 August 1947). They had seven children.
- Fenella (19 August 1889 – 19 July 1966), married John Herbert Bowes-Lyon. They had five children, including Anne Bowes-Lyon, Nersissa Bowes-Lyon, and Katherine Bowes-Lyon

From 1898 until he succeeded to his father's title in 1904, Trefusis was Convener of Kincardineshire County Council. In 1911, Lord Clinton was admitted to the Duchy of Cornwall Council and was appointed the duchy's Keeper of the Privy Seal in 1913 and Lord Warden of the Stannaries in 1921. From 1918 to 1919, he was Joint Parliamentary Secretary to the Board of Agriculture and Fisheries, Chairman of the Forestry Commission from 1927 to 1929, and a director of the Southern Railway. Lord Clinton had also been admitted to the Privy Council in 1927 and on his retirement in 1933, he was appointed a GCVO.

Upon Lord Clinton's death in 1957, his title became abeyant between his two daughters until it was called out of abeyance for his great-grandson (by Harriet), Gerard Fane-Trefusis, 22nd Baron Clinton, in 1965.

== Sources ==
- Burke's Peerage & Gentry

Court offices
| Preceded by The Earl of Mount Edgcumbe | Keeper of the Privy Seal of the Duchy of Cornwall; 1913 – 1933 | Succeeded by The Earl of Radnor |
| Preceded by The Lord Balfour of Burleigh | Lord Warden of the Stannaries; 1921 – 1933 | Succeeded by The Earl of Radnor |
Political offices
| Preceded by The Duke of Marlborough; The Viscount Goschen | Joint Parliamentary Secretary to the Board of Agriculture and Fisheries; 1918 – 1919; With: Sir Richard Winfrey | Succeeded by Sir Arthur Griffith-Boscawen |
Government offices
| Preceded by The Lord Lovat | Chairman of the Forestry Commission; 1927–1929 | Succeeded by Sir John Stirling-Maxwell |
Peerage of England
| Preceded by Charles Hepburn-Stuart-Forbes-Trefusis | Baron Clinton; 1904 – 1957 | In abeyance Title next held by Gerald Fane-Trefusis |
