= Anne Bowes-Lyon =

British noblewoman and Danish princess (1917–1980)

- Viscountess Anson; Princess Georg of Denmark
- Anne in 1955
- Born: Anne Ferelith Fenella Bowes-Lyon; 4 December 1917; Washington, D.C., U.S.
- Died: 26 September 1980 (aged 62); London, England
- Burial: Bernstorff Palace, Gentofte, Denmark
- Spouse: Thomas Anson, Viscount Anson (m. 1938; div. 1948) Prince Georg of Denmark (m. 1950)
- Issue: Patrick Anson, 5th Earl of Lichfield; Lady Elizabeth Shakerley
- Noble family: Bowes-Lyon
- Father: John Bowes-Lyon
- Mother: Fenella Hepburn-Stuart-Forbes-Trefusis

Anne Ferelith Fenella Bowes-Lyon (4 December 1917 – 26 September 1980) was a British noblewoman and member of the Danish royal family by marriage.

Born into the Bowes-Lyon family, Anne was a niece of Queen Elizabeth the Queen Mother and a first cousin of Elizabeth II and Princess Margaret. In 1938, she married Thomas Anson, Viscount Anson, becoming Viscountess Anson by marriage. They had two children, Patrick Anson, 5th Earl of Lichfield and Lady Elizabeth Shakerley, before divorcing in 1948. She became Princess Anne of Denmark through her second marriage to Prince Georg of Denmark in 1950.

== Early life and family ==
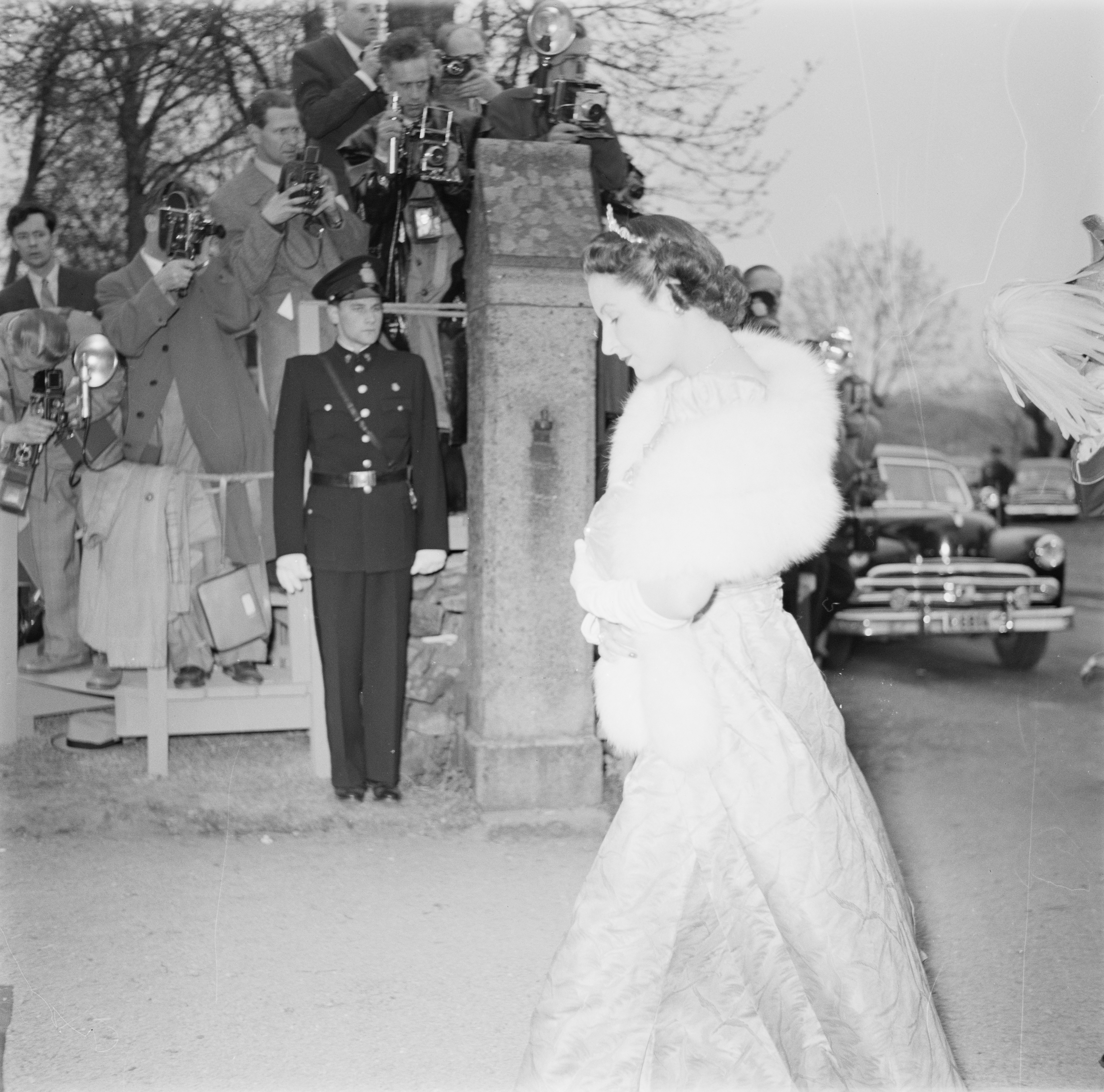
Anne at the wedding of Princess Ragnhild of Norway, 15 May 1953

Born in Washington, D.C. on 4 December 1917, Anne Bowes-Lyon was the daughter of the Hon. John Herbert Bowes-Lyon, son of the 14th Earl of Strathmore and Kinghorne, and the Hon. Fenella Hepburn-Stuart-Forbes-Trefusis (1889–1966), daughter of the 21st Lord Clinton. At the time of her birth, her father was serving at the British Embassy in Washington. She had an elder sister, Patricia (1916–1917), who died in infancy, and three younger sisters: Nerissa, Diana (1923–1986), and Katherine. Nerissa and Katherine were both born with intellectual disabilities and spent the majority of their lives in an institution.

Her father was an elder brother of Lady Elizabeth Bowes-Lyon, later Queen Elizabeth the Queen Mother, thus, Anne was a first cousin of Elizabeth II and Princess Margaret. Her father died on 7 February 1930 of pneumonia, aged 43. She was educated in England, France and Switzerland.

== First marriage ==
Anne married Lieutenant-Colonel Thomas William Arnold Anson, Viscount Anson (1913–1958), son and heir of the 4th Earl of Lichfield, at St Margaret's, Westminster, on 28 April 1938. Upon marriage, Anne became Viscountess Anson by courtesy. They had two children: Patrick, who succeeded his grandfather as 5th Earl of Lichfield, and Elizabeth.

During World War II, Anne worked for the Women's Voluntary Service and the Young Men's Christian Association while her husband served with the Grenadier Guards. The couple spent much of the war apart and separated in 1945. Anne subsequently petitioned for divorce on the grounds of desertion, and the marriage was dissolved in 1948.

== Second marriage ==
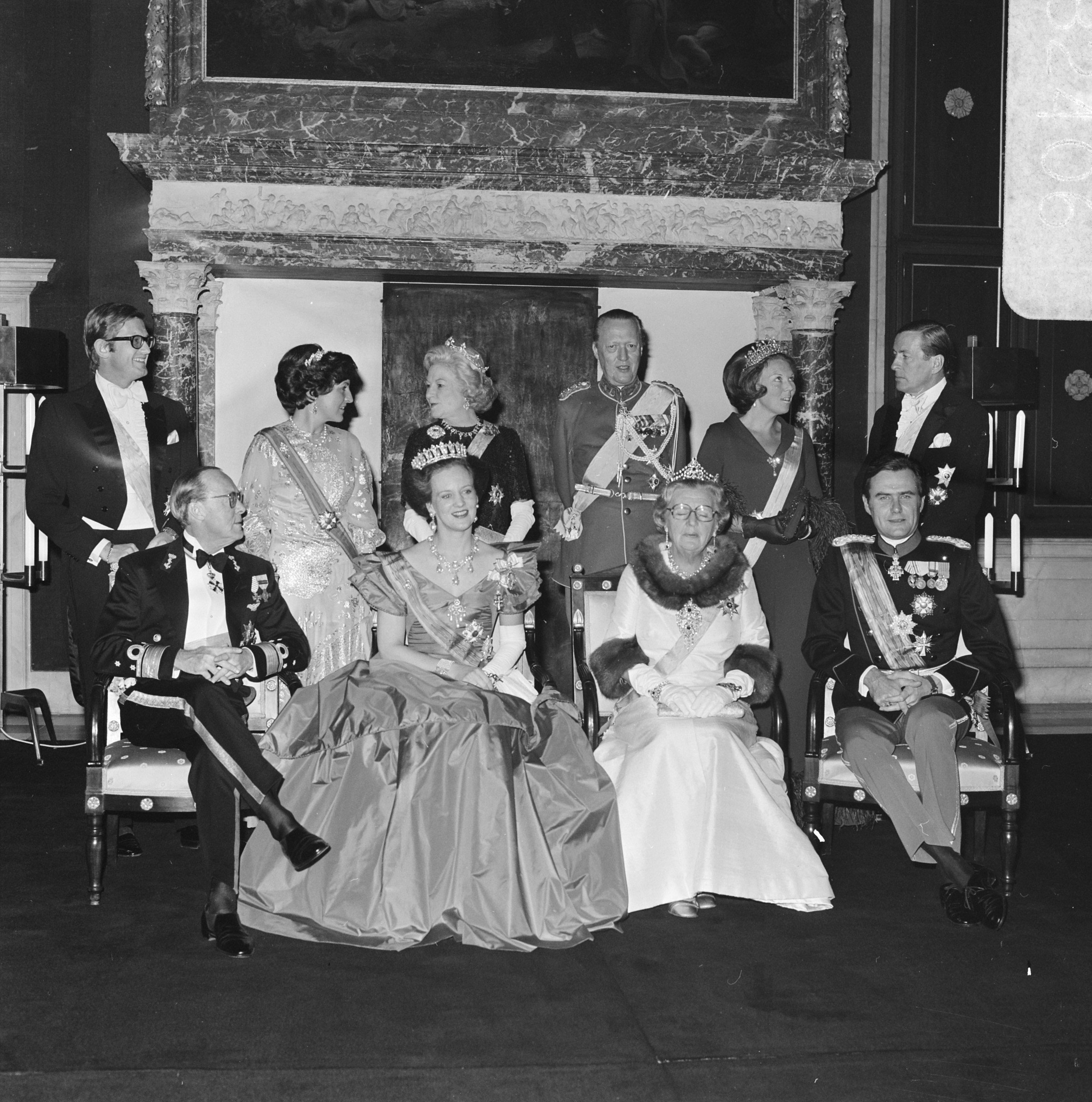
Anne, back row third from left, and Georg accompanying Margrethe II and Prince Henrik on a state visit to the Netherlands, 1975

Anne met her second husband, Prince Georg of Denmark, then acting military attaché at the Danish Embassy in London, at a ball hosted by the Swedish Embassy. At the time, Danish princes who married commoners were required to relinquish their princely titles and were instead created Counts of Rosenborg, as had occurred when Georg's brother, Count Flemming of Rosenborg, married Ruth Nielsen in 1949. Georg sought the consent of Frederik IX for the marriage, which was reportedly secured after the intervention of George VI, Anne's uncle, who is said to have remarked to the Danish king that "if a Bowes-Lyon was good enough for me, a Bowes-Lyon is surely good enough for one of your princes." Frederik IX subsequently granted his consent, allowing Georg to retain his princely title upon marriage. Their engaged was announced on 17 June 1950.

As Anne was divorced, her marriage to Prince Georg was opposed by both the Church of England and the Scottish Episcopal Church. Although her aunt, Queen Elizabeth, initially intended to attend the wedding, Geoffrey Fisher, Archbishop of Canterbury, intervened, resulting in the withdrawal of the Scottish Episcopal clergyman who had been expected to officiate and advising the Queen not to attend the ceremony. The marriage was solemnized at Glamis Castle, home of her paternal first cousin, the Earl of Strathmore and Kinghorne, on 16 September 1950 by the Rev. Mogens Buch, pastor of the Danish Seamen's Mission Church in Newcastle upon Tyne. The lesson was read by the Rev. Canon H. G. G. Rorison, chaplain to Lord Strathmore, who had been prohibited by the Anglican authorities from officiating at the service. The Queen and Princess Margaret attended the wedding breakfast, having remained in an adjoining drawing room during the ceremony.

Anne and Georg settled in London and maintained a country house in Hertfordshire. She accompanied him on diplomatic postings to cities including Paris and supported him in carrying out royal engagements on behalf of his cousins, Frederik IX and later Margrethe II. Although the couple never resided permanently in Denmark, Anne became almost fluent in Danish.

== Death ==
Anne died of a myocardial infarction at her Cadogan Square home in London on 26 September 1980, aged 62. Her funeral was held at St Alban's Church, Copenhagen, on 6 October. She was buried in the gardens of Bernstorff Palace. A memorial service was held at Westminster Abbey on 5 November and was attended by Elizabeth II, Olav V of Norway, and Queen Ingrid of Denmark.

== Honours, decorations and arms ==
- United Kingdom:
  - 12 May 1937: King George VI Coronation Medal
  - 2 June 1953: Queen Elizabeth II Coronation Medal
- Denmark:
  - 16 April 1974: Knight of the Order of the Elephant (RE)

=== Arms ===
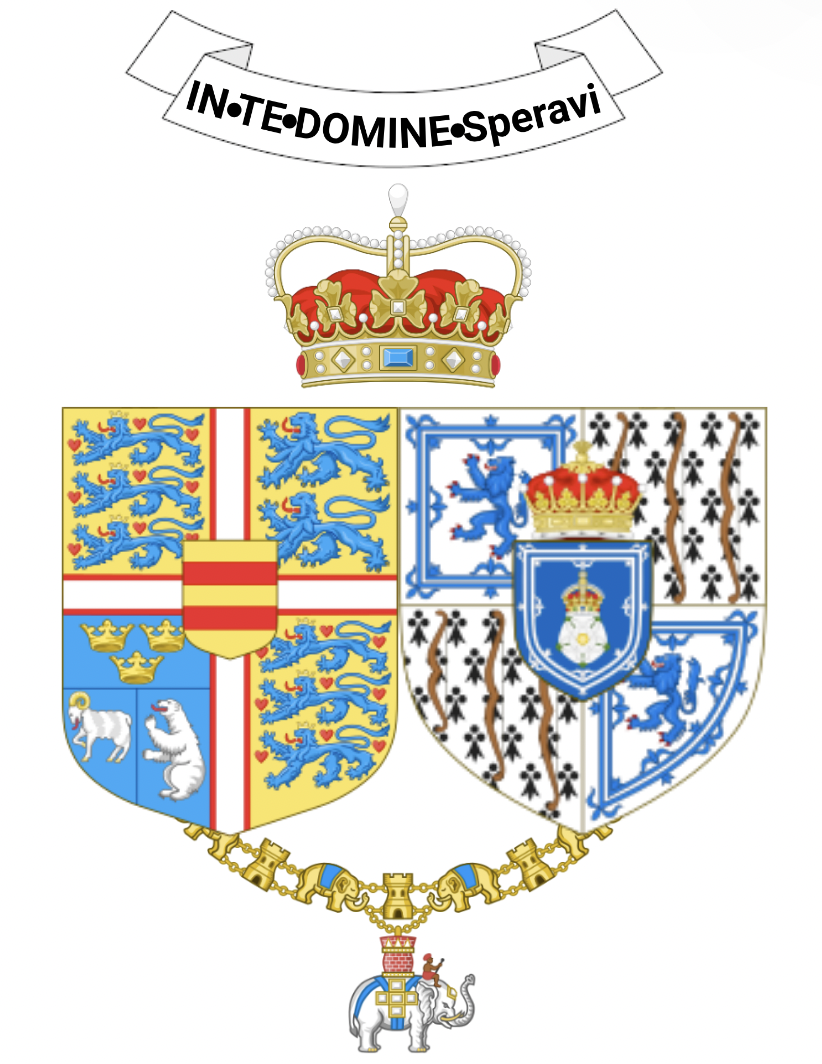
Coat of arms as Princess Anne of Denmark

== Ancestry ==
Ancestors of Anne Bowes-Lyon

8. Claude Bowes-Lyon, 13th Earl of Strathmore and Kinghorne
4. Claude Bowes-Lyon, 14th Earl of Strathmore and Kinghorne
9. Frances Dora Smith
2. The Hon. John Bowes-Lyon
10. Charles Cavendish-Bentinck
5. Cecilia Cavendish-Bentinck
11. Caroline Louisa Burnaby
1. Anne Bowes-Lyon
12. Charles Hepburn-Stuart-Forbes-Trefusis, 20th Baron Clinton
6. Charles Hepburn-Stuart-Forbes-Trefusis, 21st Baron Clinton
13. Harriet Williamina Hepburn-Forbes
3. The Hon. Fenella Hepburn-Stuart-Forbes-Trefusis
14. Mark McDonnell, 5th Earl of Antrim
7. Lady Jane Grey McDonnell
15. Jane Macan
