= Prince Joachim of Denmark =

Danish prince (born 1969)

- Count of Monpezat
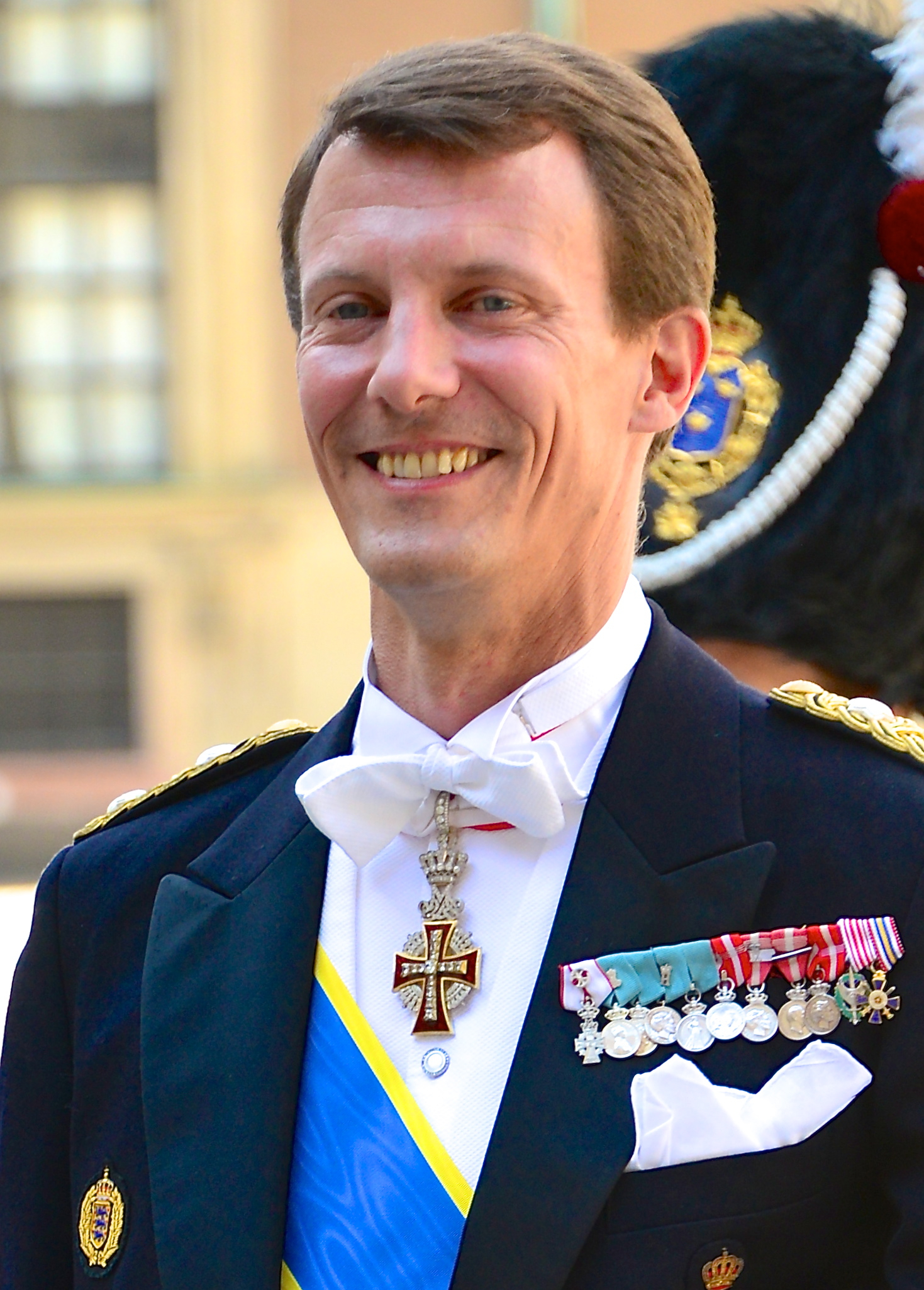
- Joachim in 2013
- Born: 7 June 1969 (age 57); Rigshospitalet, Copenhagen, Denmark
- Spouses: Alexandra Manley (m. 1995; div. 2005) Marie Cavallier (m. 2008)
- Issue: Count Nikolai; Count Felix; Count Henrik; Countess Athena
Names
- Joachim Holger Waldemar Christian
- Father: Henri de Laborde de Monpezat
- Mother: Margrethe II
- Occupation: Military attaché at the Danish embassies in France and the United States; Special expert at Danish Defence

Prince Joachim of Denmark, Count of Monpezat, RE, SKmd (Danish pronunciation: [ˈjoːæˌkʰim]; Joachim Holger Waldemar Christian; born 7 June 1969) is a member of the Danish royal family. The younger son of Queen Margrethe II, he is fifth in the line of succession to the Danish throne, following the four children of his elder brother King Frederik X.

== Early life ==
Joachim was born on 7 June 1969 at Rigshospitalet, part of the Copenhagen University Hospital in Copenhagen. He was christened Joachim Holger Waldemar Christian on 15 July 1969 in Aarhus Cathedral, the first member of the royal family to have been christened outside of Copenhagen. His godparents were his maternal aunt, Princess Benedikte of Denmark; his paternal uncle, Jean Baptiste de Laborde de Monpezat; his mother's first cousin, Princess Christina of Sweden; and King Harald V (then Crown Prince of Norway).

Joachim attended school as a private pupil from 1974 until 1976 at Amalienborg Palace and then from 1976 until 1982 at Krebs' Skole in Copenhagen. In the period 1982–1983 he studied as a boarder at École des Roches in Normandy, France. In 1986, Joachim graduated from Øregård Gymnasium. In 1993, he completed his studies in agrarian economics at Den Classenske Agerbrugskole Næsgaard. His first language is Danish, but he also speaks French (his father's language), English and German.

== Schackenborg ==
In 1993, Joachim took over the estate of Schackenborg Castle in the town of Møgeltønder, in Southern Jutland, having been granted the estate in the will of Count Hans Schack in 1978.

Joachim and his first wife, now the Countess of Frederiksborg, received 13 million DKK collected by the people of Denmark as a national gift, reserved for restoration of the estate. The restoration was completed in 1999. The couple was divorced in 2005, whereupon Countess Alexandra moved with their two sons to Copenhagen. Joachim remained at Schackenborg – from 2007 alongside his second wife – until 2014 when the estate was handed over to the Schackenborg Foundation, which consists of Joachim, Bitten and Mads Clausens foundation, Ole Kirks Foundation, and Ecco Holding. Joachim, Marie and their children moved from the castle to Klampenborg, north of Copenhagen, but still holiday at the castle. In 2023, they sold their home at Klampenborg and purchased a home at Vedbaek.

== Military career ==
=== As junior officer ===
In 1987, Joachim enlisted as a recruit in the Queen's Life Regiment, where from he first entered the NCO School and where after the lieutenant school. Between 1989 and 1990, he served as platoon commander in the 3rd tank squadron/1st Battalion (3/I/PLR) of the Prince's Life Regiment.

In 1992 He entered the Royal Danish Military Academy's course for reserve officers to become a captain.

Between 1996 and 2004, he served as squadron commander of 3rd tank squadron/2nd Battalion (3/II/PLR) also in the Prince's Life Regiment.

=== As senior officer ===
In 2005 he was a staff officer in the staff of Danske Division and from 2011 He was liaison officer at the Defence Region of Fuen and South Jutland.

In 2015, Joachim was appointed special advisor to the Chief of Defense in the Royal Danish Army.

During the summer of 2019, Joachim, Princess Marie and their two children moved to Paris, France, while the Prince had been admitted to the highest-ranking military educational program at École Militaire by invitation from the French Minister of Defense. Joachim graduated on 26 June 2020, being the first Danish Officer to complete the two-part special education.

=== As general officer and Denmark's military attaché to France ===
Earlier in June 2020, Minister of Defence Trine Bramsen promoted Joachim to Brigadier General due to his new acquired educational merits at École Militaire. He was subsequently named Military Attaché at the Royal Danish Embassy in Paris, France, by the Danish Ministry of Defense, a position he was expected to hold for at least three years while maintaining his patronages and royal engagements in Denmark when possible. Joachim commenced his new position on 1 September 2020.

On 24 July 2020, while on holiday in Château de Cayx, Joachim was admitted to Toulouse University Hospital for surgery on a blood clot in his brain. He was discharged from hospital in early August.

=== Denmark's military attaché to the United States ===
In March 2023, it was announced that Joachim, Marie and their two younger children would be moving to Washington, D.C. where he would be taking up the role of defence industry attaché (Defence Industrial Cooperation Attaché) at the Danish Embassy from September 2023. He concurrently serves as the Deputy Defence Attaché (Danish: stedfortrædende forsvarsattaché). In September 2025, the Danish Defence Ministry stated that he had been extended in both positions until August 2027.

== Marriages and children ==
=== First marriage ===
On 18 November 1995, at Frederiksborg Palace Church in Hillerød, near Copenhagen, Joachim married Alexandra Christina Manley, a Hong Kong-born former sales and marketing deputy chief executive of English, Chinese, and Austrian ancestry. The couple had two sons, Count Nikolai and Count Felix.

The couple announced their separation on 16 September 2004; their divorce was final on 8 April 2005. The couple shared custody of their sons until they came of age. Alexandra received the title of Countess of Frederiksborg, and was permitted to retain the courtesy title of princess pending remarriage. She subsequently remarried and forfeited the royal title, but retained the title of countess. She continues to live in Denmark.

=== Second marriage ===
On 3 October 2007, the Danish court announced that Joachim had become engaged to French native Marie Cavallier. Their wedding took place on 24 May 2008 in Møgeltønder Church near Schackenborg Castle. The wedding date marked the 73rd anniversary of the wedding of Joachim's grandparents, King Frederik IX and Queen Ingrid of Denmark. The couple have two children, Count Henrik and Countess Athena.

None of Joachim's four children have been styled as Royal Highnesses but simply as Highnesses per the Danish court. From 1 January 2023 all four of his children are known as His or Her Excellency Count/Countess of Monpezat. They no longer hold a princely title. Joachim expressed his sadness at his mother's decision to make that change.

== Interests ==
Joachim enjoys historic motor sports car racing and has participated in the Copenhagen Historic Grand Prix multiple times.

In 2019, Joachim presented the documentary series Prins Joachim fortæller for Danmarks Radio. In the six-part series that he also co-produced, Joachim investigates the ideas and events that shaped Denmark's history.

== Titles, styles, honours and arms ==
Coat of arms of Prince Joachim of Denmark
- Armiger: Prince Joachim of Denmark

Joachim's monogram

=== Titles and styles ===
- 7 June 1969 – 29 April 2008: His Royal Highness Prince Joachim of Denmark
- 29 April 2008 – present: His Royal Highness Prince Joachim of Denmark, Count of Monpezat

=== Military ranks ===
Denmark

- (Denmark) 1988: Sergeant
- (Denmark) 1989: Second lieutenant of the reserve
- (Denmark) 1990: First lieutenant of the reserve
- (Denmark) 1992: Captain of the reserve
- (Denmark) 2005: Major of the reserve
- (Denmark) 2011: Lieutenant-Colonel of the reserve
- (Denmark) 2015: Colonel of the reserve
- (Denmark) 2020: Brigadier General

=== Honours ===
==== National ====
===== Orders and appointments =====
- 14 January 1972: Knight of the Order of the Elephant (R.E.)
- 16 April 2004: Grand Commander of the Order of the Dannebrog (S.Kmd.)

===== Medals and decorations =====
- Recipient of the Silver Anniversary Medal of Queen Margrethe II and Prince Henrik (10 June 1992)
- Recipient of the Silver Jubilee Medal of Her Majesty The Queen (14 January 1997)
- Recipient of the Commemorative 75th Birthday Medal of His Royal Highness The Prince Consort (11 June 2009)
- Recipient of the Commemorative 70th Birthday Medal of Her Majesty The Queen (16 April 2010)
- Recipient of the Commemorative Ruby Jubilee Medal of Her Majesty The Queen (14 January 2012)
- Recipient of the Commemorative 75th Birthday Medal of Her Majesty The Queen (16 April 2015)
- Recipient of the Golden Anniversary Medal of Queen Margrethe II and Prince Henrik (10 June 2017)
- Recipient of the Prince Henrik's Commemorative Medal (11 June 2018)
- Recipient of the Commemorative 80th Birthday Medal of Her Majesty The Queen (16 April 2020)
- Recipient of the Commemorative Golden Jubilee Medal of Queen Margrethe II (14 January 2022)

==== Foreign ====
He has been honoured with:

- Belgium: Grand Cross of the Order of the Crown
- Brazil: Grand Cross of the Order of the Southern Cross
- Bulgaria: First Class of the Order of the Balkan Mountains (2006)
- Finland: Grand Cross of the Order of the White Rose of Finland
- France: Grand Officer of the Order of the Legion of Honour
- Germany: Grand Cross 1st Class of the Order of Merit of the Federal Republic of Germany
- Greece: Grand Cross of the Order of the Phoenix
- Iceland: Grand Cross of the Order of the Falcon
- Japan: Knight Grand Cordon of the Order of the Chrysanthemum
- Jordan: Grand Cordon of the Supreme Order of the Renaissance
- Luxembourg: Grand Cross of the Order of Adolphe of Nassau
- Mexico: Sash of the Order of the Aztec Eagle
- Nepal: Member of the Order of the Three Divine Powers (13 October 1989)
- Netherlands: Grand Cross of the Order of the Crown (17 March 2015)
- Norway: Grand Cross of the Order of Saint Olav
- Romania: Grand Cross of the Order of the Star of Romania
- Spain: Knight Grand Cross of the Order of Civil Merit (24 October 2023)
- Sweden: Commander Grand Cross of the Order of the Polar Star

== Additional information ==
The Dansk Rugby Union (DRU) website names Prince Joachim as the patron of the DRU. He participated in a classic-car race, part of the GTC-TC championship: he drove a BMW 2002, sharing the ride with Derek Bell.

Prince Joachim of Denmark Born: 7 June 1969
Lines of succession
Preceded by Princess Josephine of Denmark	Succession to the Danish throne 5th position	Succeeded by Count Nikolai of Monpezat
