= Patrick Anson, 5th Earl of Lichfield =

English photographer (1939–2005)

The Right Honourable The Earl of Lichfield DL
- Lichfield in 1986
- Born: 25 April 1939
- Died: 11 November 2005 (aged 66); John Radcliffe Hospital, Oxford
- Occupation: Photographer
- Years active: 1962–2005
- Spouse: Lady Leonora Grosvenor (m. 1975; div. 1986)
- Children: Lady Rose Anson; Thomas Anson, 6th Earl of Lichfield; Lady Eloise Waymouth
- Parents: Thomas Anson, Viscount Anson (father); Anne Bowes-Lyon (mother)

Thomas Patrick John Anson, 5th Earl of Lichfield (25 April 1939 – 11 November 2005), was an English photographer from the Anson family. He inherited the Earldom of Lichfield in 1960 from his paternal grandfather. In his professional practice he was known as Patrick Lichfield.

== Biography ==
Arms of the Anson family, Earls of Lichfield

Thomas Patrick John Anson was born on 25 April 1939. He was the only son of Lieutenant-Colonel Thomas William Arnold Anson, Viscount Anson (1913–1958), the eldest son and heir apparent of Thomas Edward Anson, 4th Earl of Lichfield (1883–1960). His mother was born Anne Bowes-Lyon (1917–1980), a niece of Queen Elizabeth the Queen Mother. His parents divorced in 1948, and his mother subsequently became Princess Anne of Denmark after her remarriage to Prince Georg of Denmark in 1950. He had one sister, Lady Elizabeth Georgiana Anson (1941–2020), who married Sir Geoffrey Adam Shakerley, 6th Baronet.

Lichfield was educated at two boarding independent schools: Wellesley House School in the coastal town of Broadstairs in Kent, and Harrow School on Harrow on the Hill in north-west London, followed by the Royal Military Academy Sandhurst.

His father died in 1958, leaving Patrick to succeed as 5th Earl of Lichfield when his grandfather died in 1960.

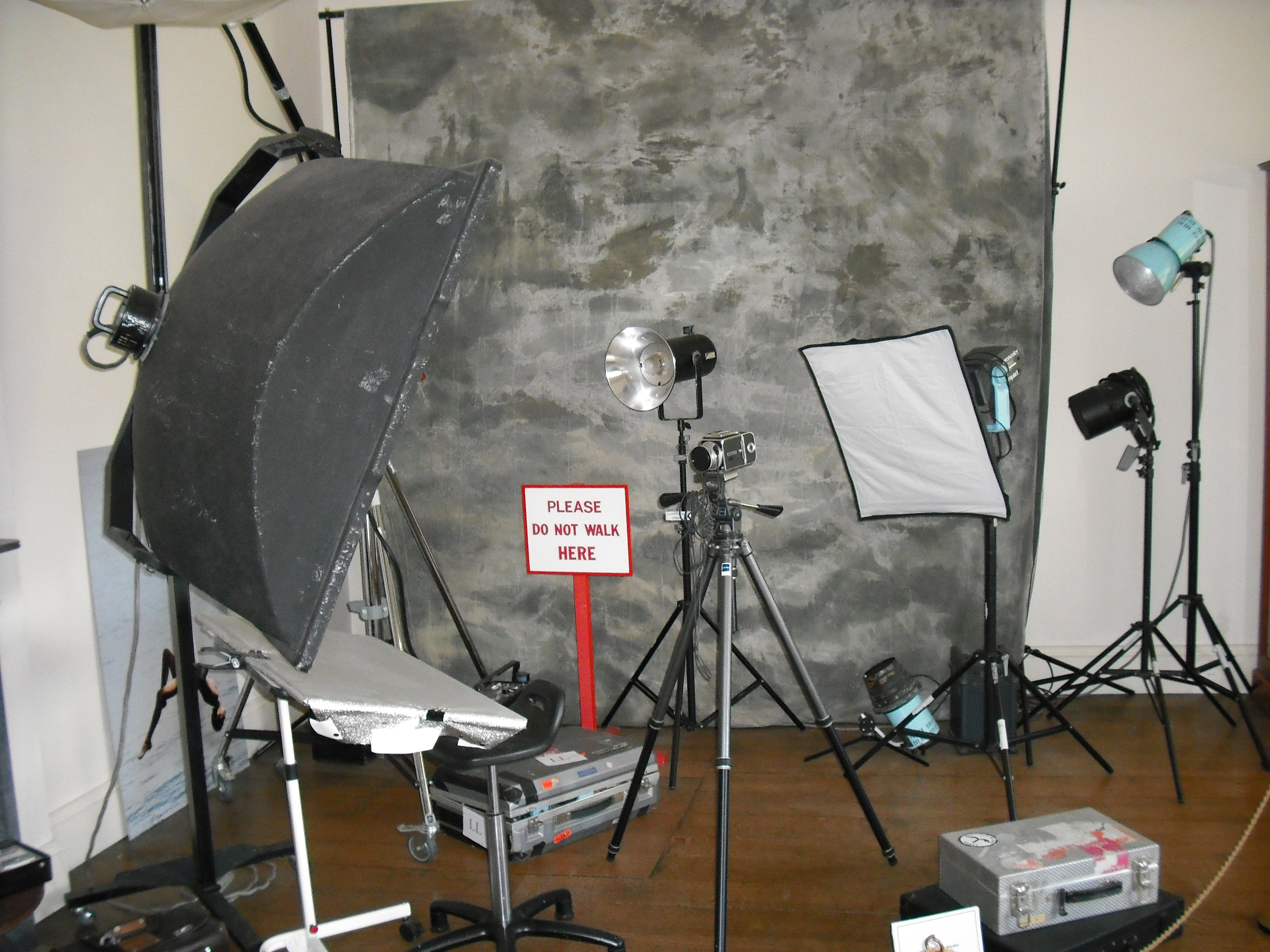
Part of the exhibition of Lichfield's work, at Shugborough Hall

Lichfield joined the Grenadier Guards in 1959. On leaving the Army in 1962, he began to work as a photographer's assistant, and built up his own reputation, partly as a result of having access to the Royal Family. He was selected to take the official photographs of the wedding of the Prince and Princess of Wales in 1981, and subsequently became one of the UK's best-known photographers. From 1999 onwards he was a pioneer of digital photography as a professional standard. He was chosen by Queen Elizabeth II and the Duke of Edinburgh to take official pictures of her Golden Jubilee in 2002.

In 2003, he made a cameo appearance in the BBC medical drama series Casualty for a story about raising money for Children in Need. He also cameoed in the British sitcom Keeping Up Appearances, appearing in the episode "Sea Fever" as a passenger on the Queen Elizabeth 2.

Lichfield resided in an apartment at the former family seat of Shugborough Hall, near Cannock Chase in Staffordshire. In 1960 he had given the estate to the National Trust in lieu of death duties arising on his grandfather's death. In 1996, he was appointed a deputy lieutenant of Staffordshire.

== Marriage and children ==
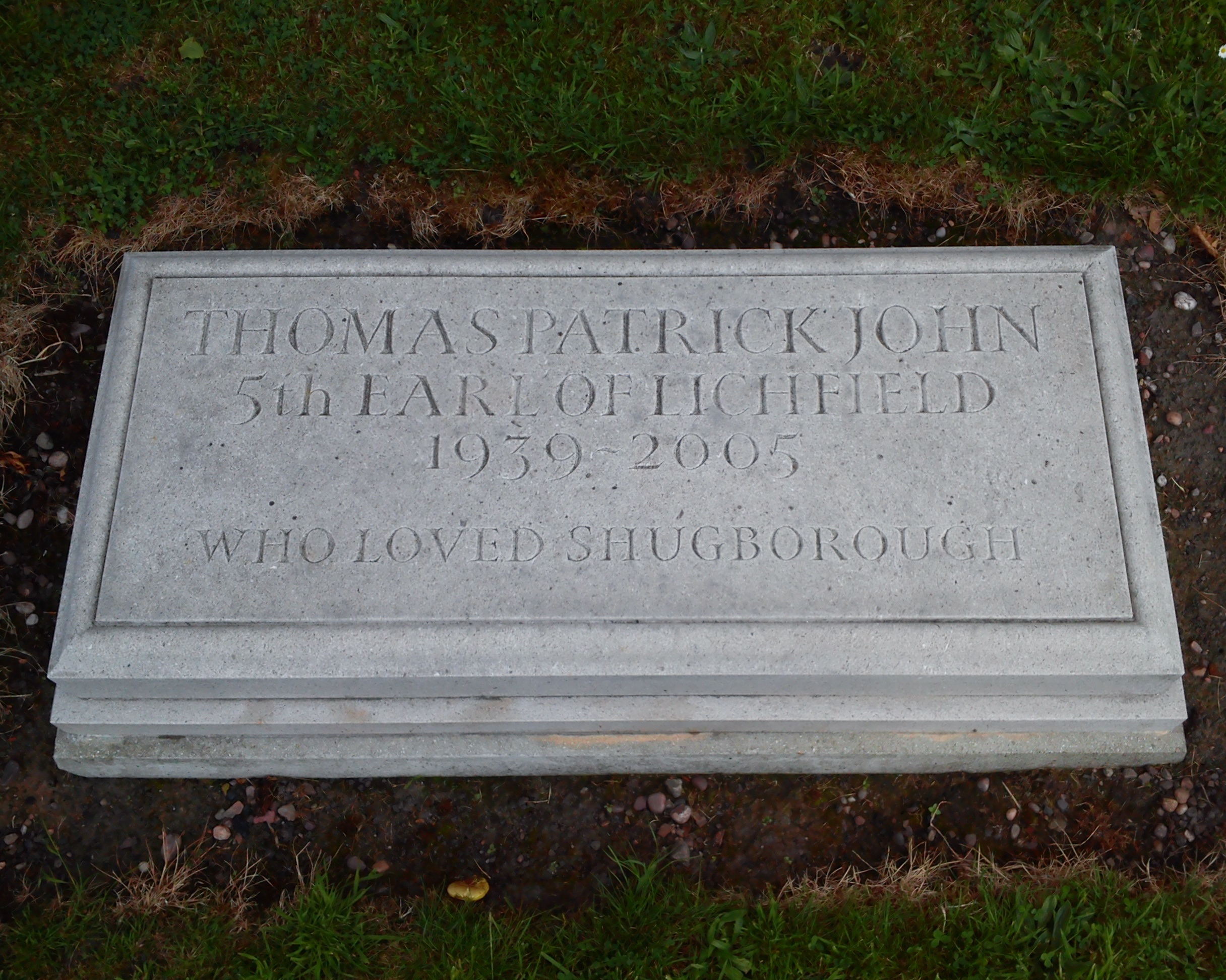
Memorial stone, outside Colwich parish church, placed by Lady Annunziata Asquith

On 8 March 1975 Lichfield married Lady Leonora Grosvenor, elder daughter of Robert Grosvenor, 5th Duke of Westminster and Hon. Viola Lyttelton. They were divorced in 1986. The Countess of Lichfield has not remarried and has retained her title. She and the Earl had one son and two daughters together:

- Lady Rose Meriel Margaret Anson (born 27 July 1976), a goddaughter of Princess Margaret
- Thomas William Robert Hugh Anson, 6th Earl of Lichfield (born 19 July 1978); he married Lady Henrietta Conyngham, daughter of Henry Conyngham, 8th Marquess Conyngham, in December 2009. They have two sons and one daughter.
  - Thomas Ossian Patrick Wolfe Anson, Viscount Anson (20 May 2011)
  - The Honourable Finnish Robert Anson (12 August 2014)
  - Lady Willow Viola Anson (2017)
- Lady Eloise Anne Elizabeth Anson (born 1981); she married Louis Alexander Philip Waymouth on 7 September 2013. They have two children.
  - Iris Waymouth (2015)
  - Cosmo Waymouth (18 September 2017)

Lichfield's most recent partner was the biographer Lady Annunziata Asquith, daughter of Julian Asquith, 2nd Earl of Oxford and Asquith.

== Death ==
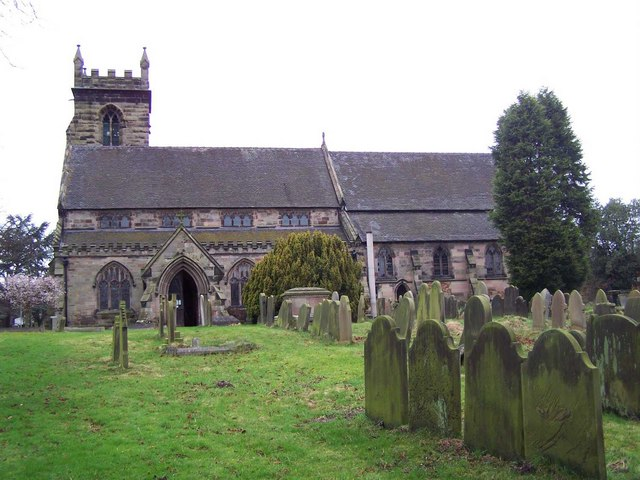
St Michael and All Angels, Colwich

On 10 November 2005, Lichfield suffered a major stroke and died the following day at the John Radcliffe Hospital in Oxford. He was 66 years old. His funeral was held on 21 November at St Michael and All Angels Church, Colwich, Staffordshire, where he was buried in the family vault.

Lichfield's apartment at Shugborough now houses an exhibition of his work, together with a recreation of his studio.

== Bibliography ==
- Lichfield on Photography. London: Collins, 1981.
- The Most Beautiful Women. London: Elm Tree, 1981.
- A Royal Album. London: Elm Tree, 1982.
- Creating the Unipart Calendar. London: Collins, 1983.
- Hotfoot to Zabriskie Point (with Jilly Cooper). London: Constable, 1985.
- Not the Whole Truth: an autobiography. London: Constable, 1986.
- Lichfield on Travel Photography. London: Constable, 1986.

Peerage of the United Kingdom
Preceded by Thomas Anson	Earl of Lichfield; 1960–2005	Succeeded by Thomas Anson
