= St Paul's Walden Bury =

English country house

Coordinates: 51°52′52″N 0°16′34″W

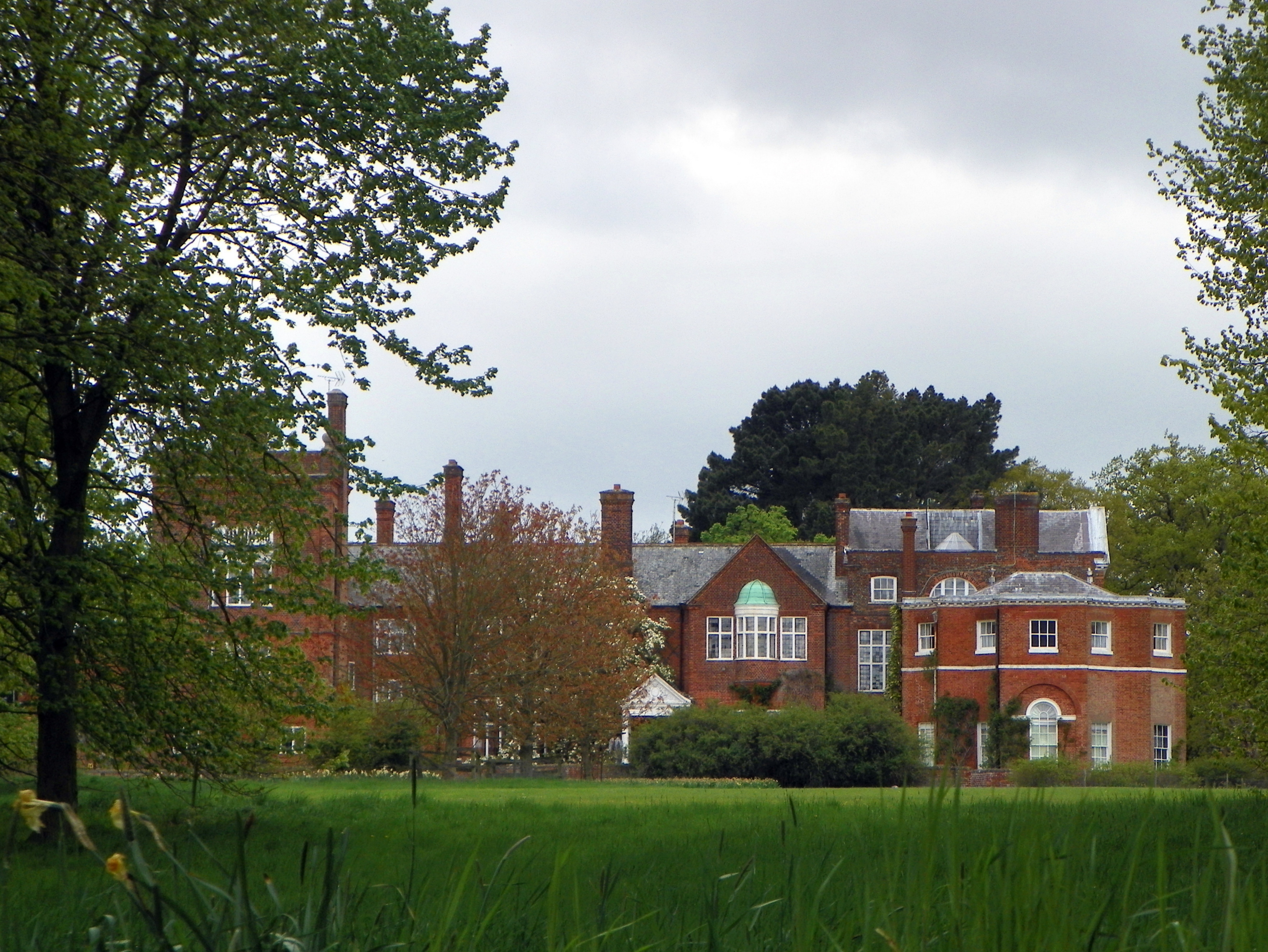
St Paul's Walden Bury

St. Paul's Walden Bury is an English country house and surrounding gardens in the village of St Paul's Walden in Hertfordshire. The house is a Grade II* listed, and the gardens Grade I. The estate has been in the possession of the Bowes or Bowes-Lyon family since 1720. It is possibly the site of the birth of Queen Elizabeth the Queen Mother.

The garden wilderness, or highly formalised woodland, is a very rare survival, and the "most perfect surviving" English example. It was laid out in the 1730s with straight walks in the old formal style, when these were already becoming rather unfashionable.

The house, of red brick with stone dressings and slate roofs, was built around the 1730s for Edward Gilbert (1680–1762). His daughter Mary married George Bowes of Gibside, Durham, and James Paine made alterations to the house in the 1770s. The house was extended to the rear in the late nineteenth century.

== Gardens ==
The St Paul's Walden Bury gardens' design is largely contemporary with the house, with additional 19th and 20th-century woodland garden areas. Geoffrey Jellicoe (1900–1996), the landscape designer, restored and "improved" the 18th-century work. In 1987 the gardens were designated Grade I on the Register of Historic Parks and Gardens of Special Historic Interest in England.

The garden is notable for one of the best surviving formal wildernesses. There are three straight grassed allées radiating in patte d'oie ("goose foot") formation from the garden front of the house. Each allée is flanked by clipped beech hedges. In the 1950s a circular temple designed by James Wyatt was rescued and brought here from Copped Hall, Essex, when that house burned down. There are a number of other garden buildings and statues, some 18th-century, and an 18th-century walled kitchen garden, nearly square and divided in two parts by a further wall.
