= Prince Georg of Denmark =

Danish diplomat and prince (1920–1986)

Prince Georg
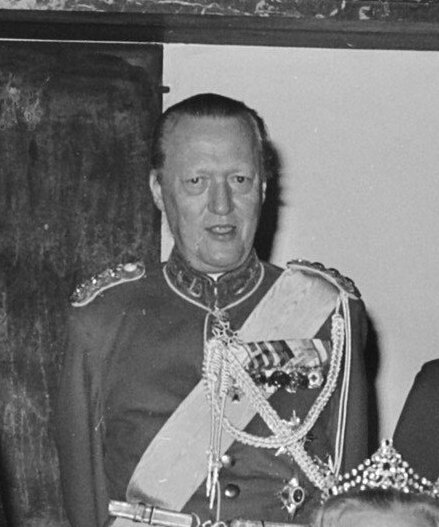
- Georg in 1975
- Born: 16 April 1920; Bernstorff Palace, Gentofte, Denmark
- Died: 29 September 1986 (aged 66); Copenhagen, Denmark
- Burial: Bernstorff Palace, Gentofte, Denmark
- Spouse: Anne, Viscountess Anson (m. 1950; died 1980)
Names
- Georg Valdemar Carl Axel
- House: Glücksburg
- Father: Prince Axel of Denmark
- Mother: Princess Margaretha of Sweden

Prince Georg of Denmark (Georg Valdemar Carl Axel; 16 April 1920 – 29 September 1986) was a Danish diplomat and member of the Danish royal family as a great-grandson of Christian IX.

He served as military attaché at the Danish embassies in London, Paris, Bern and the Hague.

== Early life and family ==
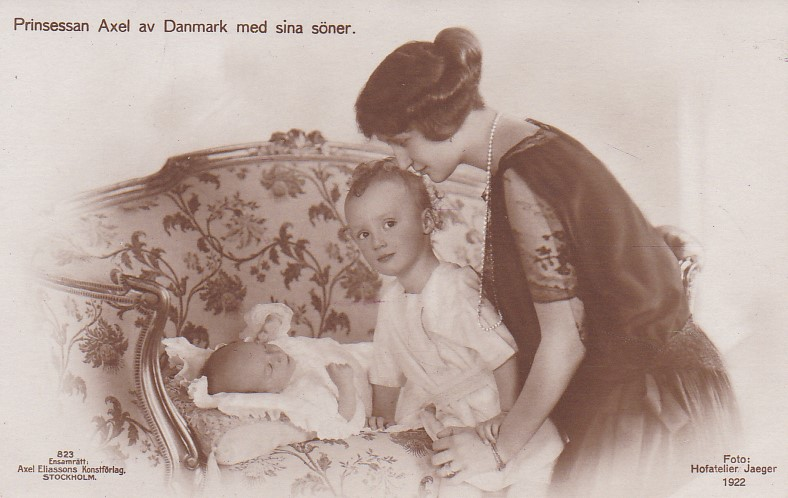
Georg, centre, with his mother and brother, 1923

Georg was born at Bernstorff Palace, the summer residence of his paternal grandfather Prince Valdemar, on 16 April 1920. He was the elder son of Prince Axel of Denmark and Princess Margaretha of Sweden. Through his father, he was a second cousin of Frederik IX, Olav V, George VI, Prince Philip, Duke of Edinburgh, and Alexei Nikolaevich, Tsarevich of Russia. Through his mother, he was a first cousin of Harald V, Baudouin of Belgium and Albert II of Belgium.

Georg was christened wearing a gown made for the occasion by his maternal grandmother, Princess Ingeborg, Duchess of Västergötland. It subsequently became one of the Norwegian royal family's royal christening gowns.

== Career ==
Georg received a military education at Jægersborg Barracks. An officer in the Royal Life Guards, he was active in the Danish resistance movement during German occupation of Denmark in World War II. After the war, he worked for the International Red Cross, aiding his cousin Folke Bernadotte's mission to return Scandinavian prisoners from German concentration camps.

Georg served as military attaché at the Embassy of Denmark, London, from 1948 to 1969. From 1953, he also served as defence attaché to France, and from 1955 to 1961 as military and air attaché to Switzerland. In 1969, he was appointed defence attaché to the United Kingdom and the Netherlands, retiring from the Danish diplomatic service in 1982. In London, he served has chairman of the Association of Military Attachés.

By 1970, Georg had reached the rank of colonel in the Royal Danish Army. In 1975, he was appointed honorary colonel of the 5th Battalion, Queen's Regiment.

== Marriage ==
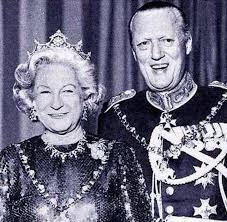
Georg and Anne, c. 1970

On 16 September 1950, at Glamis Castle, Georg married Anne, Viscountess Anson (née Bowes-Lyon), a niece of Queen Elizabeth. Anne was a first cousin of Elizabeth II, while Georg was a second cousin of George VI and Prince Philip, Duke of Edinburgh.

At the time, Danish princes who married commoners ordinarily forfeited their princely titles and places in the line of succession, receiving instead the title Count of Rosenborg, as had occurred when Georg's younger brother, Prince Flemming, married Ruth Nielsen in 1949. Unlike his brother, Georg petitioned his second cousin, Frederik IX, for permission to retain his princely title and rank. According to one account, George VI intervened on behalf of his niece, remarking to the Danish king that "if a Bowes-Lyon was good enough for me, a Bowes-Lyon is surely good enough for one of your princes". Frederik IX subsequently granted his consent, allowing Georg to retain his title and rank, while Anne was recognized as a Princess of Denmark.

As Anne was divorced, the marriage was opposed by the Church of England and the Scottish Episcopal Church. Although Queen Elizabeth initially intended to attend the wedding, Geoffrey Fisher, Archbishop of Canterbury, advised against her attendance, and the Scottish Episcopal clergyman who had been expected to officiate withdrew from the ceremony. Instead, the Queen and Princess Margaret attended the wedding breakfast and remained in an adjoining drawing room during the ceremony. The marriage was solemnized by the Rev. Mogens Buch, pastor of the Danish Seamen's Mission Church in Newcastle upon Tyne, while the Rev. Canon H. G. G. Rorison, chaplain to the Earl of Strathmore, read the lesson after being prohibited by the Anglican authorities from officiating at the service.

== Later life ==
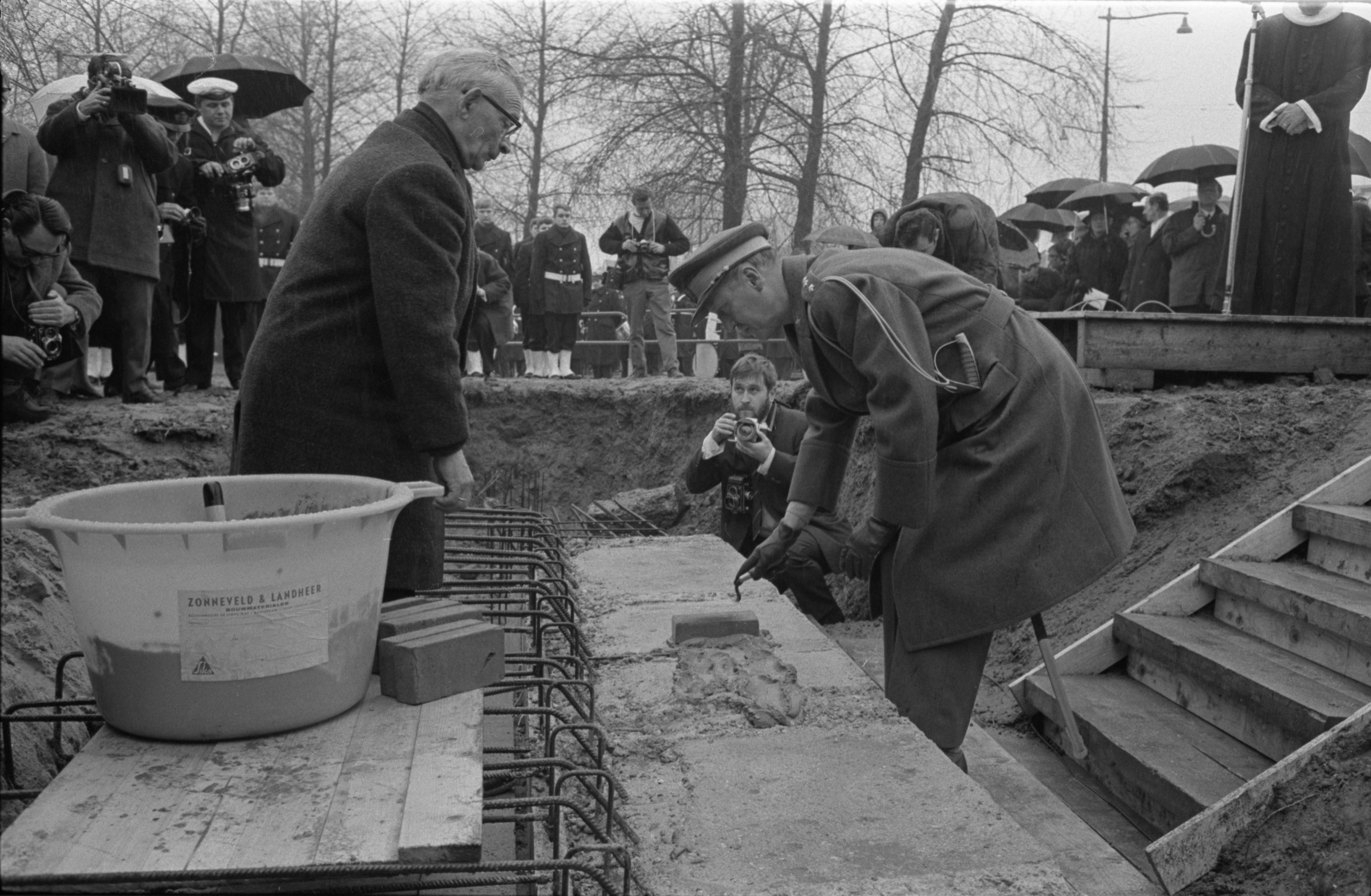
Georg laying the cornerstone of the Danish Seamen's Church in Rotterdam, 1969

As a result of the Act of Succession of 1953, which restricted succession to the throne to the descendants of Christian X and Alexandrine of Mecklenburg-Schwerin through approved marriages, Georg lost his place in the line of succession. His Danish title was simultaneously changed from Prins til Danmark ("Prince to Denmark") to Prins af Danmark ("Prince of Denmark").

Georg represented the King of Denmark at the state funeral of John F. Kennedy in 1963 and the state funeral of Dwight D. Eisenhower in 1969.

Georg died in Copenhagen on 29 September 1986, aged 66. His funeral was held at Holmen Church on 6 October. He was buried beside his wife and parents in the grounds of Bernstorff Palace. A memorial service was held at Westminster Abbey on 1 December.

His will was sealed in London after his death, and his estate was valued at £785,000 (equivalent to approximately £1.8 million in 2022).

== Honours ==
- Denmark: Knight of the Order of the Elephant (16 April 1938)
- Finland: Grand Cross of the Order of the White Rose of Finland
- France: Commander of the Legion of Honour
- Netherlands: Grand Officer of the Order of Orange-Nassau
- Norway: Grand Cross of the Order of Saint Olav
- United Kingdom: Knight Commander of the Royal Victorian Order

== Ancestry ==
Ancestors of Prince Georg of Denmark

8. Christian IX of Denmark
4. Prince Valdemar of Denmark
9. Princess Louise of Hesse-Kassel
2. Prince Axel of Denmark
10. Prince Robert, Duke of Chartres
5. Princess Marie of Orléans
11. Princess Françoise of Orléans
1. Prince Georg of Denmark
12. Oscar II of Sweden
6. Prince Carl, Duke of Västergötland
13. Princess Sophia of Nassau
3. Princess Margaretha of Sweden
14. Frederick VIII of Denmark
7. Princess Ingeborg of Denmark
15. Princess Louise of Sweden

Military offices
| Preceded by The Duke of Norfolk | Honorary Colonel of the 5th Battalion, Queen's Regiment; 1975–1986 | Succeeded by Robin Leigh-Pemberton |
