= List of Americans who married foreign royalty and nobility =

This list includes United States citizens who married members of foreign noble or royal families, including deposed and formerly aristocratic houses.

Throughout history, particularly in the 19th century, advantageous marriages were made between American heiresses and European aristocrats, especially British peers. These women were often referred to as "Dollar princesses" in the press. There were 454 marriages between Gilded Age and Progressive Era American women and European aristocrats.

== American citizens born in the United States ==
Name	Title after marriage	Birthplace	Spouse	Country	Dates	Ref.	Image
Elizabeth Patterson		Baltimore, Maryland	Prince Jérôme Bonaparte (Note: Made a Prince of the Empire after his marriage was annulled, already a member of the nobility)	France	December 24, 1803 – October 1806 (annulled)		
Annis Harding	Baroness von Eberstein	Chocowinity, North Carolina	Baron William Henry von Eberstein	Germany	April 1852 – October 20, 1890 (his death)		
Mary Phinney	Baroness von Olnhausen	Lexington, Massachusetts	Baron Gustav Adolph von Olnhausen	Germany	May 1, 1858 – 1860 (his death)		
Agnes Leclerc Joy	Princess of Salm-Salm	Franklin, Vermont	Prince Felix of Salm-Salm	Germany	August 30, 1862 – August 18, 1870 (his death)		
Antoinette Van Leer Polk	Baroness de La Contrie	Nashville, Tennessee	Athanase Charette, Baron de la Contrie	France	October 30, 1865		
Catherine Willis Gray	Princess Murat	Fredericksburg City, Virginia	Prince Achille Murat	France; Naples	1826 - 1847 (his death)		
Franklin Seaver Pratt		Boston, Massachusetts	Princess Elizabeth Kekaʻaniau	Hawaii	April 27, 1864 – January 11, 1894 (his death)		
Elizabeth Beers-Curtis	Marquise de Talleyrand Duchess de Dino	New York City, New York	Charles Maurice Camille de Talleyrand-Périgord, 4th Duke of Dino, 2nd Marquis de Talleyrand	France; Naples	1867–1886 (divorce)		
Adele Livingston Sampson	Marquise de Talleyrand Duchess de Dino	New York City, New York	Charles Maurice Camille de Talleyrand-Périgord, 4th Duke of Dino, 2nd Marquis de Talleyrand	France; Naples	1887–1903 (divorce)		
Mary Stevens	Lady Paget	New York City, New York	Sir Arthur Henry Fitzroy Paget	United Kingdom	1878–1919 (her death)		
Frances Ellen Work	The Honourable Mrs. James Roche	New York City, New York	The Honourable James Roche	United Kingdom	1880 – 1891 (divorce)		
Florence Emily Sharon	Lady Hesketh	Virginia City, Nevada	Sir Thomas George Fermor-Hesketh, 7th Baronet	United Kingdom	1880 – 1924 (his death)		
Jeanette Jerome	Lady Randolph Spencer-Churchill	New York, New York	Lord Randolph Spencer-Churchill	United Kingdom	15 April 1874 – 24 January 1895 (his death)		
Consuelo Yznaga	Duchess of Manchester	New York, New York	George Montagu, 8th Duke of Manchester	United Kingdom	May 22, 1876 – August 18, 1892 (his death)		
Frances Lawrance	Baroness Vernon	New York, New York	George Venables-Vernon, 7th Baron Vernon	United Kingdom	(1885–1898)		
Winnaretta Singer	Princess de Scey-Montbéliard	Yonkers, New York	Prince Louis de Scey-Montbéliard	France	(1887–1892)		
Winnaretta Singer	Princess de Polignac	Yonkers, New York	Prince Edmond de Polignac	France	(1893–1901)		
Rosalie Van Zandt	Princess Ruspoli	Bloomingdale, New York	Prince Paolo Ruspoli	Italy; Vatican City	1888		
Emily Anne Lothrop	Baroness von Hoyningen-Huene		Baron Barthold Theodor Hermann von Hoyningen-Huene	Germany; Russia			
John Owen Dominis	Prince consort of Hawaiʻi	Schenectady, New York	Lili'uokalani	Hawaii	January 29, 1891 – August 27, 1891 (his death)		
Anna Gould	Countess of Castellane	New York City	Boni de Castellane, Comte de Castellane	France	March 14, 1895–1906 (divorce)		
Anna Gould	Duchess of Sagan	New York City	Hélie de Talleyrand-Périgord, Duke of Sagan	Poland	1908–1937 (his death)		
Consuelo Vanderbilt	Duchess of Marlborough	New York City	Charles Spencer-Churchill, 9th Duke of Marlborough	United Kingdom	November 6, 1895 – 1921 (divorce)		
Jane Allen Campbell	Princess of San Faustino	Montclair, New Jersey	Carlo Bourbon del Monte, Prince di San Faustino	Italy; Vatican City	June 7, 1897		
Bettina Riddle	Baroness von Hutten	Erie, Pennsylvania	Baron Karl Augustn von Hutten zum Stolzenberg	Germany	1897–1909 (divorce)		
Alice Heine	Duchess of Richelieu	New Orleans, Louisiana	Armand Chapelle de Jumilhac, 7th Duke of Richelieu	France	1875–1880 (his death)		
Alice Heine	Princess consort of Monaco	New Orleans, Louisiana	Albert I of Monaco	Monaco	October 30, 1889 – 26 June 1922 (his death)		
Emma Riley Livermore	Baroness de Seillière	Newport, Rhode Island	Baron Raymond de Seillière	France	1891–1892 (his death)		
Mary Leiter	Baroness Curzon of Kedleston	Chicago, Illinois	George Curzon, Baron Curzon of Kedleston	United Kingdom	April 22, 1895 – July 18, 1906 (her death)		
Julia Grant	Princess Cantacuzène, Countess Speransky	Washington, D.C.	Prince Mikhail Cantacuzène	Russia	September 24, 1899 – October 27, 1934 (divorce)		
Helena Zimmerman	Duchess of Manchester	Cincinnati, Ohio	William Montagu, 9th Duke of Manchester	United Kingdom	1900–1931 (divorce)		
Helena Zimmerman	Countess of Kintore	Cincinnati, Ohio	Arthur Keith-Falconer, 10th Earl of Kintore	United Kingdom	1937–1966 (his death)		
Mary Goelet	Duchess of Roxburghe	New York, New York	Henry Innes-Ker, 8th Duke of Roxburghe	United Kingdom	November 10, 1903 – 29 September 1932 (his death)		
Alberta Sturges	Countess of Sandwich	Chicago, Illinois	George Montagu, 9th Earl of Sandwich	United Kingdom	July 25, 1905 – October 23, 1951 (her death)		
Nancy Langhorne Shaw	Viscountess Astor	Danville, Virginia	Waldorf Astor, 2nd Viscount Astor (inherited title after marriage)	United Kingdom	May 1906 – September 30, 1952 (his death)		
Helen Stuyvesant Morton	Duchess de Valençay	New York City, New York	Paul Louis Marie Archambault Boson de Talleyrand-Périgord, Duke de Valençay	France	1901–1904 (divorce)		
Jennie Enfield Berry Bruton	Princess Ruspoli	Etowah County, Alabama	Prince Enrico Ruspoli	Italy; Vatican City	March 2, 1901–1909 (his death)		
Albert Pierce Taylor		St. Louis, Missouri	High Chiefess Emma Ahuena Taylor	Hawaii	November 5, 1902 – January 12, 1931 (his death)		
Constance Livermore	Countess de Lubersac		Count Odom de Lubersac	France	1903		
Mary Elsie Moore	Princess di Civitella-Cesi	Brooklyn, New York	Marino Torlonia, 4th Prince of Civitella-Cesi	Italy	1907 – 1928 (divorce)		
Anita Rhinelander Stewart	Princess of Braganza	Elberon, New Jersey	Prince Miguel of Braganza, Duke of Viseu	Portugal	September 15, 1909		
Anita Rhinelander Stewart	Duchess of Viseu	Elberon, New Jersey	Prince Miguel of Braganza, Duke of Viseu	Portugal	September 15, 1909		
Margaretta Drexel	Countess of Winchilsea and Nottingham	Philadelphia, Pennsylvania	Guy Finch-Hatton, 14th Earl of Winchilsea and 9th Earl of Nottingham	United Kingdom	June 8, 1910 – February 10, 1939 (his death)		
Nevada Stoody Hayes	Duchess of Porto	Sandyville, Ohio	Afonso of Braganza, Infante of Portugal, Duke of Porto	Portugal	September 26, 1917		
Nonie May Stewart	Princess of Greece and Denmark	Zanesville, Ohio	Prince Christopher of Greece and Denmark	Greece and Denmark	February 1, 1920 – August 29, 1923 (her death)		
Kay Sage	Princess of San Faustino	Albany, New York	Ranieri Bourbon del Monte Santa Maria, Prince of San Faustino	Italy; Vatican City	March 30, 1925 – 1936 (annulment)		
Caroline Georgina Fraser	Princess Murat	Charleston, South Carolina	Lucien, Prince Murat, Prince of Pontecorvo	France; Naples; Pontecorvo	August 18 1831 - April 10 1878 (his death)		
Anne Catherine Tredick Wendell	Countess of Carnarvon	Portsmouth, New Hampshire	Henry Herbert, 6th Earl of Carnarvon	United Kingdom	July 17, 1922 – 1936 (divorce)		
Anita Lihme	Princess de Lobkowicz	Chicago, Illinois	Prince Edouard Josef de Lobkowicz	Austria	August 29, 1925 – January 1959 (his death)		
Armand Hammer		New York City, New York	Baroness Olga von Root	Russia	1927–1943 (divorce)		
Aimée Freeland Ellis	Baroness von Hoyningen-Huene	Hartford, Connecticut	Baron Heinrich von Hoyningen-Huene	Germany Russia	1928 – 1941 (his death)		
Barbara Hutton	Madame Mdivani	New York City, New York	Alexis Mdivani	Georgia	1933–1935 (divorce)		
Barbara Hutton	Countess von Haugwitz-Reventlow	New York City, New York	Count Kurt von Haugwitz-Reventlow	Germany	1935–1938 (divorce)		
Barbara Hutton	Princess Trubetskoy	New York City, New York	Prince Igor Troubetzkoy	Russia	1947–1951 (divorce)		
Barbara Hutton	Baroness von Cramm	New York City, New York	Baron Gottfried von Cramm	Germany	1955–1959 divorce)		
Barbara Hutton	Princess Doan	New York City, New York	Prince Pierre Doan	Laos	1964–1966 (divorce)		
Eugene Bowie Roberts		Bowie, Maryland	Countess Cornelia "Gilia" Széchényi de Sárvár-Felsövidék	Hungary	1933–1958		
Alexandra Dalziel	Lady Kinloch		Sir Alexander Davenport Kinloch, 12th Baronet	United Kingdom	September 10, 1929		
Wallis Simpson	Duchess of Windsor	Blue Ridge Summit, Pennsylvania	Prince Edward, Duke of Windsor	United Kingdom	June 3, 1937 – May 28, 1972 (his death)		
Frank Shields		New York City, New York	Princess Marina Torlonia di Civitella-Cesi	Italy	1940–1950 (divorce)		
Kathleen Kennedy	Marchioness of Hartington	Brookline, Massachusetts	William Cavendish, Marquess of Hartington	United Kingdom	May 6, 1944 – September 9, 1944 (his death)		
Genia Pauline Hindes	Baroness Haden-Guest	New York City, New York	Peter Haden-Guest, 4th Baron Haden-Guest	United Kingdom	1945 – 1996 (his death)		
Aline Griffith	Countess of Romanones	Pearl River, New York	Luis Figueroa y Pérez de Guzmán el Bueno, 9th Count of Quintanilla, 3rd Count of Romanones	Spain	1947 – 1987 (his death)		
Frances Lovell Oldham	Lady of Invercauld	Seattle, Washington	Alwyne Arthur Compton Farquharson, Laird of Invercauld and Monaltrie, 16th Chief of Clan Farquharson	Scotland	1949 – 1991 (her death)		
Rita Hayworth	Princess Aly Khan	Brooklyn, New York	Prince Aly Khan	Pakistan	May 27, 1949 – January 1953		
Jean Wallop	Countess of Carnarvon	Big Horn, Wyoming	Henry Herbert, 7th Earl of Carnarvon	United Kingdom	January 7, 1956 – September 11, 2001 (his death)		
Grace Kelly	Princess consort of Monaco	Philadelphia, Pennsylvania	Rainier III, Prince of Monaco	Monaco	April 18, 1956 – September 14, 1982 (her death)		
Genevieve Bothin Lyman Casey	Princess of San Faustino	San Francisco, California	Ranieri Bourbon del Monte, Prince of San Faustino	Italy; Vatican City	1958–1977 (his death)		
Caroline Lee Bouvier	Princess Radziwiłł	Southampton, New York	Prince Stanisław Albrecht Radziwiłł	Poland	March 19, 1959 – 1974 (divorce)		
John E. Francis			Baroness Bigna Antoinette von Wyttenbach	Switzerland	July 25, 1959		
Howard Oxenberg		New York City, New York	Princess Elizabeth of Yugoslavia	Yugoslavia	January 21, 1961 – 1966 (divorce)		
Jane Fasset Nevin	Lady Guinness	New York, New York	Sir Kenelm Guinness, 4th Baronet	United Kingdom	June 3, 1961 – May 6, 2011 (his death)		
Mary Raye Gross	Lady Keith of Castleacre	Salinas, California	Kenneth Keith, Baron Keith of Castleacre	United Kingdom	1962–1972 (separated)		
Norman Mailer		Long Branch, New Jersey	Lady Jeanne Campbell	United Kingdom	1962 – 1963 (divorce)		
Hope Cooke	Queen of Sikkim	San Francisco, California	King Palden Thondup Namgyal	Kingdom of Sikkim	March 20, 1963 – 1980 (divorce)		
Stephen Breyer		San Francisco, California	The Hon. Joanna Hare	United Kingdom	1967 – present		
Peter Ladd Jensen			Princess Ubol Ratana	Thailand	1972–1998 (divorce)		
Virginia Sturm	Lady Tate	Richmond, Virginia	Sir Saxon Tate 5th Baronet	United Kingdom	1975 – 2012 (his death)		
Lisa Halaby	Queen of Jordan	Princeton, New Jersey	Hussein of Jordan	Jordan	June 15, 1978 – February 7, 1999 (his death)		
Christia Ipsen	Princess Romanov	Rockford, Illinois	Prince Rostislav Rostislavovich Romanov	Russia	August 16, 1980 – January 7, 1999 (his death)		
Christia Ipsen	Baroness Ampthill	Rockford, Illinois	David Russell, 5th Baron Ampthill	United Kingdom	July 6, 2002 – present		
Maria Ewing	Lady Hall	Detroit, Michigan	Sir Peter Hall	United Kingdom	1982 – 1990 (divorce)		
Jamie Lee Curtis	Baroness Haden-Guest	Santa Monica, California	Christopher Guest, 5th Baron Haden-Guest (inherited title after marriage)	United Kingdom	1984 – present		
Monica Ann Ford	Baroness von Neumann	Detroit, Michigan	Baron John von Neumann von Héthárs	Hungary	1985–2003 (his death)		
Inez Storer	Princess Romanoff	Santa Monica, California	Prince Andrew Romanoff	Russia	1987 – 2021 (his death)		
Lisa Davis	Cik Puan Nur Lisa Idris Abdullah	San Francisco, California	Sharafuddin of Selangor	Malaysia	1988–1997 (divorce)		
Christopher M. Jeffries			Princess Yasmin Aga Khan	Pakistan	1989–1993 (divorce)		
William Lord Brookfield		United States	The Hon. Dame Hannah Rothschild	United Kingdom	March 7, 1994 – 2000 (divorce)		
Alexandra Miller	Princess of Fürstenberg	New York City, New York	Prince Alexander von Fürstenberg	Germany	October 28, 1995 – 2002 (divorce)		
Luann Nadeau	Countess de Lesseps	Berlin, Connecticut	Alexandre, comte de Lesseps	France	1993–2009 (divorce)		
Deena Aljuhani	Princess of Saudi Arabia	California, United States	Prince Sultan bin Fahad bin Nasser bin Abdulaziz	Saudi Arabia	1998–present		
Carole DiFalco	Princess Radziwiłł	Suffern, New York	Prince Anthony Radziwiłł	Poland	August 27, 1994 – August 10, 1999 (his death)		
Sarah Butler	Princess of Jordan	Houston, Texas	Prince Zeid Raad Al Hussein	Jordan	July 5, 2000–present		
Lynn Forester	Lady de Rothschild	Oradell, New Jersey	Sir Evelyn de Rothschild	United Kingdom	November 30, 2000 – November 7, 2022 (his death)		
Melissa Ann Wheeley	Lady Guinness		Sir Kenelm Edward Lee Guinness, 5th Baronet	United Kingdom	15 April 2001 – present		
Russell Steinberg		New York City, New York	Princess Tatiana von Fürstenberg	Germany	2002–2014 (divorce)		
Aileen Getty		New York City, New York	Prince Bartolomeo Ruspoli	?	2004–present		
Julie Jean Fisher	Countess of Sandwich	Sugar Grove, Illinois	Luke Montagu, 12th Earl of Sandwich	United Kingdom	2004–present		
Allison Joy Langer	Countess of Devon	Columbus, Ohio	Charles Courtenay, 19th Earl of Devon	United Kingdom	2004–present		
Keisha Bolden	Oloori of Ipetu-Ijesha	Inglewood, California	Omoba Adekunle Adebayo Omilana	Nigeria	January 28, 2006–present		
Kelly Rondestvedt	Princess of Saxe-Coburg and Gotha, Duchess of Saxony	Pensacola, Florida	Hubertus, Prince of Saxe-Coburg and Gotha, Duke of Saxony	Germany	May 21, 2009–present		
Rita Jenrette	Princess Ludovisi di Piombino	San Antonio, Texas	Prince Nicolò Boncompagni Ludovisi di Piombino	Italy	May 27, 2009–2018 (his death)		
LeOntra Breeden	Countess von Habsburg-Lothringen	New York City, New York	Count Franz Ferdinand von Habsburg-Lothringen	Austria	May 18, 2013–present		
Charles DeAndre Richardson		Albany, New York	Prince Manvendra Singh Gohil	India	July 2013–present		
Kendra Spears	Princess Salwa Aga Khan	Seattle, Washington	Prince Rahim Aga Khan	Pakistan	August 31, 2013 – February 2022 (divorce)		
Nicky Hilton		New York City, New York	James Amschel Victor Rothschild	United Kingdom	July 10, 2015 – present		
Alejandro Santo Domingo		New York City, New York	Lady Charlotte Wellesley	United Kingdom	May 28, 2016 – present		
Alejandro Santo Domingo		New York City, New York	Lady Charlotte Wellesley	Belgium	May 28, 2016 – present		
Alejandro Santo Domingo		New York City, New York	Lady Charlotte Wellesley	Spain	May 28, 2016 – present		
Alejandro Santo Domingo		New York City, New York	Lady Charlotte Wellesley	The Netherlands	May 28, 2016 – present		
Alejandro Santo Domingo		New York City, New York	Lady Charlotte Wellesley	Portugal	May 28, 2016 – present		
Rishi Roop Singh			Princess Maria Galitzine	Russia	February 10, 2017 – May 4, 2020 (her death)		
Guillermo Sierra y Uribe			Princess Tatiana Galitzine	Russia	April 29, 2017–present		
Jessica Chastain	Countess Passi de Preposulo	Sacramento, California	Count Gian Luca Passi de Preposulo	Italy	June 10, 2017 – present		
Ariana Austin	Princess of Ethiopia	Washington, D.C.	Prince Joel Dawit Makonnen	Ethiopia	September 9, 2017–present		
Veronica Gail Worth			Princess Abigail Kinoiki Kekaulike Kawānanakoa	Hawaii	October 1, 2017 – December 11, 2022 (her death)		
Meghan Markle	Duchess of Sussex	Los Angeles, California	Prince Harry, Duke of Sussex	United Kingdom	May 19, 2018–present		
Meghan Markle	Countess of Dumbarton	Los Angeles, California	Prince Harry, Duke of Sussex	United Kingdom	May 19, 2018–present		
Meghan Markle	Baroness Kilkeel	Los Angeles, California	Prince Harry, Duke of Sussex	United Kingdom	May 19, 2018–present		
Barron Nicholas Hilton II		New York City, New York	Countess Tessa von Walderdorff	Germany	June 1, 2018–present		
Alana Camille Bunte	Princess of Sayn-Wittgenstein-Sayn	Laguna Beach, California	Prince Casimir Sayn-Wittgenstein-Sayn	Germany	2019–present		
Remy W. Trafelet			Lady Melissa Percy	United Kingdom	December 19, 2019–present		
Elisa Garafano			Prince Vacharaesorn Vivacharawongse	Thailand	2020s (divorced)		
Jason Wolf			The Hon. Annie Haden-Guest	United Kingdom	2020 – present		
Ali Parker Kay	Princess of Fürstenberg	Miami, Florida	Prince Alexander von Fürstenberg	Germany	September 19, 2020 – present		
Kei Komuro		United States	Princess Mako of Akishino	Japan	October 26, 2021 – present		
Kynthia			The Hon. Ruby Haden-Guest	United Kingdom	May 2022–present		
Carina Axelsson	Princess of Sayn-Wittgenstein-Berleburg	Northern California, U.S.	Gustav, 7th Prince of Sayn-Wittgenstein-Berleburg	Germany	June 2022–present		
Allison Ecung	Baroness von Arnim	Rome, New York	Raban, Baron von Arnim	Germany	October 2022 –present		
Durek Verrett		Sacramento, California	Princess Märtha Louise of Norway	Norway	August 31, 2024 – present		
Matthew Jeremiah Kumar		California, United States	Princess Theodora of Greece and Denmark	Greece and Denmark	September 28, 2024 – present		

== American citizens born outside the United States ==
There are also individuals who were born outside the United States but maintain US citizenship through an American parent:

Name	Title after marriage	Birthplace	Spouse	Country	Dates	Ref.	Image
Leonie Jerome	Lady Leslie	France (Note: Born in France to American parents Leonard Jerome and Clarissa Hall)	Sir John Leslie, 2nd Baronet	United Kingdom; Ireland	1884–1943 (her death)		
Gladys Deacon	Duchess of Marlborough	Paris, France (Note: Though born in Paris, Gladys Marie Deacon was the daughter of American citizens Edward Parker Deacon and his wife Florence Baldwin.)	Charles Spencer-Churchill, 9th Duke of Marlborough	United Kingdom	1921–1934		
Louise Hollingsworth Morris Clews	Duchess of Argyll	Paris, France (Note: Though born in France, was the daughter of American parents Henry Clews Jr. and Louise Morris.)	Ian Campbell, 11th Duke of Argyll	United Kingdom	1935–1951 (divorce)		
Mathilda Coster Mortimer	Duchess of Argyll	Geneva, Switzerland (Note: Though born in Switzerland, was the daughter of American parents Stanley Mortimer and Mathilda Coster.)	Ian Campbell, 11th Duke of Argyll	United Kingdom	1963–1973, his death		
Marie-Chantal Miller	Crown Princess of Greece, Princess of Denmark	London, England (Note: Though born in London, Marie-Chantal Miller is the daughter of American-born British businessman Robert Warren Miller and his Ecuadorian wife María Clara "Chantal" Pesantes Becerra.)	Pavlos, Crown Prince of Greece	Greece and Denmark	July 1, 1995–present		
Christopher O'Neill	Refused any title, but accepted to become a Commander of the Royal Order of the Polar Star (KNO)	London, England (Note: Though born in London, Christopher O'Neill is the son of American investment banker Paul O'Neill and his wife Eva Walter O'Neill.)	Princess Madeleine, Duchess of Hälsingland and Gästrikland	Sweden	June 8, 2013–present		
Josephine Mary Beers-Curtis	Princess of Poggio Suasa, Princess Ruspoli, Princess of The Holy Roman Empire	Paris, France (Note: Though born in France, was the daughter of American parents Joseph Davis Beers Curtis and Elizabeth Giles.)	Emanuele Ruspoli, 1st Prince of Poggio Suasa	Italy	1885–1899, his death		

== Americans with foreign titles who married other foreign aristocrats ==
Name	Title after marriage	Birthplace	Spouse	Country	Dates	Ref.	Image
Baroness Elizabeth von Hoyningen-Huene	Baroness von Wrangel	Detroit, Michigan	Baron Nikolai Alexandrovitch von Wrangel	Germany; Russia			
Genevieve Garvan	Duchess of the Holy Roman Church	Hartford, Connecticut	Nicholas Frederic Brady, Duke of the Holy Roman Church	Vatican City	August 11, 1906 – March 27, 1930 (his death)		
Nicholas Frederic Brady	Duke of the Holy Roman Church	Albany, New York	Genevieve Garvan, Duchess of the Holy Roman Church	Vatican City	August 11, 1906 – March 27, 1930 (his death)		
The Hon. Anne Bowes-Lyon	Viscountess Anson	Washington, D.C.	Thomas Anson, Viscount Anson	United Kingdom	April 28, 1938–1948 (divorce)		
The Hon. Anne Bowes-Lyon	Princess of Denmark	Washington, D.C.	Prince Georg of Denmark	Denmark	September 16, 1950–September 26, 1980 (her death)		
Princess Nora zu Oettingen-Spielberg	Lady Max Percy	West Palm Beach, Florida	Lord Max Percy	United Kingdom	July 15, 2017–present		

== American spouses of Americans who acquired foreign noble titles ==
Name	Title after marriage	Birthplace	Spouse	Country	Dates	Ref.	Image
Lucien B. Price			Katherine E. Price, Countess of the Holy Roman Church	Vatican City			
Joseph P. Kennedy Sr.		Boston, Massachusetts	Rose Fitzgerald Kennedy, Countess of the Holy Roman Church	Vatican City	October 7, 1914 – November 18, 1969 (his death)		
Yula Webster		Alabama	Faustin E. Wirkus, King of La Gonâve	Haiti	1937–1945 (his death)		

== Naturalized Americans who married foreign nobility ==
Name	Title after marriage	Birthplace	Spouse	Country	Dates	Ref.	Image
Magda Gabor	Countess de Bychowsky	Budapest, Hungary (Note: She was born a Hungarian citizen and later acquired American citizenship)	Count Jan Bychowski	Poland	November 19, 1937 – May 22, 1944 (his death)		
Klára Dán	Madame von Neumann	Budapest, Hungary	John von Neumann	Hungary	1938 – 1957 (his death)		
Jolie Gabor	Countess de Szigethy	Budapest, Austria-Hungary (Note: She was born a Hungarian citizen and later acquired American citizenship)	Count Odon Szigethy	Hungary	March 3, 1957 – September 30, 1989 (his death)		
Diane Simone Michele Halfin	Princess of Fürstenberg	Brussels, Belgium (Note: She was born a Belgian citizen and later acquired American citizenship)	Prince Egon von Fürstenberg	Germany	1969–1983 (divorce)		
Jessica Watson	Oolori Oyelowo of Awe	Ipswich, England (Note: She was born a British citizen and later acquired American citizenship)	Omoba David Oyetokunbo Oyelowo of Awe	Nigeria	1998–present		

== Americans who married untitled members of royal or noble houses ==
Name	Title after marriage	Birthplace	Spouse	House	Dates	Ref.	Image
Susan May Williams		Baltimore, Maryland	Jérôme Napoléon Bonaparte	Bonaparte	November 1829 – June 17, 1870 (his death)		
Caroline Le Roy Appleton		Boston, Massachusetts	Jerome Napoleon Bonaparte II	Bonaparte	September 10, 1871 – September 3, 1893 (his death)		
Ellen Channing Day		Hartford, Connecticut	Charles Joseph Bonaparte	Bonaparte	1875 – 1921 (his death)		

== See also ==
- American royalty
- Dollar princess
- List of Americans who held noble titles from other countries
