= List of Americans who held noble titles from other countries =

This is a list of American citizens who have held titles of nobility from other countries. Nobility is not granted by the United States itself under the Title of Nobility Clause of the Constitution.

== Sovereign ==
- Rama IX, by birth a prince, later ascended to the throne (Thailand)
- Albert II, by birth a prince, later ascended to the throne (Monaco)
- Leo XIV, ex officio, elected to papacy (Vatican City)

== Consorts to Sovereigns ==
- Catherine Willis Gray, Princess Consort Murat (France & Naples)
- John Owen Dominis, Prince consort of Hawaiʻi (Hawaii)
- Alice Heine, Princess Consort of Monaco (Monaco)
- Grace Kelly, Princess Consort of Monaco (Monaco)
- Hope Cooke, Queen Consort of Sikkim (Sikkim)
- Lisa Halaby, Queen Consort of Jordan (Jordan)

== Prince/Princess ==
- Agnes Leclerc Joy, Princess Feilix of Salm-Salm, by marriage (Germany)
- Ariana Austin Makonnen, by marriage (Ethiopian Empire)
- Sarah Culberson, by birth (Sierra Leone)
- Josiah Harlan, Prince of Ghor, ennobled (Emirate of Afghanistan)
- Paul Ilyinsky, by birth (Russia)
- Anne Bowes-Lyon, Princess Georg of Denmark, by marriage (Kingdom of Denmark)
- Lee Radziwill, by marriage (Holy Roman Empire)
- May Stewart, Princess Anastasia of Greece and Denmark, by marriage (Kingdom of Greece & Kingdom of Denmark)
- Prince Hamzah bin Hussein, by birth (Jordan)
- Prince Hashim bin Hussein, by birth (Jordan)
- Princess Iman bint Hussein, by birth (Jordan)
- Princess Raiyah bint Hussein, by birth (Jordan)
- Marie-Chantal, Crown Princess of Greece, by marriage (Denmark & titular Kingdom of Greece)
- Princess Noor Zahra Pahlavi (titular Imperial State of Iran)
- Princess Iman Laya Pahlavi (titular Imperial State of Iran)
- Princess Maria-Olympia of Greece and Denmark by birth (Denmark & titular Kingdom of Greece)
- Prince Constantine-Alexios of Greece and Denmark by birth (Denmark & titular Kingdom of Greece)
- Prince Achileas-Andreas of Greece and Denmark by birth (Denmark & titular Kingdom of Greece)
- Princess Farah Mitra Pahlavi (titular Imperial State of Iran)
- Prince Ra'ad bin Zeid, by birth (Jordan & titular Kingdom of Iraq)
- Princess Hala bint Zeid, by birth (Jordan & titular Kingdom of Iraq)
- Prince Odysseas-Kimon of Greece and Denmark by birth (Denmark & titular Kingdom of Greece)
- Princess Haalah bint Hashim, by birth (Jordan)
- Prince Aristidis-Stavros of Greece and Denmark by birth (Denmark & titular Kingdom of Greece)
- Princess Rayet Al-Noor bint Hashim, by birth (Jordan)
- Kelly Rondestvedt, Princess of Saxe-Coburg and Gotha, by marriage (titular Duchy of Saxe-Coburg and Gotha)
- Princess Fatima Al-Alia bint Hashim, by birth (Jordan)
- Princess Leonore Lilian Maria, Duchess of Gotland, by birth (Sweden)
- Prince Hussein Haidara bin Hashim, by birth (Jordan)
- Prince Nicolas Paul Gustaf, Duke of Ångermanland, by birth (Sweden)
- Princess Ariana Austin Makonnen, by marriage (titularly Ethiopia)
- Princess Adrienne Josephine Alice, Duchess of Blekinge, by birth (Sweden)
- Prince Archie of Sussex by birth (United Kingdom)
- Prince Mohammad Al-Hassan bin Hashim, by birth (Jordan)
- Princess Lilibet of Sussex by birth (United Kingdom)

== Duke/Duchess ==
- Nicholas Frederic Brady and Genevieve Brady, ennobled (Holy See)
- Anna Gould, by marriage (Prussia)
- Consuelo Yznaga, Duchess of Manchester by marriage (United Kingdom)
- Sacha Hamilton, Duchess of Abercorn, by marriage (United Kingdom)
- Wallis Simpson, Duchess of Windsor, by marriage (United Kingdom)
- Consuelo Vanderbilt, Duchess of Marlborough, by marriage (United Kingdom)
- Meghan (Markle), The Princess Henry, Duchess of Sussex, by marriage (United Kingdom)

== Marquis/Marquise ==
- Elizabeth Beers-Curtis, by marriage (Second French Empire)
- Adele Livingston Sampson, by marriage (Second French Empire)
- Grace Curzon, Marchioness Curzon of Kedleston, by marriage (United Kingdom)
- Henry Hathaway, by birth as Henri Léopold, Marquis de Fiennes (Kingdom of Belgium)
- Francis Augustus MacNutt, ennobled (Holy See)
- Medora de Vallombrosa, Marquise de Morès, by marriage (Kingdom of Sardinia)
- Marianne Wellesley, Marchioness Wellesley, by marriage (United Kingdom)

== Count/Countess ==
- Gertrude Gretsch Astor, by marriage (Italy)
- Ethel Beatty, by marriage (United Kingdom)
- Adele Capell, Countess of Essex, by marriage (United Kingdom)
- Clara Longworth de Chambrun, by marriage (Second French Empire)
- Daniel von Coberly von Reichenberg, by inheritance (Holy Roman Empire)
- Elise, Countess of Edla, by marriage (Kingdom of Portugal)
- Mildred, Countess of Gosford, by marriage (United Kingdom)
- Flora Curzon, Lady Howe, by marriage (United Kingdom)
- Rose Kennedy, ennobled (Holy See)
- Helena Keith-Falconer, Countess of Kintore, by marriage (formerly Duchess of Manchester) (United Kingdom)
- A. J. Langer, Countess of Devon, by marriage (United Kingdom)
- Richard Alan Montagu-Stuart-Wortley, 5th Earl of Wharncliffe, by birth
- Cissy Patterson, by marriage (Austria-Hungary)
- Katherine E. Price, ennobled (Holy See)
- Gladys Vanderbilt Széchenyi, by marriage (Austria-Hungary)
- Alice Cornelia Thaw, by marriage (United Kingdom)
- Benjamin Thompson, ennobled (Holy Roman Empire)
- Alberta Montagu, Countess of Sandwich, by marriage (United Kingdom)
- Julie Montagu, Countess of Sandwich, by marriage (United Kingdom)
- Oliver Wallop, 8th Earl of Portsmouth, by inheritance (Great Britain)

== Viscount/Viscountess ==
- Waldorf Astor, 2nd Viscount Astor, by birth (United Kingdom)
- William Waldorf Astor, 1st Viscount Astor, ennobled (United Kingdom)
- Tennessee Claflin, by marriage (Kingdom of Portugal)
- Thelma Furness, Viscountess Furness, by marriage (United Kingdom)

== Baron/Baroness ==
- Annis Harding, Baroness von Eberstein, by marriage (Germany)
- Mary Phinney, Baroness von Olnhausen, by marriage (Germany)
- Antoinette Van Leer Polk, Baroness de La Contrie, by marriage (France)
- Frances Lawrance, Baroness Vernon, by marriage (United Kingdom)
- John Jacob Astor, 1st Baron Astor of Hever, ennobled (United Kingdom)
- John Copley, 1st Baron Lyndhurst, ennobled (United Kingdom)
- Helen Beresford, Baroness Decies, by marriage (United Kingdom)
- Urban Huttleston Broughton, 1st Baron Fairhaven, ennobled (United Kingdom)
- Mary Curzon, Baroness Curzon of Kedleston, by marriage (United Kingdom)
- Elizabeth Wharton Drexel, by marriage (United Kingdom)
- Albert Fairfax, 12th Lord Fairfax of Cameron, by birth (United Kingdom)
- Bryan Fairfax, 8th Lord Fairfax of Cameron, by birth (United Kingdom)
- Charles Fairfax, 10th Lord Fairfax of Cameron, by birth (United Kingdom)
- John Fairfax, 11th Lord Fairfax of Cameron, by birth (United Kingdom)
- Thomas Fairfax, 9th Lord Fairfax of Cameron, by birth (United Kingdom)
- Alexandra Freeman, Baroness Freeman of Steventon, ennobled (United Kingdom)
- Christopher Guest, 5th Baron Haden-Guest, by birth (United Kingdom)
- Jamie Lee Curtis, Lady Haden-Guest by marriage (United Kingdom)
- Taylor Moffitt of Halydean, Baron and Lord of Halydean, ennobled (United Kingdom)
- Thomas Shaughnessy, 1st Baron Shaughnessy, ennobled (United Kingdom)
- Joanna Shields, Baroness Shields, ennobled (United Kingdom)
- Van Watervliet family, by birth and marriage (Republic of the Seven United Netherlands)
- Charles Freiherr von Woodcock-Savage, ennobled (Württemberg)

== Hereditary Knight ==
- Sir James Michael Dunbar, 14th Baronet Dunbar, by birth (United Kingdom)
- Monica von Neumann, by marriage (Austria-Hungary)

== Lord/Lady (Untitled) ==
- Lady Randolph Churchill, by marriage (United Kingdom)
- Pauline Payne Whitney, by marriage (United Kingdom)
- May Yohé, by marriage (United Kingdom)

== See also ==
- List of Americans who married foreign royalty and nobility
