= Lydia Kaʻonohiponiponiokalani Aholo =

American educator (1878–1979)

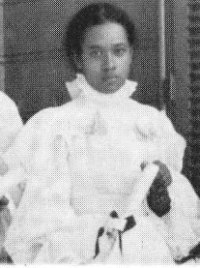
Lydia Aholo in the graduating class Kamehameha School for Girls in 1897

Lydia Kaʻonohiponiponiokalani Aholo (February 6, 1878 – July 7, 1979) was the namesake and hānai daughter of Queen Liliʻuokalani of Hawai'i. She became an educator and was the first to formally teach the Hawaiian language at Kamehameha Schools.

== Life ==
Aholo was born on February 6, 1878, in Lahaina, Maui. Her parents were Keahi Aholo, who died shortly after the birth, and Luther Aholo, who would become a leading politician in the Kingdom of Hawaii and secretary at the time to Governor of Maui John Owen Dominis, husband of the future Queen Liliʻuokalani. The girl was the Aholos' third child, and there were many siblings from her father's previous marriage. Dominis and Liliʻuokalani's marriage had been childless, and she had decided to adopt the newborn child as her own under the Hawaiian tradition of hānai despite the disapproval of her husband, her mother-in-law and her brother King Kalākaua. She named her Lydia Kaʻonohiponiponiokalani Aholo. Besides Lydia, Liliʻuokalani also adopted Joseph Kaiponohea ʻAeʻa and John ʻAimoku Dominis. She grew up in the royal household with her hānai mother and hānai brothers. She attended Kawaiaha‘o Female Seminary and graduated from the Kamehameha School for Girls in 1897. Aholo also attended Oberlin College, where she studied music. In Queen Liliʻuokalani's old age, Aholo became a confidante to her hānai mother.

She worked with Principal Ida May Pope at Kamehameha School and taught Hawaiian language until her retirement at the age of 75. Never marrying or having children, she was devoted to her extended family. In later life, she became a mother figure to her grandniece and grandnephews who called her Aunty Tūtū. She had a strong influence on her grandnephew Alfred Apaka, a baritone singer who popularized romantic Hawaiian ballads during the 1950s.

In 1969, Helen G. Allen interviewed Aholo at the Maunalani Hospital in Kaimuki. Allen would use the tapes from the interviews to write her 1982 book The Betrayal of Liliuokalani. Parts of the tapes were rediscovered in 2008 by historian Sandra Bonura. Aholo died on July 7, 1979, at the age of 101. She was buried at Nuʻuanu Memorial Park.

== Bibliography ==
- Allen, Helena G. (1982). The Betrayal of Liliuokalani: Last Queen of Hawaii, 1838–1917. Glendale, CA: A. H. Clark Company. ISBN 978-0-87062-144-4. OCLC 9576325.
- Bonura, Sandra; Witmer, Sally (2013). "Lydia K. Aholo — Her Story Recovering the Lost Voice". The Hawaiian Journal of History. 47. Honolulu: Hawaiian Historical Society: 103–145. hdl:10524/36266. OCLC 60626541.
