= John ʻAimoku Dominis =

Adopted son of queen of Hawai'i (1883–1917)

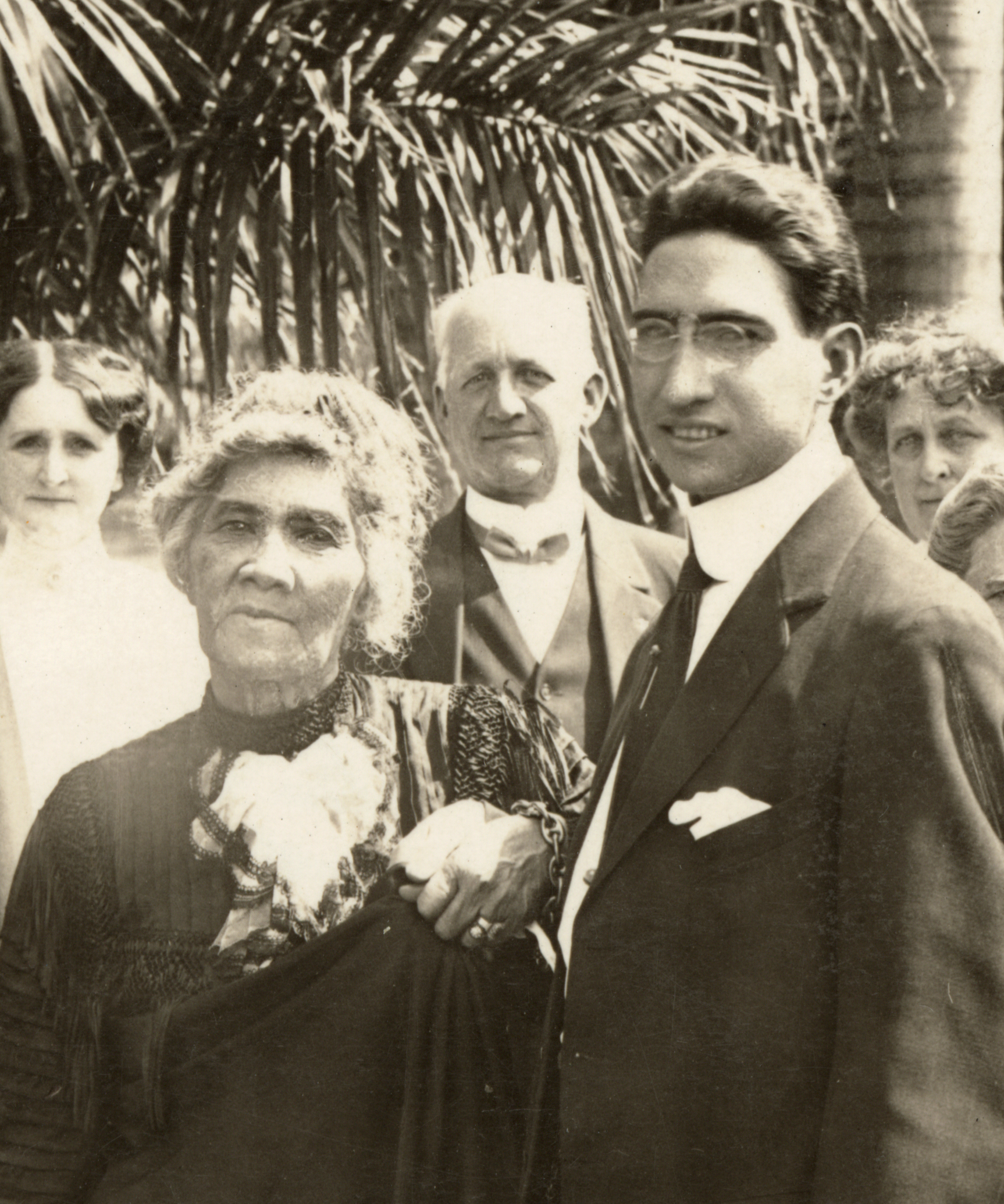
The Queen leaning on the arms of John ʻAimoku Dominis, c. 1913

John Owen ʻAimoku Dominis (January 9, 1883 – July 7, 1917) was the illegitimate son of John Owen Dominis and Mary Purdy Lamiki ʻAimoku, and the adopted (hānai) son of Queen Liliʻuokalani of the Kingdom of Hawai'i. He served as a Trustee of Queen Liliʻuokalani's Trust, in which he was named a beneficiary.

== Biography ==
He was born on January 9, 1883, in the Waikiki residence of Liliʻuokalani. The boy was the illegitimate son of Liliʻuokalani's husband John Owen Dominis and Mary Purdy Lamiki ʻAimoku (1855–1921), one of her household retainers. His father was an American from Schenectady, New York who served in many political posts including as Governor of Oʻahu during the reigns of the Kamehamehas and the House of Kalākaua, which he married into. His mother was a hapa-haole, of part Hawaiian descent, while his maternal grandmother Mary Purdy was a relative of the family of Samuel Parker.

Liliʻuokalani had learned of the pregnancy from the royal physician Georges Phillipe Trousseau in November 1882. In an effort to protect her unfaithful husband, she considered claiming the child as their own and establishing him as the next in line to the throne. This act would have been illegal. Instead, he was cared for by his grandmother Mary Purdy and financially supported by Liliʻuokalani, who adopted him under the Hawaiian tradition of hānai. Besides ʻAimoku, she also adopted Lydia Kaʻonohiponiponiokalani Aholo and Joseph Kaiponohea ʻAeʻa. Liliʻuokalani would later succeed as Queen of Hawaii in 1891 and be overthrown in 1893. After a period as the Republic of Hawaii, the islands were annexed to the United States becoming the Territory of Hawaii. Revolutionists and annexationists openly criticized 'Aimoku's mother and the circumstances of his illegitimate birth in order to undermine the reputation of the former queen. During this politically turbulent period, 'Aimoku attended the ʻIolani School.

In 1909, he was included in Liliʻuokalani's deed trust and also named a trustee. Her intention was to will her and Dominis' personal home, Washington Place, to him as a lifelong estate for himself and his descendants. In 1910, many years after the death of her husband, Liliʻuokalani officially adopted ʻAimoku and changed his name to John ʻAimoku Dominis. ʻAimoku served as an assistant clerk to Henry Smith in the local circuit court and later worked the insurance business in the office of Bishop Trust Company before his last illness.

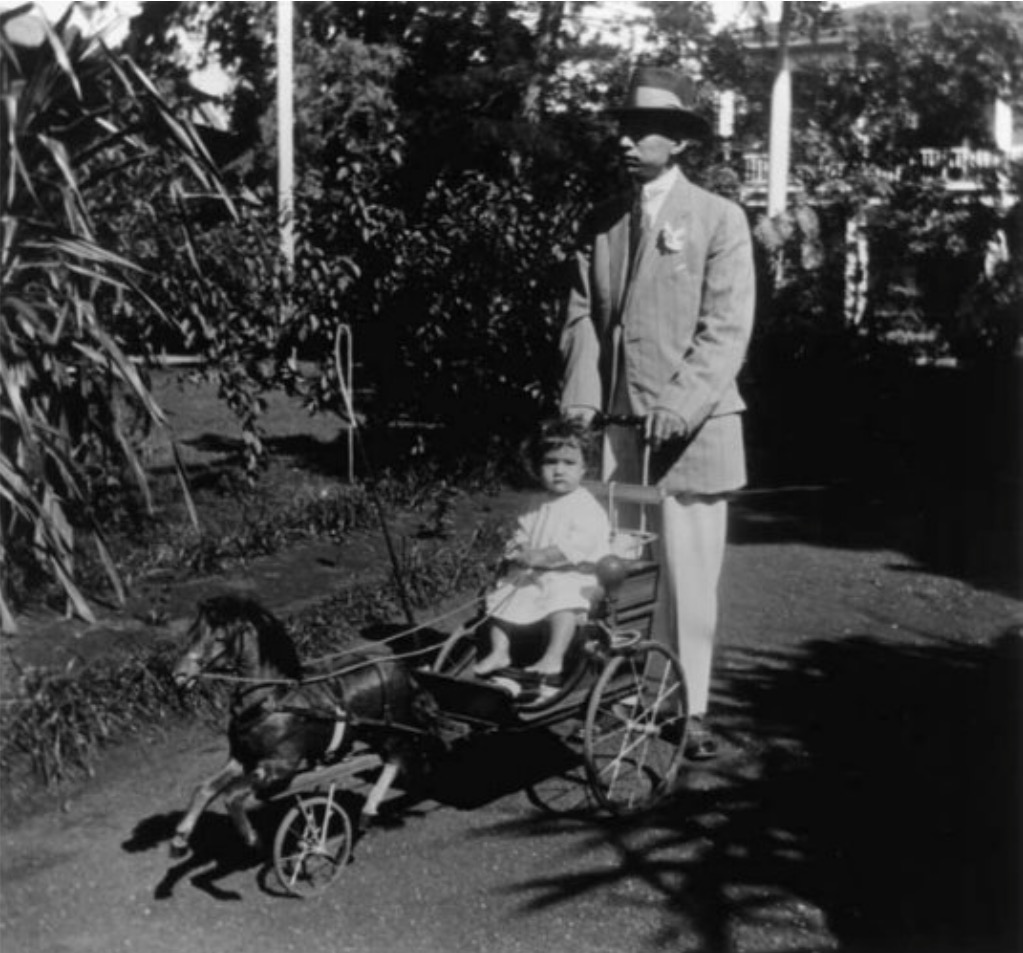
John ʻAimoku Dominis and son at Washington Place, 1913

He married Sybil Frances Kahulumanu McInerny (1891–1994), on June 19, 1911, at Washington Place. His wife was the daughter of Edward Aylett McInerny and Rose Kapuakomela Stillman Wond McInerny, both from old kamaʻāina families. They had three children: John Owen Dominis (1912–1933), who was named by the former queen after her husband, Sybil Frances Kaolaokalani O Liliuokalani Dominis (1914–1998), and Virginia Beatrice Kauhanenuiohonokawailani Dominis Koch (1916–2007).

On July 7, 1917, after suffering from a long illness considered hopeless for several days, ʻAimoku died at the McInerny residence at Kāhala. He was thirty-four years old. Following a funeral service at St. Andrews Cathedral, he was cremated and his remains buried at Oahu Cemetery. He was survived by his widow and children.

Following the death of Liliʻuokalani in the same year, his heir inherited his right to Washington Place. The Queen Liliʻuokalani's Trust offered the property to the territorial government with the understanding they would "will make provision for the rights of the Dominis minors, who have a life interest as tenants in the premises." However, the bill authorizing the purchase of Washington Place never passed the territorial legislature and the home and surrounding property were condemned by the territorial government under the law of eminent domain. The heirs of Dominis contested this action in court but their case was withdrawn. By taking Washington Place via eminent domain, neither the trustees nor the territorial government had to compensate the Dominis' children and they were deprived of their claims to the life estate. Subsequently, Washington Place was converted into the Executive Mansion for the Governors of Hawaii until 2007, when it became a museum.

== Bibliography ==
- Allen, Helena G. (1982). The Betrayal of Liliuokalani: Last Queen of Hawaii, 1838–1917. Glendale, CA: A. H. Clark Company. ISBN 978-0-87062-144-4. OCLC 9576325.
- Amalu, Sammy (1974). Jack Burns: a Portrait in Transition. Honolulu: Mamalahoa Foundation. OCLC 1055083.
- Bonura, Sandra; Witmer, Sally (2013). "Lydia K. Aholo — Her Story Recovering the Lost Voice". The Hawaiian Journal of History. 47. Honolulu: Hawaiian Historical Society: 103–145. hdl:10524/36266. OCLC 60626541.
- Iaukea, Sydney L. (2011). The Queen and I: A Story of Dispossessions and Reconnections in Hawaiʻi. Berkeley: University of California Press. ISBN 978-0-520-95030-6. OCLC 763161035.
