= Dollar princess =

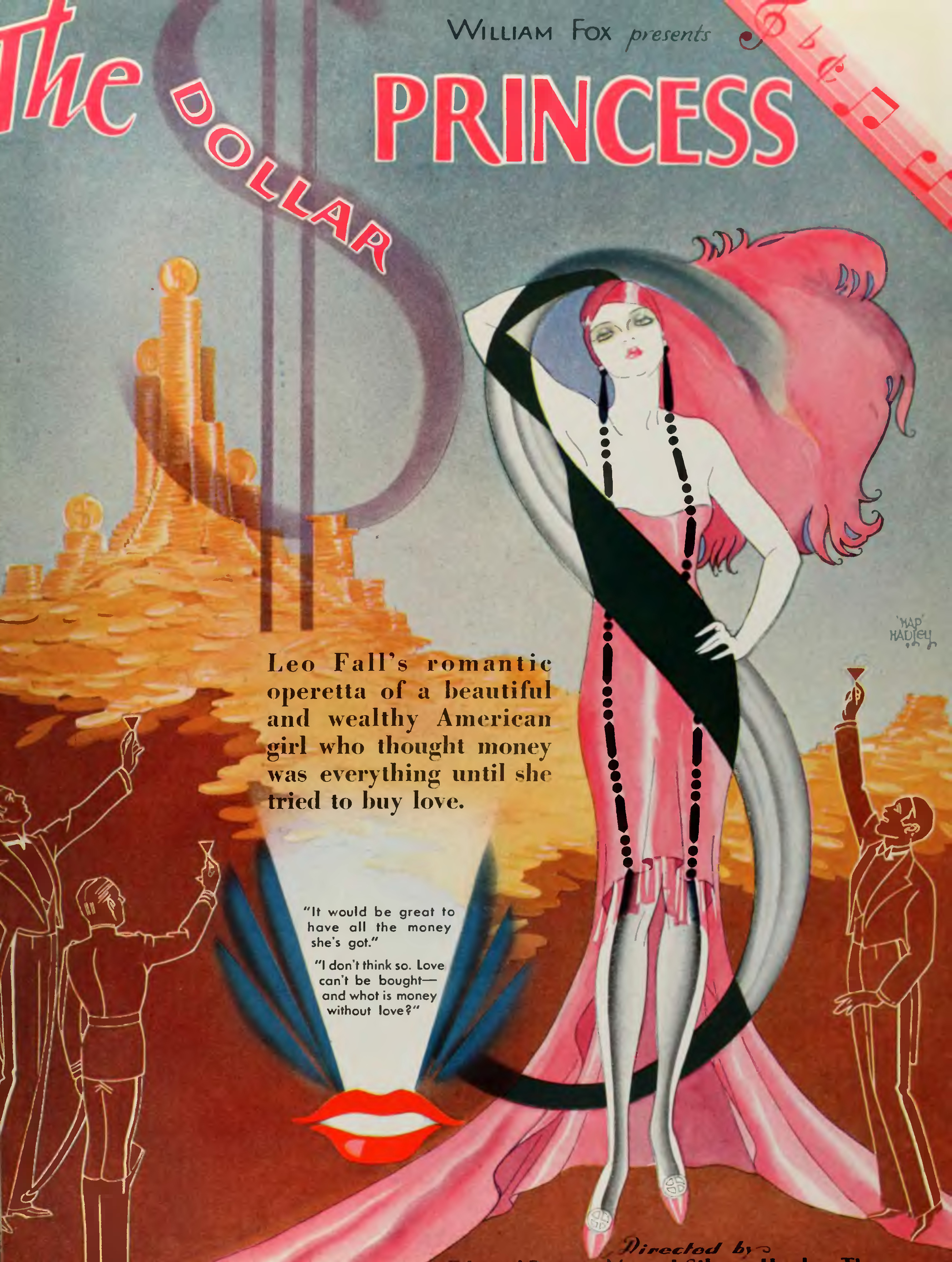
Advert for film version of The Dollar Princess, 1929

Dollar princesses (sometimes known as "dollar duchesses") were wealthy American women of the late 19th and early 20th centuries who married into titled European families, exchanging wealth for prestige. They were often the daughters of nouveau riche tycoons whose families wanted to gain social standing. The term was also used occasionally in the Danish press for any woman of means marrying into a titled family.

According to a book called Titled Americans (1915), there were 454 marriages between Gilded Age and Progressive Era American women and European aristocrats, most of whom were Britons. The Library of Congress noted in a reference guide that "American heiresses married more than a third of the House of Lords". Between 1870 and 1914, 102 British aristocrats, six of whom were dukes, married American women.

== Women called dollar princesses ==
- Jeanette "Jennie" Jerome, daughter of financier Leonard Jerome, married Lord Randolph Churchill, third son of the 7th Duke of Marlborough, in 1874. They were the parents of Sir Winston Churchill.
- María Francisca de la Consolación "Consuelo" Yznaga, daughter of diplomat Don Antonio Modesto Yznaga y del Valle, married George Montagu, Viscount Mandeville (later 8th Duke of Manchester), in 1876. She was the inspiration for Edith Wharton's The Buccaneers.
- Mary "Minnie" Fiske Stevens, daughter of hotelier Paran Stevens, married General Sir Arthur Paget, eldest son of Lord Alfred Paget and a grandson of the 1st Marquess of Anglesey, in 1878.
- Frances Ellen Work, daughter of stockbroker Franklin H. Work, married Hon. James Roche (later 3rd Baron Fermoy), second son of the 1st Baron Fermoy, in 1880. They were the great-grandparents of Diana, Princess of Wales.
- Mary Leiter, daughter of retail magnate Levi Leiter, married Hon. George Curzon (later 1st Baron Curzon of Kedleston, and ultimately 1st Marquess Curzon of Kedleston), eldest son of the 4th Baron Scarsdale, in 1895. Upon her husband's appointment as Viceroy of India in 1899, she became Vicereine of India, making her the highest-ranking American-born woman in the history of the British Empire.
- Consuelo Vanderbilt, daughter of William Kissam Vanderbilt, married Charles Spencer-Churchill, 9th Duke of Marlborough, in 1895.
- Nancy Langhorne, daughter of railroad industrialist Chiswell Langhorne, married Waldorf Astor (later 2nd Viscount Astor), eldest son of William Waldorf Astor and a great-great-grandson of John Jacob Astor, in 1897.
- Mary Goelet, daughter of real estate developer Ogden Goelet, married Henry Innes-Ker, 8th Duke of Roxburghe in 1903.
- Alberta Sturges, daughter of businessman William Sturges and stepdaughter of wholesale grocer Francis Howard Leggett, married George Montagu (later 9th Earl of Sandwich), only son of Rear-Admiral Hon. Victor Montagu and a grandson of the 7th Earl of Sandwich, in 1905.
- Margaretta Drexel, daughter of banker Anthony Joseph Drexel, married Guy Finch-Hatton, Viscount Maidstone (later 14th Earl of Winchilsea and 9th Earl of Nottingham), in 1910.
- In the early 1920s, Princess Anastasia of Greece and Denmark, a wealthy widow born Nonnie May Stewart in Zanesville, Ohio, who had married the youngest brother of the King of the Hellenes, was described as battling the American dollar princess stereotype.
- A 1928 news report suggested that an unnamed American dollar princess might be last in the running to wed Tsar Boris III of Bulgaria.
- Eli Marie Thaulow, better known as Else Frölich (the Norwegian-Danish silent film actress), married Danish opera singer Louis de la Cruz Frölich on 9 June 1903. The Danish press called her a "dollarprinsesse", which was inaccurate because she came from a highly accomplished and noted Norwegian family and had no need to marry up.

== In fiction ==
The phrase seems to appear frequently as a trope of fiction, such as in Georgina Norway's Tregarthen (1896):

With Coventry so expensive a man, and Algernon's debts always coming to be paid off, and the girls unmarried, I can assure you that we are awfully poor ourselves. I may tell you, in confidence, strict confidence, that I often dare not send Madame Elise's bills to the earl! But you must must try, my dear. We must look out for an American dollar princess for you. They expect a title, certainly, in general, but we must hope.

"The Adventure of the Noble Bachelor", an 1892 short story by Arthur Conan Doyle, has Sherlock Holmes solving the mystery of the American heiress who marries Lord St. Simon then immediately disappears after the wedding.

The Buccaneers, a 1938 novel by Edith Wharton, is set in this milieu.

Cora Crawley (née Levinson), the Countess of Julian Fellowes's Downton Abbey, is written as a wealthy American heiress who married the Earl of Grantham, and whose dowry helped save Downton from financial ruin.

In The Gilded Age, also created by Fellowes, Gladys Russell, the only daughter of robber baron George Russell, is likewise pressured by her mother into an arranged marriage with the Duke of Buckingham, who needs funds to maintain his estate.

== See also ==
- List of Americans who married foreign royalty and nobility
- List of American heiresses
- Nouveau riche
- Regency romance – Subgenre of romance novels
- Peerages in the United Kingdom
