= Joseph Kaiponohea ʻAeʻa =

Hawaiian royal

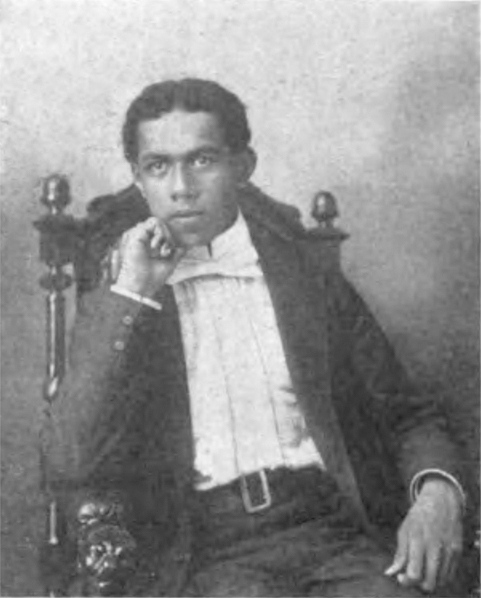
- Joseph Kaiponohea ʻAeʻa, 1901
- Born: June 22, 1882
- Died: November 14, 1914 (aged 32); Waikiki, Honolulu, O'ahu, Kingdom of Hawaii
- Education: Fort Street School; ʻIolani College; Kamehameha School for Boys
- Relatives: Liliʻuokalani (adoptive mother)

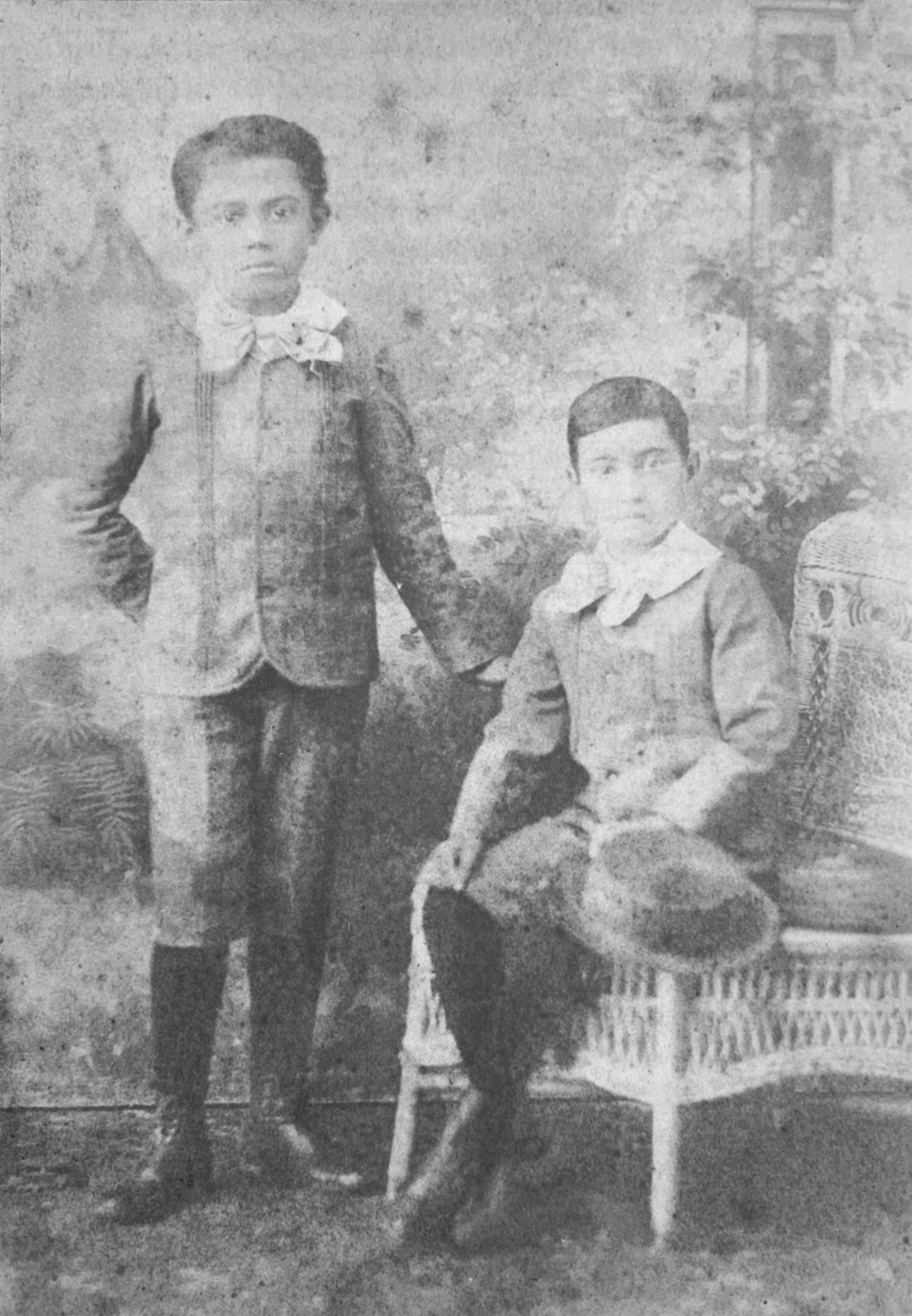
ʻAeʻa and John ʻAimoku Dominis, c. 1890

Joseph Kaiponohea ʻAeʻa (June 22, 1882 – November 14, 1914) was the adoptive son of Queen Liliʻuokalani under the Hawaiian tradition of hānai. He was considered her favorite hānai son.

== Biography ==
He was born on June 22, 1882, to Joseph Kapeau ʻAeʻa and his wife Kaheo ʻAeʻa. Both his parents were pure Native Hawaiians and retainers of the future Queen Liliʻuokalani, who was heir-presumptive to the Hawaiian throne at the time. Not having any children of her own, Liliʻuokalani adopted the infant boy under the Hawaiian tradition of hānai. She named him Joseph Kaiponohea ʻAeʻa and referred to him as Kaipo throughout his life. Besides Kaipo, she also adopted Lydia Kaʻonohiponiponiokalani Aholo and John ʻAimoku Dominis.

Historian Helena Allen described how the Queen "adored him — a curly haired, bright-eyed toddler — her heart contracted every time she saw him". Both biological parents took advantage of Liliʻuokalani's love for Kaipo to extort favors and debt forgiveness from her, blackmailing her by threatening to take their son away if she refused.

He was educated at Fort Street School and ʻIolani College and graduated in 1900 from the Kamehameha School for Boys. In 1901, he was recommended as a candidate for the United States Military Academy at West Point by Delegate Robert William Wilcox, but he failed to pass the English section of entrance examination. After his failure, Wilcox chose part Native Hawaiians: E. Vivian Richardson, who declined the nomination, and later Clarence Kumukoa Lyman, who became the first Native Hawaiian to attend West Point.

ʻAeʻa worked as a stenographer and clerk in the Honolulu clerk's office. In 1909, he was named in the queen's deed trust as a beneficiary in which she willed him Kealohilani, her Waikiki residence, and the fishery grounds of Hamohamo. He never married or had children. While at the Waikiki home of Kealohilani, Kaipo died on November 14, 1914, at the age of thirty-two. The cause of death was Bright's disease. Following a funeral service at St. Andrews Cathedral, he was buried the following day at the upper Manoa cemetery. Too ill to attend the funeral, Liliʻuokalani remained in at Washington Place in mourning for her hānai son.

== Bibliography ==
- Allen, Helena G. (1982). The Betrayal of Liliuokalani: Last Queen of Hawaii, 1838–1917. Glendale, CA: A. H. Clark Company. ISBN 978-0-87062-144-4. OCLC 9576325.
- Bonura, Sandra; Witmer, Sally (2013). "Lydia K. Aholo — Her Story Recovering the Lost Voice". The Hawaiian Journal of History. 47. Honolulu: Hawaiian Historical Society: 103–145. hdl:10524/36266. OCLC 60626541.
- Iaukea, Sydney L. (2011). The Queen and I: A Story of Dispossessions and Reconnections in Hawaiʻi. Berkeley: University of California Press. ISBN 978-0-520-95030-6. OCLC 763161035.
