= Pavol Šuhaj =

Slovak footballer

Personal information
- Full name: Pavol Šuhaj
- Date of birth: 16 April 1981 (age 45)
- Place of birth: Lipany, Czechoslovakia
- Height: 1.93 m (6 ft 4 in)
- Position: Forward

Youth career
- Odeva Lipany

Senior career*
Years	Team	Apps	(Gls)
2000–2001	Partizán Bardejov		
2001–2003	Rimavská Sobota		
2003	Patraikos		
2003–2005	Laugaricio Trenčín		
2005–2007	Crewe Alexandra	8	(0)
2007–2008	Nantwich Town		
2008–2009	Mesto Prievidza		
2009–2010	Odeva Lipany		
2011	Skałka Żabnica	12	(1)
2011–2013	Rosina		
- * Club domestic league appearances and goals

Pavol Šuhaj (born 16 April 1981) is a Slovak former professional footballer who played as a forward.

== Playing career ==
Šuhaj joined Football League Championship club Crewe Alexandra in July 2005 from Slovak Super Liga side Laugaricio Trenčín. He made eight appearances in two seasons with the club before being released at the end of the 2006–07 campaign. Šuhaj had a trial with Stafford Rangers that summer, and then signed for Nantwich Town. In one season with the club he helped them win the Cheshire Senior Cup, where he scored a hat-trick in the final, and the Northern Premier League Division One South play-offs. Šuhaj was released at the end of the 2007–08 campaign and returned to Slovakia to play for Mesto Prievidza.
