= Governors of Oʻahu =

Royal governor of the Kingdom of Hawaii

The governor of Oʻahu (Hawaiian: Kiaʻaina o Oʻahu) was the royal governor or viceroy of the island of Oʻahu in the Kingdom of Hawaii. The Governor of Oʻahu resided at Honolulu and was usually a Hawaiian chief or prince and could even be a woman. The governor had authority over the island of Oahu and Honolulu, the kingdom's capital, and it was up to the governor to appoint lieutenant governors to assist them. The governor had replaced the old alii aimokus of the islands, but sovereignty remained with the king. The island governors were under the jurisdiction of the Ministers of the Interiors. Either the governor or the monarch had the power to call in foreign assistance in time of troubles. This occurred a few times, including the uprising of the Emmaites in 1874 when John Owen Dominis called for British and American assistance. Neither the governor nor monarch called for foreign assistance in January 1893 when John L. Stevens sent American troops into Honolulu.

== Role ==
In the 1840 Constitution of the Kingdom of Hawaii it states:

There shall be four governors over these Hawaiian Islands - one for Hawaiʻi - one for Maui and the Islands adjacent - one for Oʻahu, and one for Kauaʻi and the adjacent Islands. All the governors, from Hawaiʻi to Kauaʻi shall be subject to the King.

The prerogatives of the governors and their duties, shall be as follows: Each governor shall have the general direction of the several tax gatherers of his island, and shall support them in the execution of all their orders which he considers to have been properly given, but shall pursue a course according to law, and not according to his own private views. He also shall preside over all the judges of his island, and shall see their sentences executed as above. He shall also appoint the judges and give them their certificates of office.

All the governors, from Hawaiʻi to Kauaʻi shall be subject not only to the King, but also to the Premier.

The governor shall be the superior over his particular island or islands. He shall have charge of the munitions of war, under the direction of the King, however, and the Premier. He shall have charge of the forts, the soldiery, the arms and all the implements of war. He shall receive the government dues and shall deliver over the same to the Premier. All important decisions rest with him in times of emergency, unless the King or Premier be present. He shall have charge of all the King's business on the island, the taxation, new improvements to be extended, and plans for the increase of wealth, and all officers shall be subject to him. He shall also have power to decide all questions, and transact all island business which is not by law assigned to others.

When either of the governors shall decease, then all the chiefs shall assemble at such place as the King shall appoint, and shall nominate a successor of the deceased governor, and whosoever they shall nominate and be approved by the King, he shall be the new governor.

== Abolishment ==
After King Kalākaua was forced to sign the Bayonet Constitution in 1887, the island governorships began to be viewed as wasteful expenses for the monarchy. The governors and governesses at the time (who were mainly royals or nobles) were also viewed unfit to appoint the native police forces and condemned for "their refusal to accept their removal or reform by sheriffs or the marshal". The island governorships were abolished by two acts: the first act, on December 8, 1887, transferred the power of the police appointment to the island sheriffs, and the second, An Act To Abolish The Office Of Governor, which officially abolished the positions, on August 23, 1888. King Kalākaua refused to approve the 1888 act, but his veto was overridden by two-thirds of the legislature. These positions were restored under the An Act To Establish A Governor On Each Of The Islands Of Oahu, Maui, Hawaii and Kauai on November 14, 1890, with the effective date of January 1, 1891. One significant change was this act made it illegal for a woman to be governor ending the traditional practice of appointing female royals and nobles as governess. Kalākaua died prior to reappointing any of the island governors, but his successor Liliuokalani restored the positions at different dates between 1891 and 1892. After the overthrow of the Kingdom of Hawaii, the Provisional Government of Hawaii repealed the 1890 act and abolished these positions on February 28, 1893 for the final time.

== List of governors of Oʻahu ==
Name	Picture	Birth	Death	Assumed office	Left office	Notes	Monarch
Direct rule by King Kamehameha I from Waikiki.
Kūihelani		c. 1750	c. 1815	c. 1796	c. 1815		Kamehameha I
Isaac Davis ʻAikake		c. 1758	April, 1810	?	April, 1810?		Kamehameha I
Oliver Holmes		November 2, 1777	August 6, 1825	c. 1810	?		Kamehameha I
Oliver Holmes		November 2, 1777	August 6, 1825	c. 1810	?		Kamehameha II
Lydia Nāmāhāna Piʻia		c. 1787	September 12, 1829	c. ?	c. 18..		Kamehameha II
Lydia Nāmāhāna Piʻia		c. 1787	September 12, 1829	c. ?	c. 18..		Kamehameha III
Boki Kamāʻuleʻule		c. 1780	December, 1829	18..	December, 1829		Kamehameha III
Kuini Liliha		c. 1780	August 25, 1839	December, 1829	April 1, 1831	acting; widow of Governor Boki	Kamehameha III
John Adams Kiʻiapalaoku Kuakini		c. 1789	December 9, 1844	April 1, 1831	c. 1833	acting	Kamehameha III
Elizabeth Kīnaʻu Kaʻahumanu II		c. 1805	April 4, 1839	c. 1833?	April 4, 1839?		Kamehameha III
Mataio Kekūanaōʻa		c. 1793	November 4, 1868	November 17, 1846 (official proclamation, but exercised power as early as 1836)	February 18, 1864	widower of Kīnaʻu; Deputy N. Kahulanui	Kamehameha III
Mataio Kekūanaōʻa		c. 1793	November 4, 1868	November 17, 1846 (official proclamation, but exercised power as early as 1836)	February 18, 1864	widower of Kīnaʻu; Deputy N. Kahulanui	Kamehameha IV
Mataio Kekūanaōʻa		c. 1793	November 4, 1868	November 17, 1846 (official proclamation, but exercised power as early as 1836)	February 18, 1864	widower of Kīnaʻu; Deputy N. Kahulanui	Kamehameha V
John Owen Dominis		March 10, 1832	August 27, 1891	February 18, 1864	October 4, 1886	first time	Kamehameha V
John Owen Dominis		March 10, 1832	August 27, 1891	February 18, 1864	October 4, 1886	first time	Lunalilo
John Owen Dominis		March 10, 1832	August 27, 1891	February 18, 1864	October 4, 1886	first time	Kalākaua
Curtis Piʻehu Iaukea		December 13, 1855	March 5, 1940	October 4, 1886	August 5, 1887		Kalākaua
Antone Rosa		November 10, 1855	September 9, 1898	April 12, 1887	July 7, 1887	acting	Kalākaua
Archibald Scott Cleghorn		November 15, 1835	November 1, 1910	July 7, 1887	July 26, 1887	acting; first time	Kalākaua
John Owen Dominis		March 10, 1832	August 27, 1891	August 5, 1887	August 23, 1888	second time	Kalākaua
Interregnum
John Owen Dominis		March 10, 1832	August 27, 1891	March 2, 1891	November 11, 1891	third time	Liliʻuokalani
Archibald Scott Cleghorn		November 15, 1835	November 1, 1910	November 11, 1891	February 28, 1893	second time	Liliʻuokalani

== See also ==
- List of governors of Hawaii
  - Governors of Hawaiʻi (island)
  - Governors of Kauaʻi
  - Governors of Maui
- Aliʻi nui of Oʻahu
- Mayor of Honolulu
