= Monica von Neumann =

American socialite (1964–2019)

- Born: Monica Ann Ford; 15 June 1964; Detroit, Michigan, United States
- Died: March 5, 2019 (aged 54); Los Angeles, California, United States
- Buried: Hillside Memorial Park Cemetery
- Noble family: von Neumann
- Spouse: John Neumann Ritter von Héthárs (1985-2003; his death)
- Issue: Dorian von Neumann (Dorian Neumann von Héthárs)
- Occupation: businesswoman, socialite, dancer, model

Monica Ann Neumann von Héthárs, also known as Baroness Monica von Neumann, (née Ford; June 15, 1964 – March 5, 2019), was an American socialite and businesswoman. She worked as a fashion model and dancer before marrying John Neumann Ritter von Héthárs in 1985.

== Early life ==
Monica von Neumann was born into an African-American working-class family in Detroit, Michigan. As a child, she moved with her mother to Los Angeles. She studied dance at the Roland Dupree Dance Academy. She attended Fairfax High School in Fairfax District, Los Angeles.

== Career and philanthropy ==
Von Neumann danced professionally before getting married, going on tour with Nina Simone and Devo. She also worked as a model for Yves Saint Laurent and Dior, walking in runway shows and standing in for fittings at ateliers in Paris.

In 2010, she launched the luxury home-goods retailer Baroness von Neumann Candles, which sold high-end scented candles. The candle logo was the Von Neumann family crest. In December 2010, she was a guest on BET's The Mo'Nique Show.

In 2013, she was considered for a spot as a cast member of the American reality television series Real Housewives of Beverly Hills. She reportedly met with producers but ended up not joining the cast.

In February 2013, von Neumann, along with Daphne Guinness and Lynn Ban, donated a collection of her shoes to the Museum at Fashion Institute of Technology's Shoe Obsession exhibit. Von Neumann was featured in the documentary God Save My Shoes, which followed extreme shoe collectors.

She was a patron of Inner-City Arts and the Boys & Girls Clubs of America. She was also involved with Hollyrod Foundation, an organization that offers support to families with children that have autism. As a patron of the organizations March To The Top and AINA, von Neumann traveled to Kenya and assisted in establishing an orphanage.

== Personal life ==
When she was eighteen years old she was introduced to John Neumann Ritter von Héthárs, the son of Heinrich Neumann Ritter von Héthárs, by Sonny Bono at a dinner party in Palm Springs. She began a relationship with von Neumann, who was the first importer of Volkswagens to the United States. After they got engaged, she attended a finishing school in Switzerland. She and von Neumann married in 1985. They had one daughter, Dorian. Her husband's family, the von Neumanns, are a Hungarian Jewish family that was elevated into the nobility by the Austrian emperor. While a branch of her husband's family held the rank of Freiherr (baron), her husband did not. He held the hereditary title Ritter, which is the German equivalent to a baronet or hereditary knight. Her husband died from cancer in 2003.

Prior to his death, Von Neumann's husband allegedly had a son from an extramarital affair with Charlotte Vega. In 2010, she was involved in a legal battle against Charlotte's son, John Vega, regarding his paternity.

== Death ==
Monica von Neumann died on March 5, 2019, due to health complications. She reportedly was in financial trouble at the time of her death. She is buried at Hillside Memorial Park Cemetery.
