= Lipany =

- Municipality
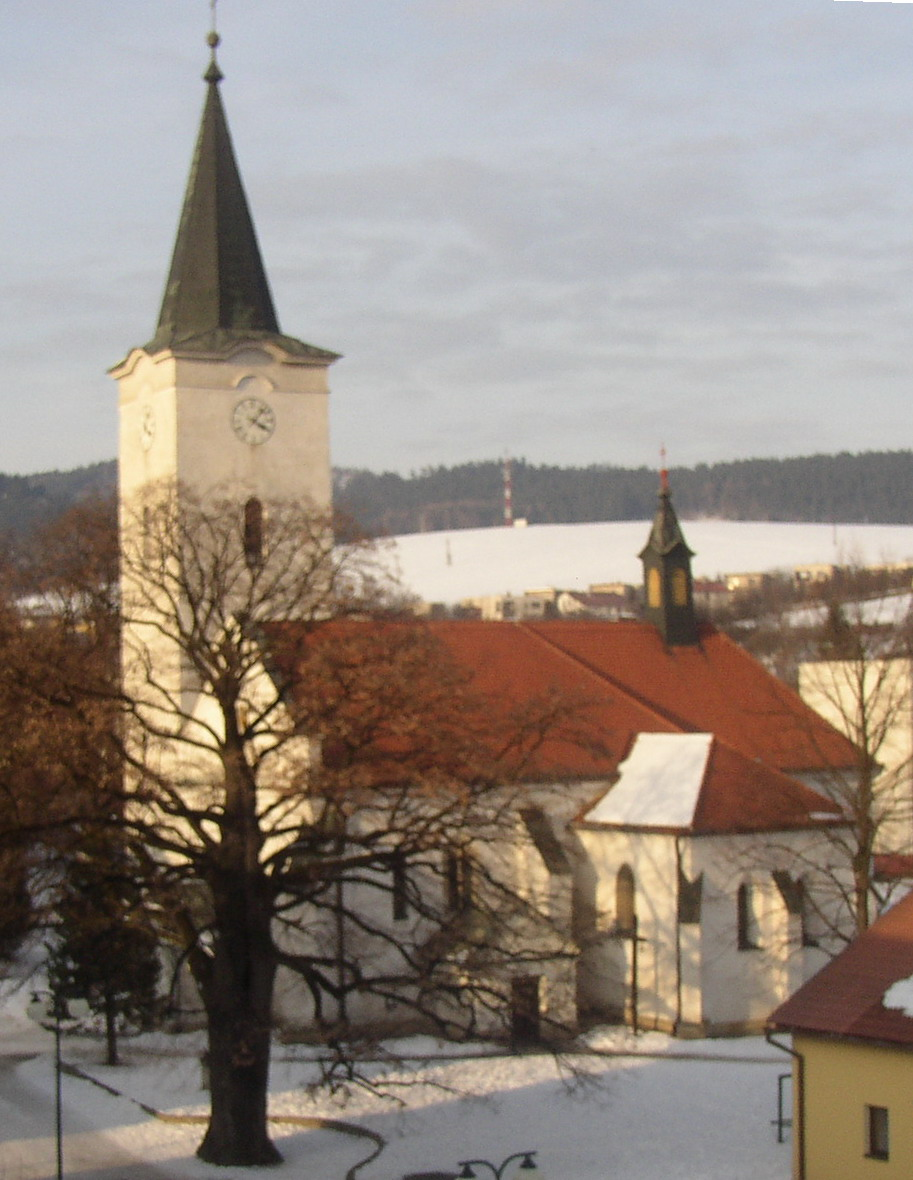

- Flag Coat of arms

- Location of Lipany in the Prešov Region Location of Lipany in Slovakia
- Coordinates: 49.15°N 20.96°E
- Country: Slovakia
- Region: Prešov Region
- District: Sabinov District
- First mentioned: 1312

Government
  - Mayor: Vladimír Jánošík

Area
  - Total: 12.85 km^{2} (4.96 sq mi)
- Elevation: 387 m (1,270 ft)

Population (2025)
  - Total: 6,475
- Time zone: UTC+1 (CET)
  - Summer (DST): UTC+2 (CEST)
- Postal code: 827 1
- Area code: +421 54
- Vehicle registration plate (until 2022): SB
- Website: www.lipany.sk

Lipany ('lindens;'; Hungarian: Héthárs, German: Siebenlinden, Latin: Septemtiliae all lit. 'seven lindens') is a town in the Sabinov District, Prešov Region in northeastern Slovakia.

== History ==
The first written mention about Lipany comes from 1312. It gained town privileges in the 16th century.

== Geography ==
The municipality lies at an altitude of 387 metres (1,270 ft) and covers an area of 12.85 km^{2} (4.96 sq mi) (2025). The Torysa River flows through the town. It is 12 km (7.46 mi) away from Sabinov, 29 km (18.02 mi) from Prešov and 35 km (21.75 mi) from Stará Ľubovňa.

== Population ==
Population statistic (10 years)
Year	1995	2005	2015	2025
Count	5896	6340	6413	6475
Difference		+7.53%	+1.15%	+0.96%

Population statistic
Year	2024	2025
Count	6450	6475
Difference		+0.38%

It has a population of 6475 people (31 December 2025).

=== Ethnicity ===
Census 2021 (1+ %)
Ethnicity	Number	Fraction
Slovak	6172	95.24%
Romani	822	12.68%
Not found out	292	4.5%
Rusyn	106	1.63%
Total	6480	

In year 2021 was 6480 people by ethnicity 6172 as Slovak, 822 as Romani, 292 as Not found out, 106 as Rusyn, 24 as Czech, 14 as Ukrainian, 13 as Other, 6 as Russian, 4 as Polish, 4 as German, 4 as Hungarian, 4 as Croatian, 2 as Italian and 2 as Austrian.

Note on population: The difference values of population numbers in the table "Population statistic" and in the sections "Ethnicity" & "Religion" is caused by the use of various statistical methods.

=== Religion ===
Census 2021 (1+ %)
Religion	Number	Fraction
Roman Catholic Church	5260	81.17%
Greek Catholic Church	423	6.53%
None	391	6.03%
Not found out	262	4.04%
Total	6480	

In year 2021 was 6480 people by religion 5260 from Roman Catholic Church, 423 from Greek Catholic Church, 391 from None, 262 from Not found out, 46 from Apostolic Church, 29 from Evangelical Church, 26 from Eastern Orthodox Church, 14 from Ad hoc movements, 6 from Other, 5 from Christian Congregations in Slovakia, 4 from Paganism and natural spirituality, 4 from Other and not ascertained christian church, 3 from Jehovah's Witnesses, 3 from Buddhism, 1 from Old Catholic Church, 1 from Calvinist Church, 1 from Islam and 1 from United Methodist Church.

Historical population
Year	Pop.	±%
1970	3,031	—
1980	4,523	+49.2%
1991	5,519	+22.0%
2001	6,130	+11.1%
2011	6,427	+4.8%
2021	6,480	+0.8%
Source: Censuses

According to the 2001 census, the town had 6,130 inhabitants. 91.17% of inhabitants were Slovaks, 7.37% Roma, 0.33% Czechs, 0.31% Ukrainians and 0.28% Rusyns. The religious make-up was 89.61% Roman Catholics, 5.99% Greek Catholics, 2.38% people with no religious affiliation and 0.31% Lutherans.

== Twin towns — sister cities ==
Lipany is twinned with:

- Piwniczna-Zdrój, Poland
- Muszyna, Poland
- Strzyżów, Poland
- Gmina Fajsławice, Poland
- Jasło, Poland
- Khust, Ukraine

== People ==
- Adam Zreľák, a football player, born here
- Milan Gaľa, mayor of this town
- Heinrich Neumann von Héthárs, born here
- Pavol Šuhaj, a football player, born here
- Stanislav Varga, a football player, born here

== See also ==
- ŠK Odeva Lipany
- Sáros County
