= Von Neumann family =

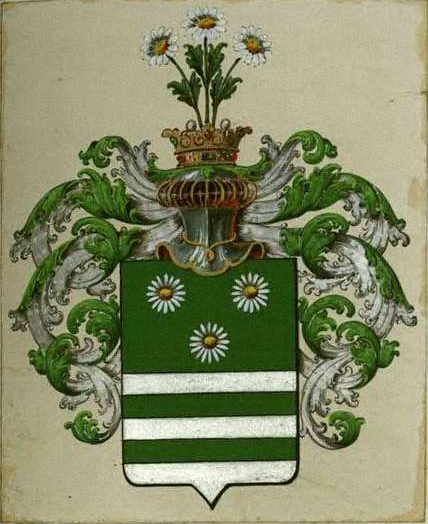
Coat of arms of Neumann de Margitta family (1913)

The Neumann family (also spelled von Neumann) is a Jewish family that was elevated to the ranks of nobility in Austria-Hungary.

== History ==
In 1830 Francis II, Holy Roman Emperor created the title Baron of Neumann for Philipp von Neumann. In 1913 Franz Joseph I of Austria elevated three branches of the family to noble rank. One branch of the family, von Neumann de Végvár, were elevated to the rank of baron.

The first three members of the family to be created Barons of Végvár were Adolf and Dániel Neumann. Later that year Franz Joseph I elevated Miksa von Neumann to the landed nobility. This branch was given the nobiliary particle and style von Neymann de Margitta. Another branch of the family Neumann von Héthárs were granted the rank of hereditary knight by the emperor.

== Notable family members ==
- Baron Philipp von Neumann (1781–1851), diplomat
- Heinrich Neumann Ritter von Héthárs (1873–1939), otorhinolaryngologist
- John von Neumann (1903–1957), mathematician
- Klara Dan von Neumann (1911–1963), computer scientist
- Angela von Neumann (1928–2010), artist
- Marina von Neumann Whitman (1935–2025), economist
- Frederick Bernard de Neumann (1943–2018), mathematician

== Sources ==
- Béla Kempelen: Magyar nemes családok (VII. kötet)
- János Gudenus: A magyarországi főnemesség XX. századi genealógiája
