= Kuihelani =

Biography of Kuihelani who was the first Governor of O'ahu, appointed by Kamehameha I.

Kūihelani was a Hawaiian government official who served as Governor of Oʻahu under Kamehameha I during the formative years of the Hawaiian Kingdom. Kamehameha appointed Kūihelani governor of Oʻahu in late 1796, after leaving the island following his conquest of Oʻahu and an unsuccessful attempt to invade Kauaʻi.

== Governor of Oʻahu ==
Kamehameha conquered Oʻahu in 1795 following the Battle of Nuʻuanu. After remaining on the island for a time, he attempted an invasion of Kauaʻi in 1796 but was forced to abandon the expedition. Historian Ralph Simpson Kuykendall wrote that when Kamehameha returned to Hawaiʻi toward the end of 1796, he appointed Kūihelani governor of Oʻahu.

Historian Richard A. Greer likewise identified Kūihelani as the official placed in charge of Oʻahu when Kamehameha left the island in the latter part of 1796. Kūihelani therefore appears at the beginning of the known succession of governors who administered Oʻahu under the Hawaiian monarchy.

The appointment was also recorded in the nineteenth-century historical writings of Samuel Kamakau, who described Kamehameha appointing Kūihelani as kiaʻāina of Oʻahu.

== Role in Kamehameha's government ==
Kūihelani was among the officials entrusted with authority during Kamehameha's consolidation of the islands. Kuykendall, drawing upon Kamakau's account, discussed Kūihelani's appointment in the context of Kamehameha's practice of placing trusted men in positions of governmental responsibility rather than relying exclusively on powerful hereditary chiefs.

Later Land Commission testimony described Kūihelani as a man who held significant responsibility under Kamehameha and who was well known among the king and other chiefs. Because this testimony was recorded decades after Kūihelani's lifetime, it is primarily useful for documenting his landholding and family relationships rather than establishing the chronology of his governorship.

== Family background ==
Hawaiian genealogical records identify Kūihelani as a son of Kaʻaloa and Kohulahaʻalani.

Kaʻaloa appears in Hawaiian historical traditions associated with Kamehameha I. Abraham Fornander's collection of Hawaiian traditions identifies Kaʻaloa among the counselors connected with Kamehameha. Kūihelani's later appointment as governor placed him within the governing circle Kamehameha established as he consolidated control over the Hawaiian Islands.

== Honolulu and landholdings ==
Kūihelani was associated with the early settlement around Honolulu Harbor. Greer described him as occupying land along the developing Honolulu waterfront and noted that he constructed an adobe house there. Land Commission testimony concerning the area records extensive holdings and residences associated with Kūihelani and members of his household in the vicinity of Kikihale and Kapuʻukolo.

The same records indicate that Kūihelani controlled land that later became part of the urban core of Honolulu. His household included relatives, retainers, and other dependents who occupied lots within the settlement.

Kūihelani also appears in accounts involving Francisco de Paula Marín, a Spanish-born adviser to Kamehameha who became an important figure in early Honolulu. Historical research on the Honolulu waterfront identifies lands associated with Kūihelani near those occupied by Marín.

== In Hawaiian historical accounts ==
John Papa ʻĪʻī, whose writings preserve firsthand and near-contemporary accounts of the early Hawaiian Kingdom, referred to Kūihelani in his historical recollections. One episode concerns the young Kuakini, later governor of Hawaiʻi and Oʻahu, who injured his foot while fleeing after being discovered with one of Kūihelani's wives.

The account is one of several references to Kūihelani in Hawaiian historical sources that depict him as a member of Kamehameha's governing circle during the period in which Honolulu was emerging as an important political and commercial center.

== Legacy ==
Although relatively little biographical information about Kūihelani survives, twentieth-century historians including Kuykendall and Greer have identified his appointment as part of the administrative organization established by Kamehameha following the conquest of Oʻahu. Modern lists of the governors of Oʻahu place Kūihelani at the beginning of the island's gubernatorial succession under Kamehameha I.
