= List of Hawaiian royal consorts =

A royal consort is a spouse of a monarch. The Kingdom of Hawaiʻi was founded by Kamehameha I (known as Kamehameha the Great) in 1795 after conquering the major islands in the Hawaiian archipelago. His dynasty lasted until Liliʻuokalani was deposed by a pro-United States revolution in 1893. Kamehameha I had numerous wives, perhaps over 21, but Kaʻahumanu was his most favorite wife.

== List of royal consorts ==
Notable wives of Kamehameha I not mentioned on this list are Queen Keōpūolani, his highest ranking wife; Queen Kalakua Kaheiheimālie, sister of Kaʻahumanu, and many others. His son Kamehameha II had five wives: Queen Kamāmalu, Queen Kekāuluohi, Queen Pauahi, Queen Kīnaʻu, and Queen Kekauʻōnohi. Kamehameha III was the first King of Hawaii to not practice polygamy. Queen Emma Naʻea was the first and only hapa haole (part native Hawaiian) queen consort. John Owen Dominis, a full blood American, was Hawaii's only prince consort by the virtue of his marriage to Liliʻuokalani. Every consort except Dominis outlived their spouse and many were close relatives (from siblings to distant cousins), except Kalama and Dominis.

=== Kamehameha Dynasty ===
Portrait	Name	Birth	Death	Consort to
	Queen Elizabeth Kaʻahumanu	1768	June 5, 1832	Kamehameha I
	Queen Kamāmalu	c. 1802	July 8, 1824	Kamehameha II
	Queen Kalama Hakaleleponi Kapakuhaili	c. 1817	September 30, 1870	Kamehameha III
	Queen Emma Naʻea Rooke	January 2, 1836	April 25, 1885	Kamehameha IV

=== Kalākaua Dynasty ===
Portrait	Name	Birth	Death	Consort to
	Queen Kapiʻolani	December 31, 1834	June 24, 1899	Kalākaua
	Prince Consort John Owen Dominis	March 10, 1832	August 27, 1891	Liliʻuokalani

== See also ==
- List of people from Hawaii
