= Heinrich Neumann von Héthárs =

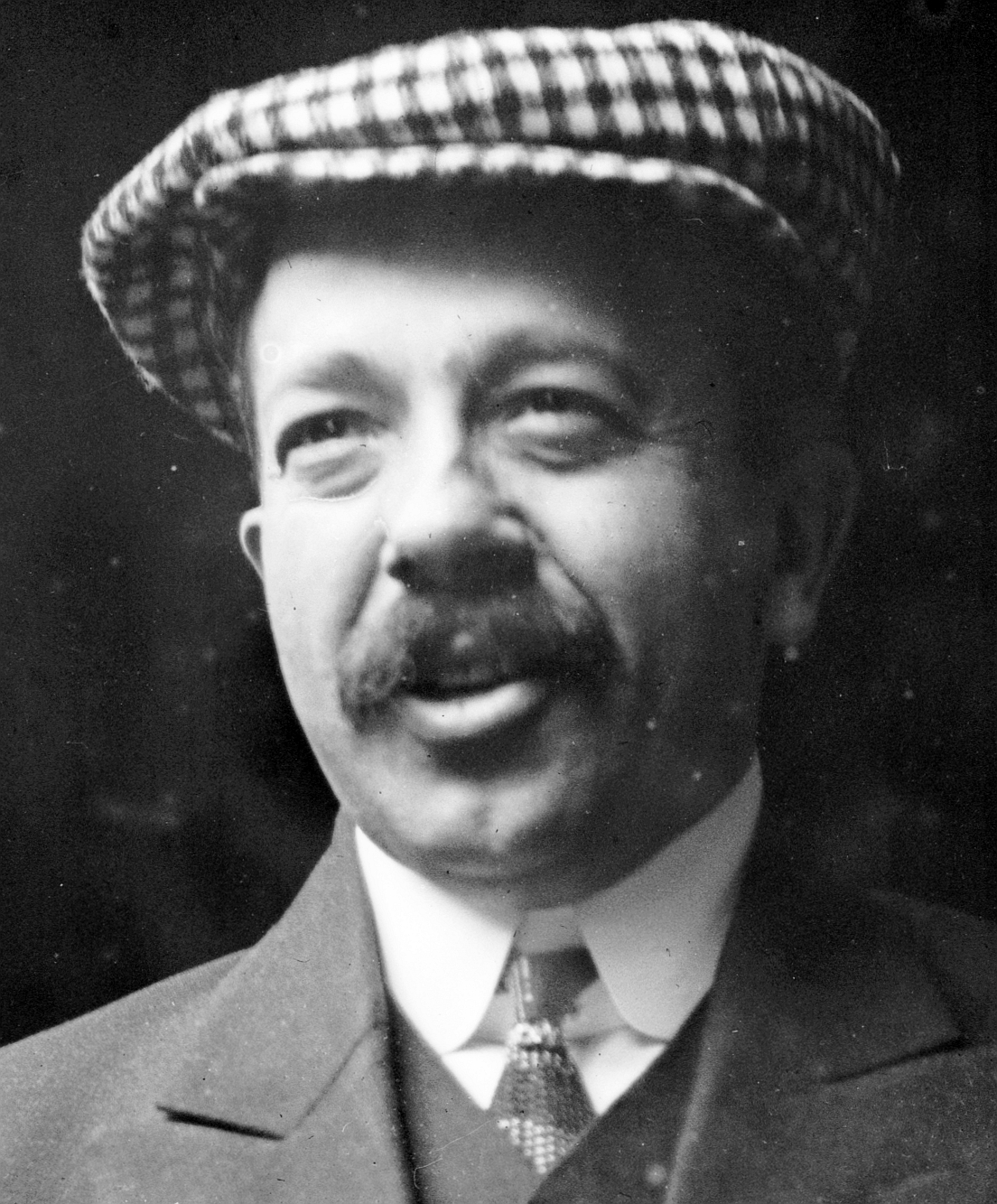
Heinrich Neumann von Héthárs

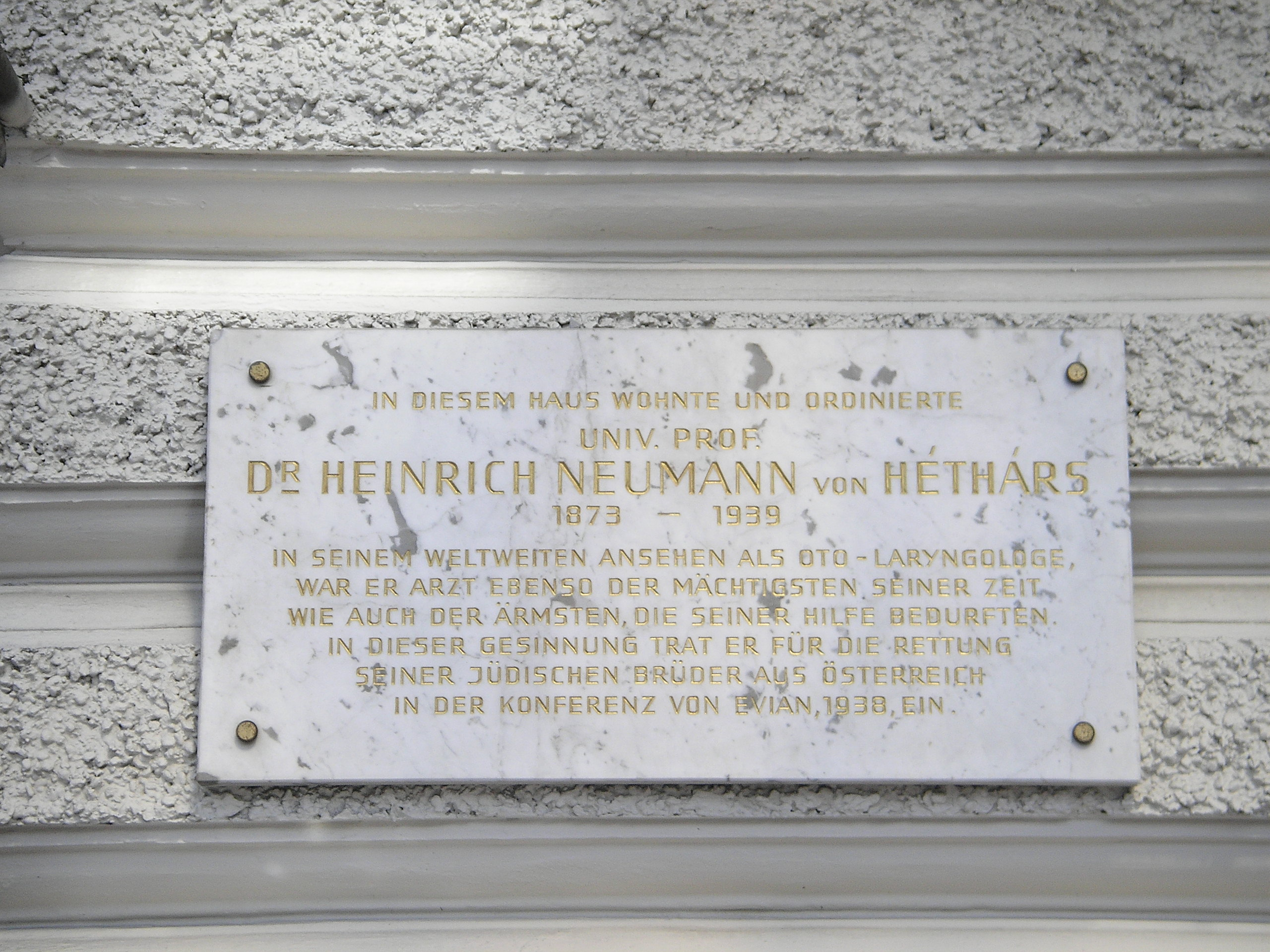
Memorial plaque for Heinrich Neumann von Héthárs at the Café Landtmann in Vienna Translated, the plaque reads: "In this house lived, and treated his patients, univ[ersity] prof[essor] Dr. Heinrich Neumann von Héthárs (1873-1939). World-famous as an oto-laryngologist, he treated the most powerful of his times as well as the poorest who needed his help. With this conscience he defended the rescue of his Jewish brethren from Austria at the Conference of Evian in 1938."

Heinrich Neumann Ritter von Héthárs (10 June 1873, in Héthárs (Lipany), then Hungary, now Slovakia – 6 November 1939, in New York City) was the foremost ear-nose-and-throat doctor in Vienna before World War II. In 1938 he transmitted to the Evian Conference the infamous offer by the German government to sell the Austrian Jews at a price of $250 per capita to any foreign country that would accept them and pay. This offer - and the Conference delegates' refusal to accept it - is the focal point of Hans Habe's novel The Mission (1965).

== Life ==
Heinrich Neumann studied at the University of Vienna, finishing with a doctorate in 1898. Already whilst a student he concerned himself with work on the normal and pathological anatomy of the ear in Anton Weichselbaum’s institute. He subsequently worked in Adam Politzer's private laboratory, and in 1900 he entered the university ear clinic, becoming assistant in 1903. In 1911 he became titular professor of otology. From 1910 on he was the ear surgeon at the Spital der Kaufmannschaft (Merchants' Hospital), and from 1912 on head of the otology department of the Franz-Josef-Ambulatorium. In 1919 he became professor extraordinary and head of the university clinic for diseases of the ear, nose and larynx, succeeding Viktor Urbantschitsch. Neumann was known as the King's Doctor. Years prior to the Anschluss, in 1935, he was contacted by Nazi Party doctors about a larynx problem that Adolf Hitler was suffering from. Prof. Dr. von Neumann, as he was by then known, refused to consider Hitler's case, explaining in his reply, that if the operation failed, it "might be construed as being connected with the fact that he is a Jew." Neumann was also sought by Galeazzo Ciano, Mussolini's son-in-law and Italy's then Foreign Minister. After the Anschluss, Neumann was imprisoned for being a Jew.

He was married once in 1912 to Melitta von Neumann née Koppel. They had three children, Lisa Rosenblatt, Murli von Neumann and Johnny von Neumann (not to be confused with John von Neumann the mathematician), who became a well-known racing driver and entrepreneur.

== Work ==
Neumann was particularly recognized for his works on painless operations on bone without anaesthetics, on the clinics and pathology of intracranial complications of infections of the middle ear, equilibrium, and otosclerosis. Neumann devised a new and life-saving operation for opening the labyrinth, a technique that has later been general practice. Named after him is Neumann's Method which is a manner to apply local anaesthesia of the middle ear and the mastoid process by a procaine-adrenaline injection on the surface of the mastoid process along the connection of the inner and outer ear and under the periost of the auditory meatus.
