= John Owen Dominis =

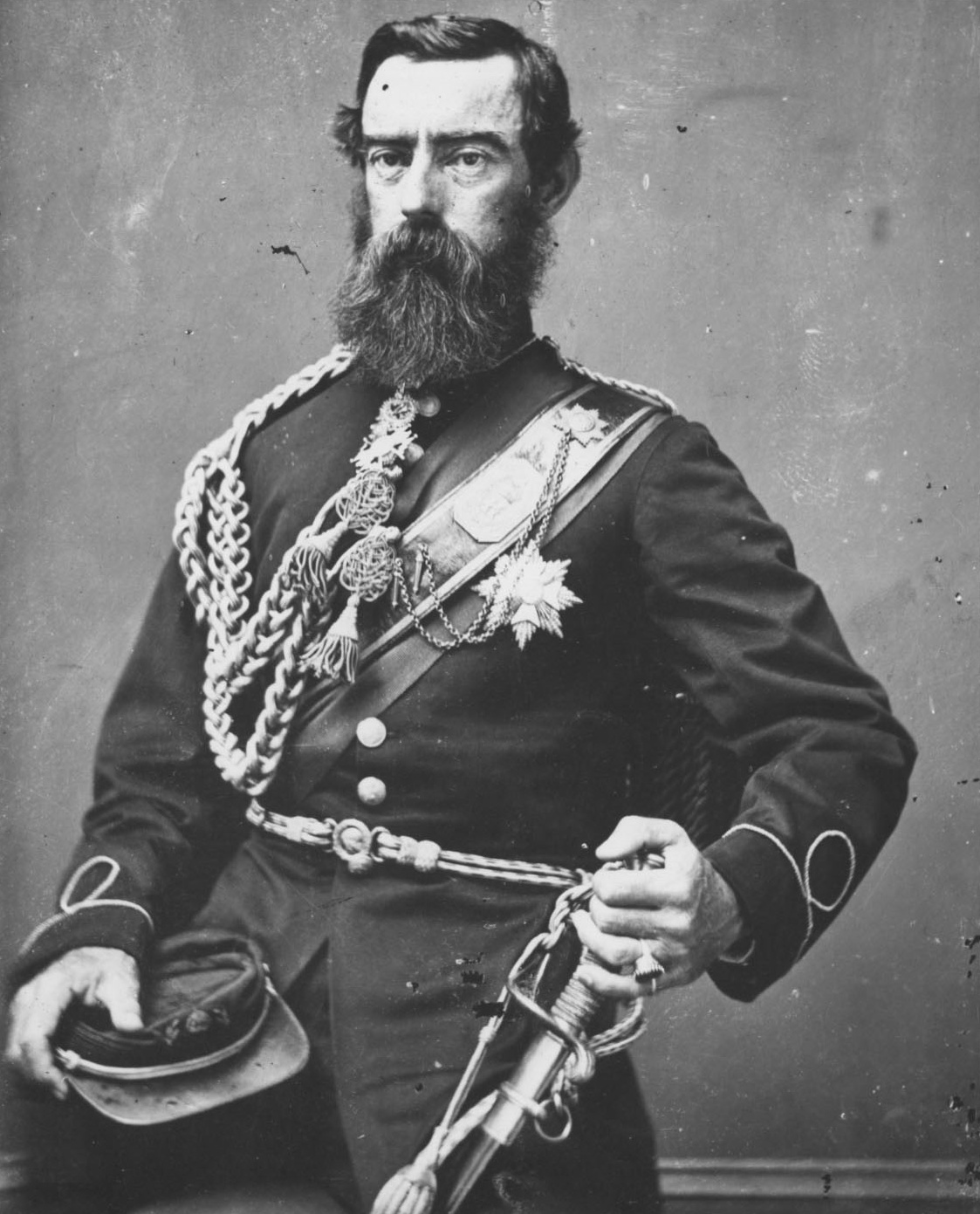

Prince Consort of the Hawaiian Islands
- Tenure: January 29, 1891 – August 27, 1891
- Successor: Position abolished (Anna Prentice Cate as First Lady of the Territory of Hawaii)
- Born: March 10, 1832; Schenectady, New York, U.S.
- Died: August 27, 1891 (aged 59); Washington Place, Honolulu, Oahu, Kingdom of Hawaii
- Burial: September 6, 1891; Mauna Ala Royal Mausoleum
- Spouse: Liliʻuokalani (m. 1862)
- Issue: John ʻAimoku Dominis (illegitimate)
- House: House of Kalākaua
- Father: John Dominis
- Mother: Mary Jones Dominis

John Owen Dominis (March 10, 1832 – August 27, 1891) was prince consort of the Kingdom of Hawaiʻi as the husband of Queen Liliʻuokalani from January 29, 1891, until his death that year. He was the kingdom’s last and only male consort.

== Family ==
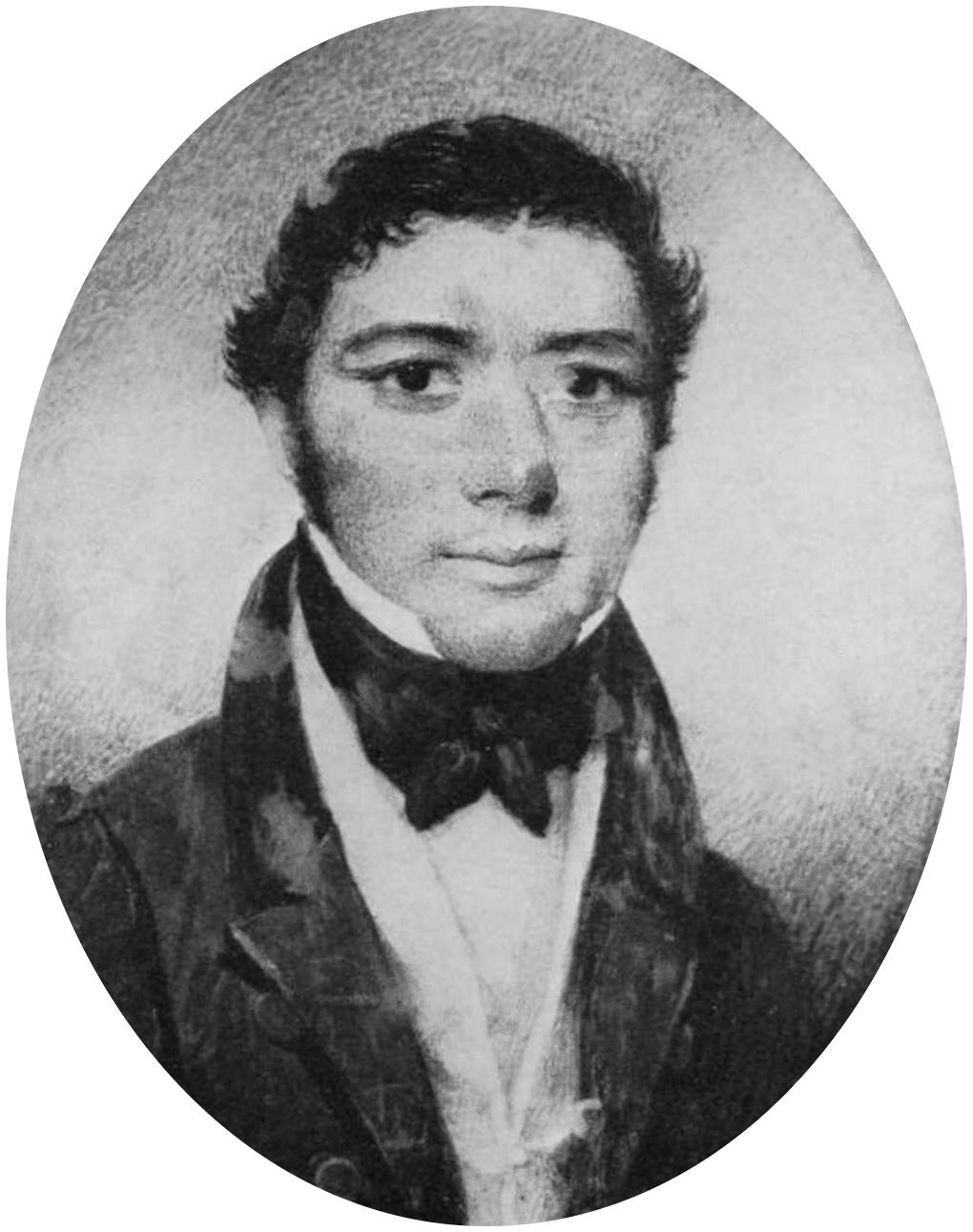
Captain Dominis (1796–1846)

His father was a sea captain named John Dominis (1796–1846) who came to America in 1819 from Trieste during the Napoleonic Wars. He was often called Italian from then a family of Venetian Conti Palatini de Dominis de Arba (Count Palatines of Rab), that had its origins in the island of Rab, in Dalmatia. His mother, Mary Jones, was an American of English descent. Working for Josiah Marshall of Boston, Massachusetts, Captain Dominis sailed from North America across the Pacific, often stopping in Hawaii. One of his ships used on the trading voyages was called "Owhyhee" (an older transcription of 'O Hawai'i). The captain married Mary Lambert Jones (1803–1889), daughter of Owen Jones and Elizabeth Lambert, on October 9, 1821, and had two daughters, Mary Elizabeth (1825–1838) and Frances Ann Dominis (1829–1842). About 1831, they moved to Schenectady, New York, and son John Owen Dominis was born on March 10, 1832.

== Early life ==
In 1837 the captain moved his wife and son from New York to Honolulu, Hawaii, leaving their two daughters at boarding school where they died young. King Kamehameha III awarded some land to the family in 1842 as settlement of a lawsuit with the British Consul Richard Charlton. The captain continued to take voyages to raise money for the construction of a large house. In 1846 he sailed for China on the Brig William Neilson, intending to purchase Chinese-made furniture for the house which was nearing completion. The ship was lost at sea, along with the American Agent George Brown, and Mary became a widow. Mary rented a suite of rooms to support herself and young John Owen. One of the first boarders established the American Legation in the house and named it "Washington Place". It was used as a governor's residence and is now a museum.

John attended a day school run by Mr. and Mrs. Johnston that was next to the Royal School founded for the children of the native Hawaiian nobility. Dominis would climb the fence to look at the princes and princesses, and became friends with them. For a time, Dominis was a mercantile clerk in San Francisco, and later he served as a clerk in a Honolulu commercial house. By 1856 he was on staff to a Prince, and accompanying the royal family on their travels.

== Prince consort ==
On September 16, 1862 Dominis married Lydia Kamakaʻeha Pākī, later Queen Liliʻuokalani, whom he had met during school days. They had been engaged for two years, but had to delay their wedding due to the death of Prince Albert, the young son of King Kamehameha IV. The marriage was not happy. She wanted children of her own, but could not have any. John chose to socialize without her, and Mary Dominis looked down upon her non-caucasian daughter-in-law. Liliʻuokalani notes in her autobiography that his mother considered her an "intruder", but became more affectionate in her later years.

His marriage to Liliʻuokalani and his friendship with King Kamehameha V brought him many honors. For example, he was a Royal Commander of the Royal Order of Kamehameha, the Royal Order of Kalākaua, and several others. From 1863 he served on the King's Privy Council. Dominis served from 1864 to 1886 in the House of Nobles, and from 1868 until his death as Royal Governor of Oʻahu. He served on the Board of Health, Board of Education, Bureau of Immigration, and was Quartermaster General and Commissioner of Crown Lands. From 1878 to 1886 he served as Royal Governor of Maui. In 1886, he was appointed Lieutenant General and Commander in Chief.

According to his wife's testimony, Governor Dominis was a very dedicated freemason and held the 33rd degree.

Mary Dominis died on April 25, 1889, and he and Liliʻuokalani inherited Washington Place. Liliʻuokalani became Queen when her brother King Kalākaua died on January 20, 1891, which made Dominis Prince Consort. Dominis died less than a year later on August 27, 1891, in Washington Place and was buried in the Royal Mausoleum known as Mauna Ala.

== Issue ==
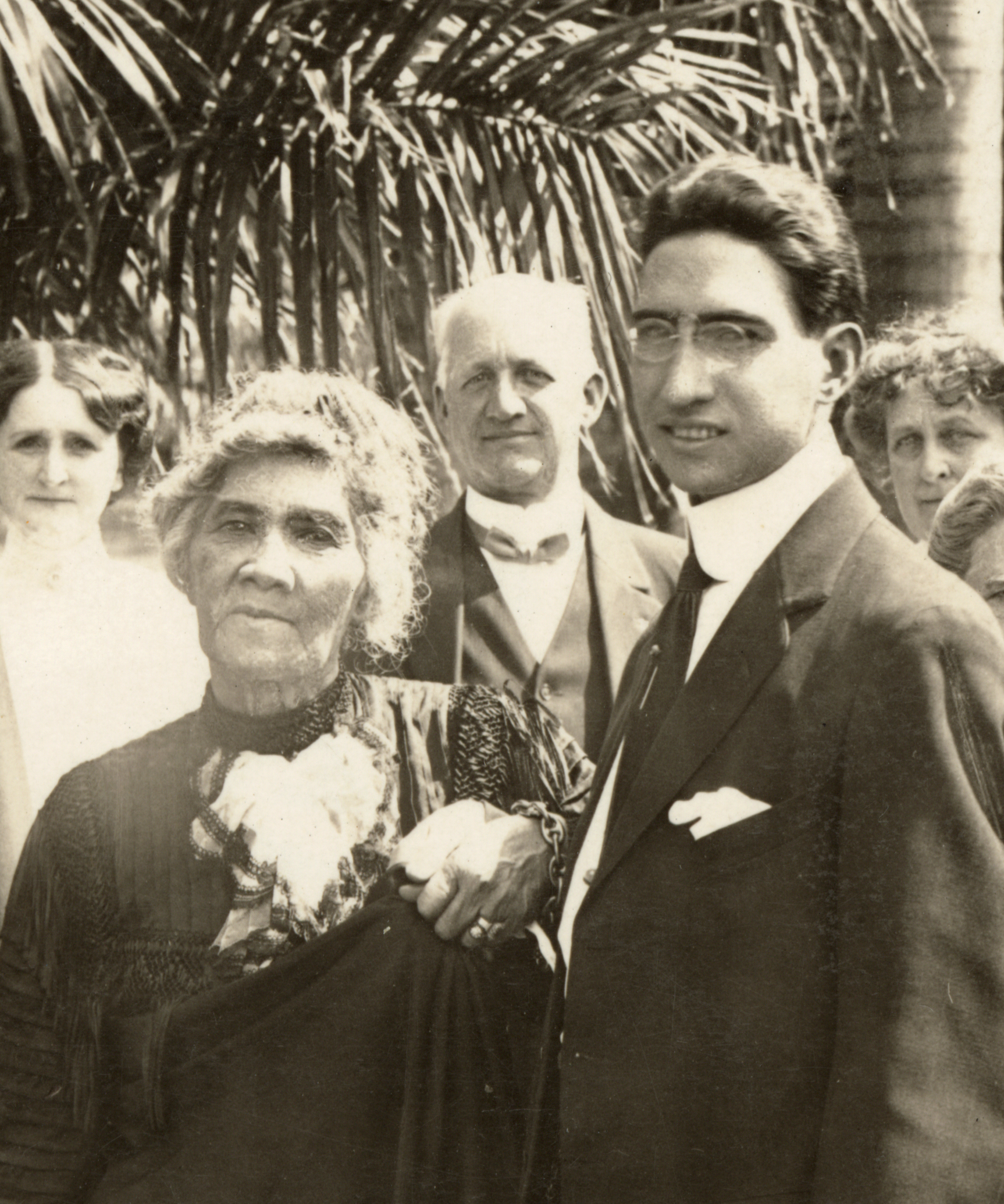
Liliʻuokalani with her stepson John ʻAimoku Dominis

He had a natural son, John ʻAimoku Dominis, with Mary Purdy Lamiki ʻAimoku, a servant of his wife, born January 9, 1883. Liliʻuokalani accepted her husband's constant unfaithfulness and adopted her husband's son in 1910 and changed his name to John ʻAimoku Dominis. He married Sybil McInerny and left descendants. They continued to live at Washington Place until Liliʻuokalani died on November 11, 1917.

== See also ==
- Hawaii's Story by Hawaii's Queen
- List of Hawaiian royal consorts

Government offices
Preceded by Mataio Kekūanaōʻa	Royal Governor of Oahu; 1868–1886; 1887–1888, 1891	Succeeded by Archibald Scott Cleghorn
Preceded by William Luther Moehonua	Royal Governor of Maui; 1878–1886	Succeeded by Robert Hoapili Baker
Preceded by Queen Kapiolani as queen consort	Prince consort of Hawaiʻi; January 20, 1891 – August 27, 1891	Monarchy abolished
