= Rallou Manou =

Greek choreographer and dancer

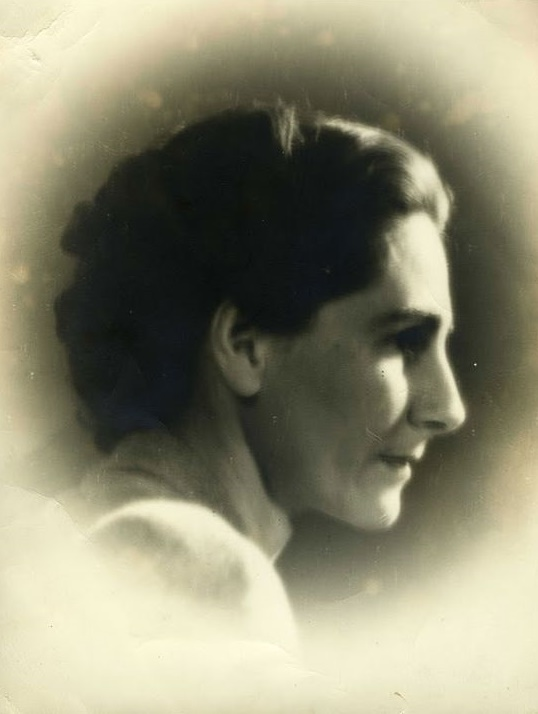
Rallou Manou

Rallou Manou (Greek: Ραλλού Μάνου; 1915–1988) was a Greek choreographer, modern dancer and dance teacher.

== Early life and ancestry ==
She was daughter of Colonel Petros Manos, aide-de-camp of King Constantine I of Greece and his second wife Sofia Tombazis (daughter of Alexandros Tombazis and Princess Maria Mavrocordato). She was half-sister of Aspasia Manos, wife of King Alexander I of Greece, aunt of Queen Alexandra of Yugoslavia and great-aunt of Alexander, Crown Prince of Yugoslavia. Through her other half-sister Roxanne, she was sister in law of an athlete and industrialist Christos Zalokostas.

== Later life ==
She contributed to the development of postwar Greek dance. In 1951, she founded the Hellenic Choreodrama, a group that presented dance-dramas based on Ancient Greek literature. Her works were often performed at the Odeon of Herodes Atticus of Athens. She collaborated with the Greek composers Manos Hadjidakis, Mikis Theodorakis, George Sicilianos and Giorgos Tsangaris. She also collaborated with the Egyptian-born composer Halim El-Dabh, who composed the music for her dance-drama Doxastiko (1965). The sets and costumes of her choreographies were designed by noted Greek artists such a Yiannis Tsarouchis, Nikos Engonopoulos, Nikos Nikolaou, Nikos Hadjikyriakos-Ghikas and Spyros Vassiliou.

== Personal life ==
She was married to the prominent Greek architect Pavlos Mylonas.

== Death ==
She died on 15 October 1988. Her husband Pavlos outlived her by 17 years.
