= Petros Manos =

Greek fencer

Colonel Petros Manos
- Πέτρος Μάνος
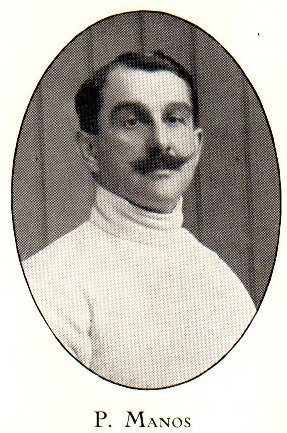
- Petros Manos in fencing dress
- Born: 7 April 1871; Athens, Kingdom of Greece
- Died: 4 April 1918 (aged 46); Switzerland
- Alma mater: Hellenic Army Academy
- Spouse(s): Maria Argyropoulos; Sofia Tombazis
- Children: Aspasia Manos; Roxanne Manou; Rallou Manou
- Relatives: Konstantinos Manos (brother); Alexandra of Greece and Denmark (granddaughter); Alexander of Yugoslavia (great-grandson)
- Military career
- Allegiance: Kingdom of Greece
- Branch: Hellenic Army
- Service years: 1892–1917
- Rank: Colonel
- Conflicts: Greco-Turkish War (1897); Cretan Revolt; Macedonian Struggle; Balkan Wars; First Balkan War; Second Balkan War
- Other work: Member of the HMC; Olympic Athlete

Petros Manos (Greek: Πέτρος Μάνος 7 April 1871 – 4 April 1918) was a Greek military officer and fencer. A colonel in Hellenic Army, he also competed in fencing at the 1912 Summer Olympics. He was the father of Aspasia Manos, wife of King Alexander of Greece.

== Early life and ancestry ==
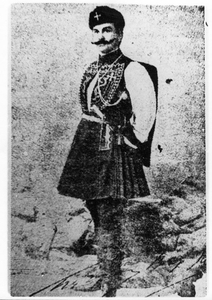
Petros Manos during the Macedonian Struggle

Petros Manos was born in Athens in 1871, as the youngest son of Major general Thrasyvoulos Manos (1835–1922), a member of an old, prominent Phanariote Manos family, and his wife, Roxane Mavromichalis (1848–1905), a member of another old and distinguished Greek family, the Mavromichalis family of Mani.

== Military career ==
He entered the Hellenic Army Academy and graduated in 1892. He fought in the Cretan uprisings of 1896–1897, and participated in the Macedonian Struggle, leading an armed band in 1904–1907 under the nom de guerre Kapetan Vergos (Καπετάν Βέργος). A royalist during the National Schism, as Aide-de-camp to Constantine I, he followed the King into exile in Switzerland in 1917, and died there on 4 April 1918.

== First marriage ==
From his first marriage in Athens on 15 January 1895 with Maria Argyropoulos (August 1874–Capri, 1930), daughter of Jacob Argyropoulos and Aspasia Petrakis, Petros is father of Princess Aspasia of Greece and Denmark (1896–1972) who married King Alexander of Greece (1893–1920) and had child who was Princess Alexandra of Greece and Denmark (1921–1993), who later married King Peter II of Yugoslavia (1923–1970) and also had one child, Alexander, Crown Prince of Yugoslavia (born 17 July 1945). From this marriage he also had one daughter, Roxanne (born 28 February 1898), who became wife of an athlete and later industrialist Christos Zalokostas (1894–1975).

== Second marriage ==
After divorcing his first wife, he contracted second marriage with Sophie Tombazis, daughter of Alexandros Tombazis (son of Georgios Tombazis and Princess Eufrosina Mavrocordato) and his cousin Princess Maria Mavrocordato. His second wife Sophie was direct patrilineal descendant of Iakovos Tombazis (1782–1829), who was first Admiral of the Hellenic Navy during the Greek War of Independence against the Ottoman Empire. With her he had one daughter Rallou (1915–1988), a choreographer, modern dancer and dance teacher, who was married to a prominent Greek architect Pavlos Mylonas.

== Olympic games ==
Petros Manos was also a professional fencer.

As a member of Greek Olympic team he competed in the individual and team épée events at the 1912 Summer Olympics held in Stockholm, Sweden.

== Death ==
Petros Manos died in Switzerland, on 4 April 1918, aged 46.
