= Argyropoulos =

Argyropoulos (Greek: Αργυρόπουλος), is a Greek surname, meaning "son of Argyros". The feminine form is Argyropoulou (Αργυροπούλου).

== Notable members ==
- Emmanouil Argyropoulos (1889–1913), Greek aviator
- John Argyropoulos (1415–1487), Byzantine Renaissance humanist
- Leonidas Argyropoulos (born 1990), Greek football player
- Nikos Argyropoulos (born 1978), Greek basketball player
- Periklis Argyropoulos (admiral) (1871–1953), Greek admiral and diplomat

== See also ==
- Argyropoulos family, a Phanariote noble family
