= Garden of Eden (Venice) =

Building in Venice, Italy

Coordinates: 45°25′25″N 12°20′5″E

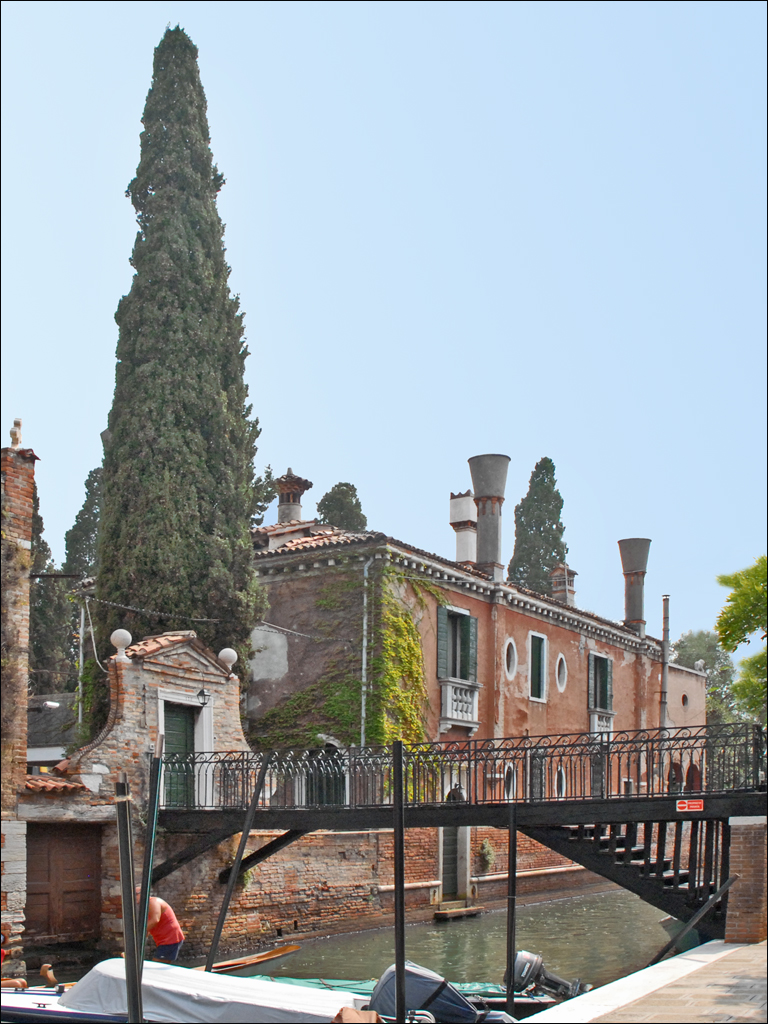
The villa in 2011

The Garden of Eden, also known as the Eden Garden (Italian: Giardino Eden) is a villa with a famous garden, on the island of Giudecca in Venice, Italy. It is named after an Englishman, Frederic Eden, who designed the garden in 1884 and owned the property for a long time. From 1927 it was owned by Princess Aspasia of Greece and Denmark and her daughter Queen Alexandra of Yugoslavia. Between 1979 and 2000, it was owned by the Austrian painter and architect Friedensreich Hundertwasser, who abandoned the garden to nature.

== History ==
In 1884, Frederic Eden (1828-1916), a great-uncle of the British Prime Minister Anthony Eden, and his wife Caroline (1837-1928), sister of the garden designer Gertrude Jekyll, bought an area of six acres on the Venetian island of Giudecca. It contained a former outbuilding of the convent of the Sisters of Santa Croce. The property was later expanded by two acres when the Venetian authorities enlarged the island. The couple created Venice's largest private garden, an English landscape garden symbolic of the British presence in Venice, containing statues, roses and animals. It was frequented by many figures from the world of the arts, including Marcel Proust, Rainer Maria Rilke, Walter Sickert, Henry James, Eleonora Duse and Baron Corvo.

The garden featured a large number of willow pergolas covered in roses, and extensive plantings of Madonna lily as well as other English flowers. Paths around the garden were surfaced with local seashells. There were lawns, courts and a walk lined with cypresses. In 1903, Eden published A Garden in Venice, a short book describing his creation of the garden.

Frederic Eden died in 1916 and his wife Caroline survived him until 1928. A year before her death, she sold the Garden of Eden to Aspasia Manos, the widow of King Alexander of Greece. She acquired the villa thanks to the financial support of her friend Sir James Horlick. The Princess lived in the villa with her daughter Alexandra until 1940, when the Greco-Italian war erupted. Damaged during World War II, the villa was rebuilt by Aspasia when peace returned. In 1945, the Garden of Eden was designated a Monumento Nazionale.

Aspasia lived in the villa until her death in 1972 and the Garden of Eden passed to her daughter. Alexandra made some suicide attempts on the property. In 1979, she sold it to the Austrian painter Friedensreich Hundertwasser. Hundertwasser allowed the flowering plants to die and encouraged wild vegetation. He died in 2000, leaving the property to the ownership of a foundation. It is not open to the public.

== In literature ==
- The Garden of Eden is mentioned in Gabriele D'Annunzio's novel The Flame (Il fuoco, 1900)
- It was mentioned by Jean Cocteau in the poem Souvenir d'un soir d'automne au jardin Eden (1909)

== Bibliography ==
- Frederic Eden, A Garden in Venice, Kessinger Publishing, 2010 (facsimile of the 1903 original), ISBN 1166507017
- John Hall, "The Garden of Eden", Hortus, no. 67, autumn 2003
- (in French) Alexandra of Yugoslavia, Pour l'amour de mon roi, Paris, Gallimard, 1957, ASIN B004LXRKPK
- Ottewill, David (1989). The Edwardian Garden. New Haven: Yale University Press. ISBN 0-300-04338-4.
