= Periklis Argyropoulos =

Greek naval officer, politician and diplomat

Periklis Argyropoulos (Greek: Περικλής Ι. Αργυρόπουλος; 1871–1953) was a Greek naval officer, politician and diplomat.

== Biography ==
Born in Athens in 1871, he became a naval officer and retired with the rank of rear admiral. During the First Balkan War, he commanded the torpedo boat No. 14, and on 9 November 1912, he sunk the wooden Ottoman armed steamer Trabzon off Ayvalık. In 1917, he served in the short-lived cabinet of Alexandros Zaimis as Transport Minister, and again in the same post in 1926 under Athanasios Eftaxias. During the Metaxas Regime, he was appointed ambassador to Spain. He died in 1953. He was also the maternal uncle to Aspasia Manos, the wife of King Alexander of Greece.
