= Alexandra of Yugoslavia =

Queen of Yugoslavia from 1944 to 1945

Alexandra
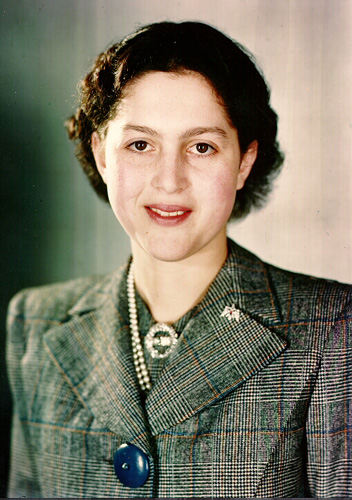

Queen consort of Yugoslavia
- Tenure: 20 March 1944 – 29 November 1945
- Born: 25 March 1921; Athens, Greece
- Died: 30 January 1993 (aged 71); Burgess Hill, West Sussex, England
- Burial: Royal Cemetery, Tatoi Palace, Greece (1993–2013); Royal Mausoleum Oplenac, Topola, Serbia (since 2013)
- Spouse: Peter II of Yugoslavia (m. 1944; died 1970)
- Issue: Alexander, Crown Prince of Yugoslavia
- House: Glücksburg
- Father: Alexander of Greece
- Mother: Aspasia Manos
- Religion: Eastern Orthodox

Alexandra (Greek: Αλεξάνδρα, Serbo-Croatian: Александра/Aleksandra, in 1922 retroactively recognised as Princess Alexandra of Greece and Denmark; 25 March 1921 – 30 January 1993) was the last Queen of Yugoslavia as the wife of King Peter II.

Posthumous daughter of King Alexander of Greece and his morganatic wife, Aspasia Manos, Alexandra was not part of the Greek royal family until July 1922 when, at the behest of Queen Sophia, Alexander's mother, a law was passed which retroactively recognized marriages of members of the royal family, although on a non-dynastic basis; in consequence, she obtained the style and name of Her Royal Highness Princess Alexandra of Greece and Denmark. At the same time, a serious political and military crisis, linked to the defeat of Greece by Turkey in Anatolia, led to the deposition and exile of the royal family, beginning in 1924. Being the only members of the dynasty allowed to remain in the country by the Second Hellenic Republic, the princess and her mother later found refuge in Italy with Dowager Queen Sophia.

After three years with her paternal grandmother, Alexandra left Florence to continue her studies in the United Kingdom, while her mother settled in Venice. Separated from her mother, the princess fell ill, forcing Aspasia to make her leave the boarding school where she was studying. After the restoration of her uncle, King George II, on the Hellenic throne in 1935, Alexandra stayed in her native country several times but the outbreak of the Greco-Italian War, in 1940, forced her and her mother to settle in Athens. The invasion of Greece by the Axis powers in April–May 1941, however, led to their moving to the United Kingdom. Again exiled, Alexandra met in London the young King Peter II of Yugoslavia, who also went into exile after the invasion of his country by the Germans.

Quickly, Alexandra and Peter II fell in love and planned to marry. Opposition from both Peter's mother, Maria, and the Yugoslav government in exile forced the couple to delay their marriage plans until 1944, when they finally celebrated their wedding. (Note: The marriage was sponsored by the British, as a way to endorse the proposed Greek–Yugoslav confederation.) A year later, Alexandra gave birth to her only son, Alexander, Crown Prince of Yugoslavia. However, the happiness of the family was short-lived: on 29 November 1945, Marshal Tito proclaimed the Federal People's Republic of Yugoslavia and Alexandra, who had never set foot in her adopted country, was left without a crown. The abolition of the Yugoslav monarchy had very serious consequences for the royal couple. Penniless and unable to adapt to the role of citizen, Peter II turned to alcoholism and multiple affairs with other women. Depressed by the behavior of her husband, Alexandra neglected her son and made several suicide attempts. After the death of Peter II in 1970, Alexandra's health continued to deteriorate. She died of cancer in 1993. Her remains were buried in the Royal Cemetery Plot in the park of Tatoi, in Greece, before being transferred to the Royal Mausoleum of Oplenac in 2013.

== Life ==
=== A birth surrounded by intrigues ===
==== The issue of the Greek succession ====
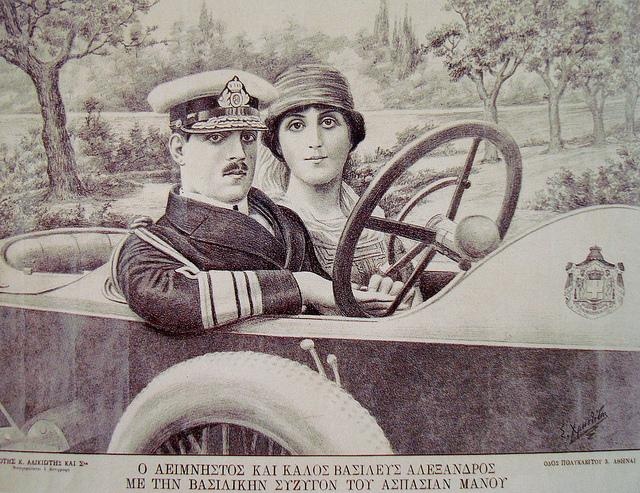
Lithograph of King Alexander of Greece and Aspasia Manos, Alexandra's parents, ca. 1920.

Five months before Alexandra's birth, her father, King Alexander, died of sepsis following a monkey bite which occurred in the gardens of Tatoi. The unexpected death of the sovereign caused a serious political crisis in Greece, at a time when public opinion was already divided by the events of the World War I and the Greco-Turkish War. The King had concluded an unequal marriage with Aspasia Manos, (Note: The ancestors of Aspasia Manos were of the high Phanariot aristocracy and she counted several Voivodes of the Danubian Principalities among her ancestors; however, her rank was deemed insufficient to allow her to marry a member of European royalty. Hence, Alexander's wedding was not approved by either his family, the Hellenic Government or Metropolitan Meletius III of Greece.) and, in consequence, their offspring was not dynastic. Due to the lack of another candidate for the throne, Prime Minister Eleftherios Venizelos was soon forced to accept the restoration of his enemy, King Constantine I, on 19 December 1920. Alexander's brief reign was officially treated as a regency, which meant that his marriage, contracted without his father's permission, was technically illegal, the marriage void, and the couple's posthumous child illegitimate.

The last months of pregnancy of Aspasia are surrounded by intrigue. In the case that she gave birth to a boy (who would be named Philip, as the father of Alexander the Great), rumours soon assured that she was determined to place him on the throne after his birth. True or not, this possibility worried the Greek royal family, whose fears about the birth of a male child were exploited by the Venizelists to revive the succession crisis. The birth of a girl, on 25 March 1921, was a great relief for the dynasty, (Note: Greek crown descended according to a semi-Salic law until 1952; in consequence, princesses could not claim the throne.) and both King Constantine I and his mother, Queen Dowager Olga, agreed to be the godparents of the newborn.

==== Integration into the royal family ====
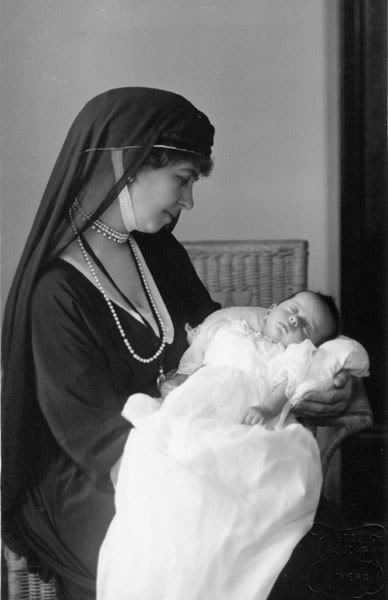
Queen Sophia of Greece holding her granddaughter Alexandra, April 1921.

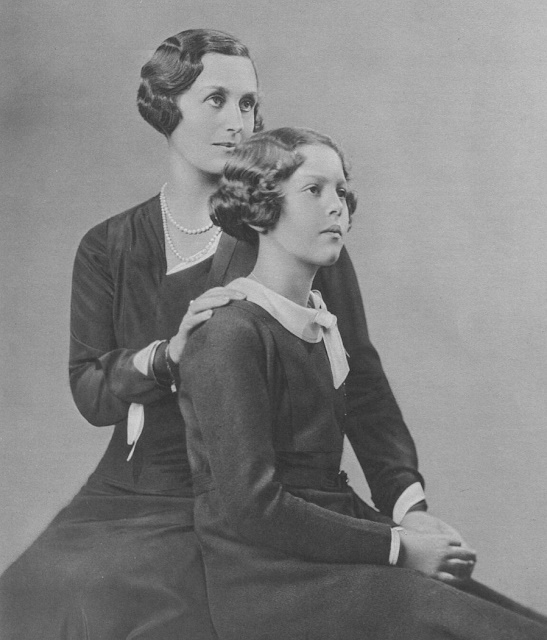
Aspasia and Alexandra

Still, neither Alexandra nor Aspasia received more official recognition: from a legal point of view, they were commoners without any rights in the royal family. Things changed from July 1922 when, after the intervention of Queen Sophia, a law was passed which retroactively recognized marriages of members of the royal family, although on a non-dynastic basis; with this legal subterfuge, the princess obtained the style of Royal Highness and the title of Princess of Greece and Denmark. Thus, Alexandra's birth became legitimate in the eyes of Greek law, but since the marriage was recognized on a 'non-dynastic basis', her royal status was tenuous at best and she remained ineligible for the throne; however, this belated recognition made it possible for her to later make an advantageous marriage, which would not have been possible if she were nothing more than the daughter of the King's morganatic spouse.

Aspasia, however, was not mentioned in the law and remained a commoner in the eyes of protocol. Humiliated by this difference in treatment, she begged Prince Christopher (whose commoner wife, Nancy Stewart Worthington Leeds, was entitled to be known as a Princess of Greece and Denmark), to intercede on her behalf. Moved by the arguments of his niece-in-law, he approached Queen Sophia, who eventually changed her opinion. Under pressures from his wife, King Constantine I issued a decree, gazetted 10 September 1922 under which Aspasia received the title Princess of Greece and Denmark and the style of Royal Highness.

=== Childhood in exile ===
==== From Athens to Florence ====
Despite these positive developments, the situation of Alexandra and her mother did not improve. Indeed, Greece experiencing a series of military defeats by Turkey and a coup d'état soon forced King Constantine I to abdicate again, this time in favor of his eldest son, Crown Prince George, on 27 September 1922. Things went from bad to worse for the country; a further coup forced the new king, his wife and his brother to leave the country on 19 December 1923. On 25 March 1924, Alexandra's third birthday, the Second Hellenic Republic was proclaimed and both Aspasia and Alexandra were then the only members of the dynasty allowed to stay in Greece.

Penniless, Aspasia chose to take the path of exile with her daughter in early 1924. The two princesses found refuge with Queen Sophia, who had moved to the Villa Bobolina near Florence, shortly after the death of her husband on 11 January 1923. The now dowager queen, who loved Alexandra, was thrilled, even if her financial situation was also precarious. With her paternal grandmother, the princess spent a happy childhood with her aunts Crown Princess Helen of Romania, Princesses Irene and Katherine of Greece, and her cousins Prince Philip of Greece (the future Duke of Edinburgh) and Prince Michael of Romania, who were her playmates during holidays.

==== From London to Venice ====
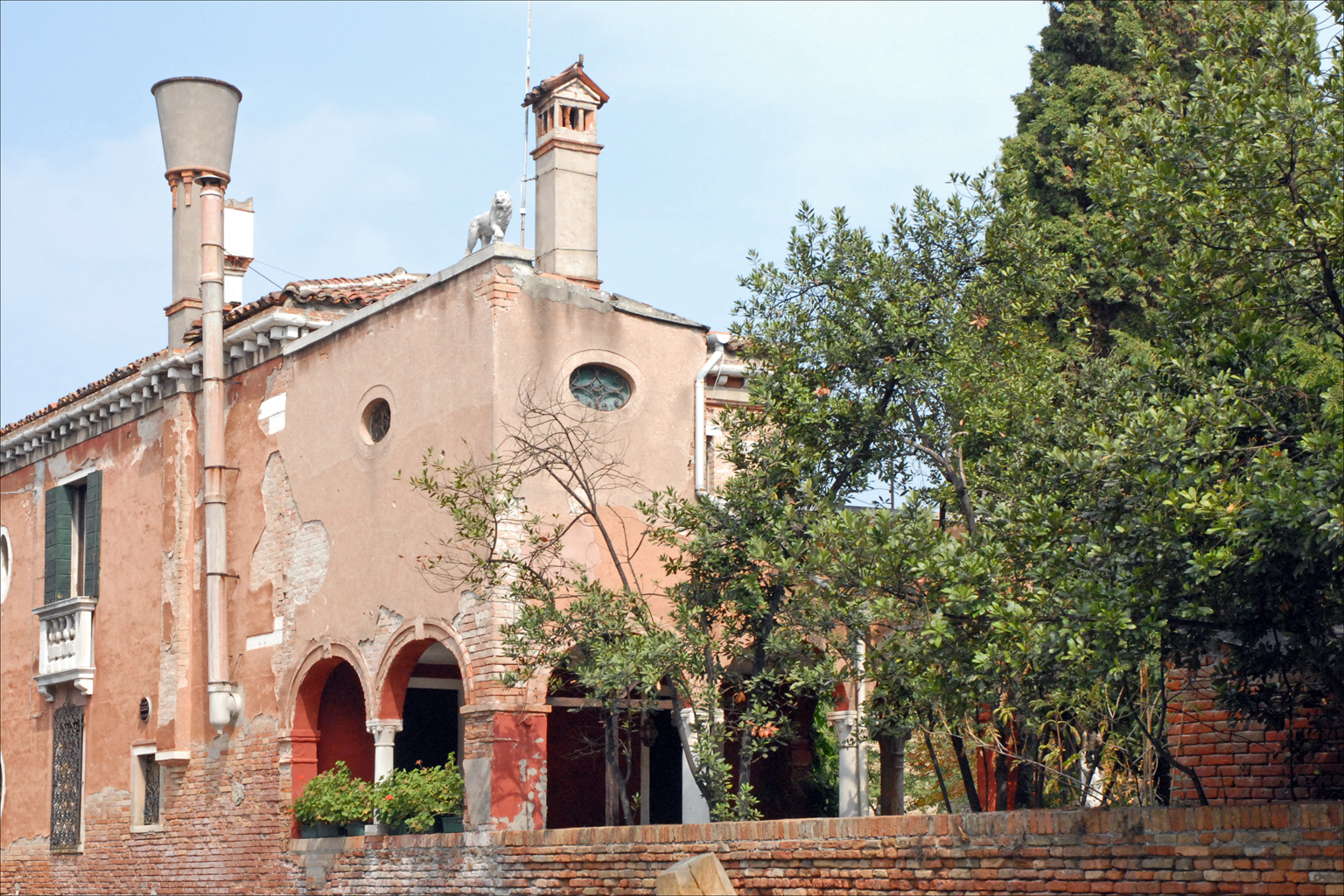
Alexandra'a new family home: Garden of Eden, Venice

In 1927, Alexandra and her mother moved to Ascot, Berkshire, in the United Kingdom. They were greeted by Sir James Horlick, 4th Baronet, and his Horlick family, who harbored them in their Cowley Manor estate near the hippodrome. Now seven years old, Alexandra was enrolled in boarding schools in Westfield and Heathfield, as was the custom for the upper class. However, the Princess took very badly to this experience: separated from her mother, she stopped eating and eventually contracted tuberculosis. Alarmed, Aspasia thus moved her daughter to Switzerland for treatment. Later, Alexandra was educated in a Parisian finishing school, during which time she and her mother stayed at the Hotel Crillon.

Eventually, the two princesses settled on the island of Giudecca in Venice, where Aspasia acquired a small property with her savings and Horlick's financial support. The former home of Caroline Carry Eden (1837–1928), sister of the garden designer Gertrude Jekyll and widow of Frederic Eden (1828–1916), a relative of the future British Prime Minister Anthony Eden, 1st Earl of Avon, the villa and its 3.6 hectares of landscaped grounds were nicknamed the Garden of Eden, which delighted the Greek Princesses.

=== Restoration of the Greek monarchy ===
==== Between Greece and Venice ====
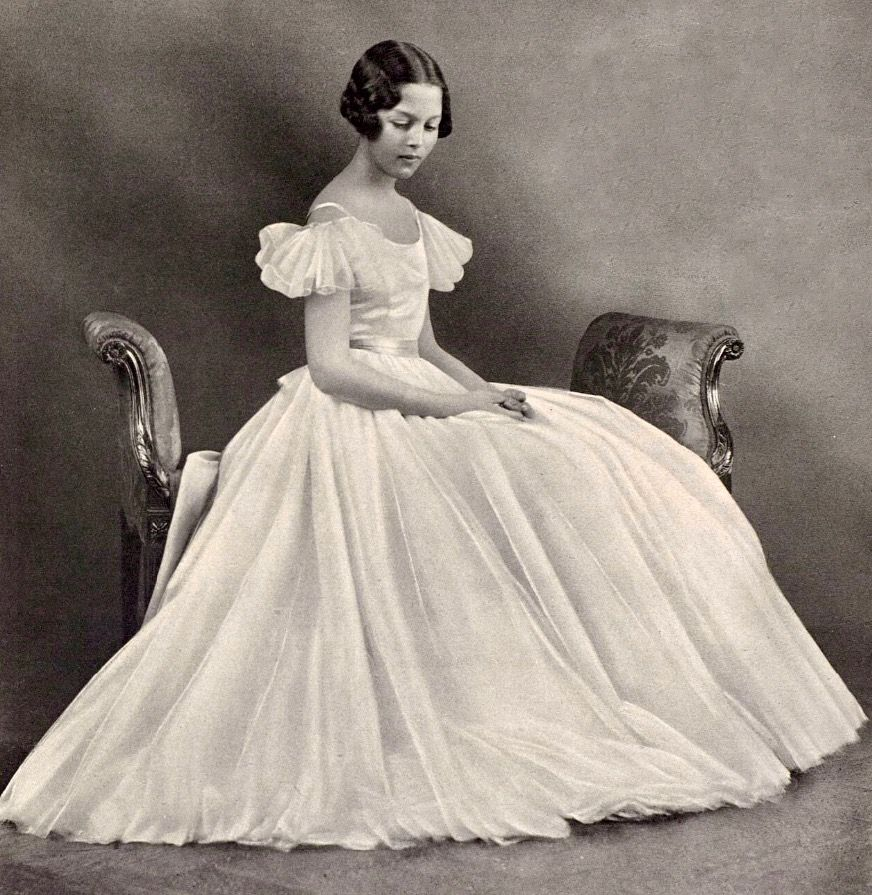
Princess Alexandra of Greece and Denmark as a girl in 1934

In 1935, the Second Hellenic Republic was abolished and King George II (Alexandra's uncle) was restored to the throne after a referendum organized by General Georgios Kondylis. Alexandra was then allowed to return to Greece, a country she had not seen since 1924. Although she continued to reside in Venice with her mother (who still suffered the ostracism of the royal family), the princess was invited to all the great ceremonies that punctuate the life of the dynasty. In 1936, she participated in the official ceremonies which marked the reburial in Tatoi of the remains of King Constantine I, Queen Sophia, and Dowager Queen Olga; all three died in exile in Italy. Two years later, in 1938, she was invited to the wedding of her uncle, Crown Prince Paul, with Princess Frederica of Hanover.

Despite her participation in the ceremonies of the Greek royal family, at that time Alexandra understood that she was not a full member of the European royalty. Her mother had to claim in her name the share of the inheritance of Alexandra's paternal grandparents. Also, the princess' mother had no site in the royal necropolis of Tatoi. During the 1936 ceremonies, a chapel was arranged in the park of the palace for the remains of King Constantine I and Queen Sophia. The remains of King Alexander − previously based in the gardens next to his grandfather King George I – were then transferred to this chapel, with no space reserved for Aspasia.

==== First marriage proposal ====
In 1936, the fifteen-years-old Princess received her first marriage proposal: King Zog I of Albania, who wished to marry a member of the European royalty in order to consolidate his position, asked her hand. However, the Greek diplomacy, which maintained complex relations with the Kingdom of Albania because of the possession of Northern Epirus, rejected this proposal and King Zog I eventually married the Hungarian Countess Géraldine Apponyi de Nagy-Appony in 1938.

Alexandra attended numerous dances, which aimed to introduce her to the European elite. In 1937 she was presented in Paris, where she danced with her cousin, the Duke of Windsor, then residing in France with his wife, the Duchess, after his abdication and subsequent marriage.

=== World War II ===
==== From Venice to London ====
The outbreak of the Greco-Italian War on 28 October 1940 forced Alexandra and her mother suddenly to leave Venice and fascist Italy. They settled with the rest of the Royal Family in Athens. Eager to serve their country in this difficult moment, both Princesses became nurses alongside the other women of the Royal Family. However, after several months of victorious battles against the Italian forces, Greece was invaded by the army of Nazi Germany on 6 April 1941.

Alexandra and the majority of the members of the Royal Family left the country a few days later, on 22 April. After a brief stay in Crete, where they received a German bombing, the Greek Royal Family departed for Egypt and South Africa. While several members of the Royal Family were forced to spend World War II in South Africa, Alexandra and her mother obtained the permission of King George II of Greece and the British government to move to the United Kingdom. They arrived at Liverpool in the autumn of 1941 and settled in London in the district of Mayfair. In the British capital, the Greek princesses resumed their activities in the Red Cross. Better accepted than in their own country, they were regular guests of the Duchess of Kent (born Princess Marina of Greece) and of the future Duke of Edinburgh (born Prince Philip of Greece), who was rumoured to be briefly engaged to Alexandra.

==== Love and marriage ====
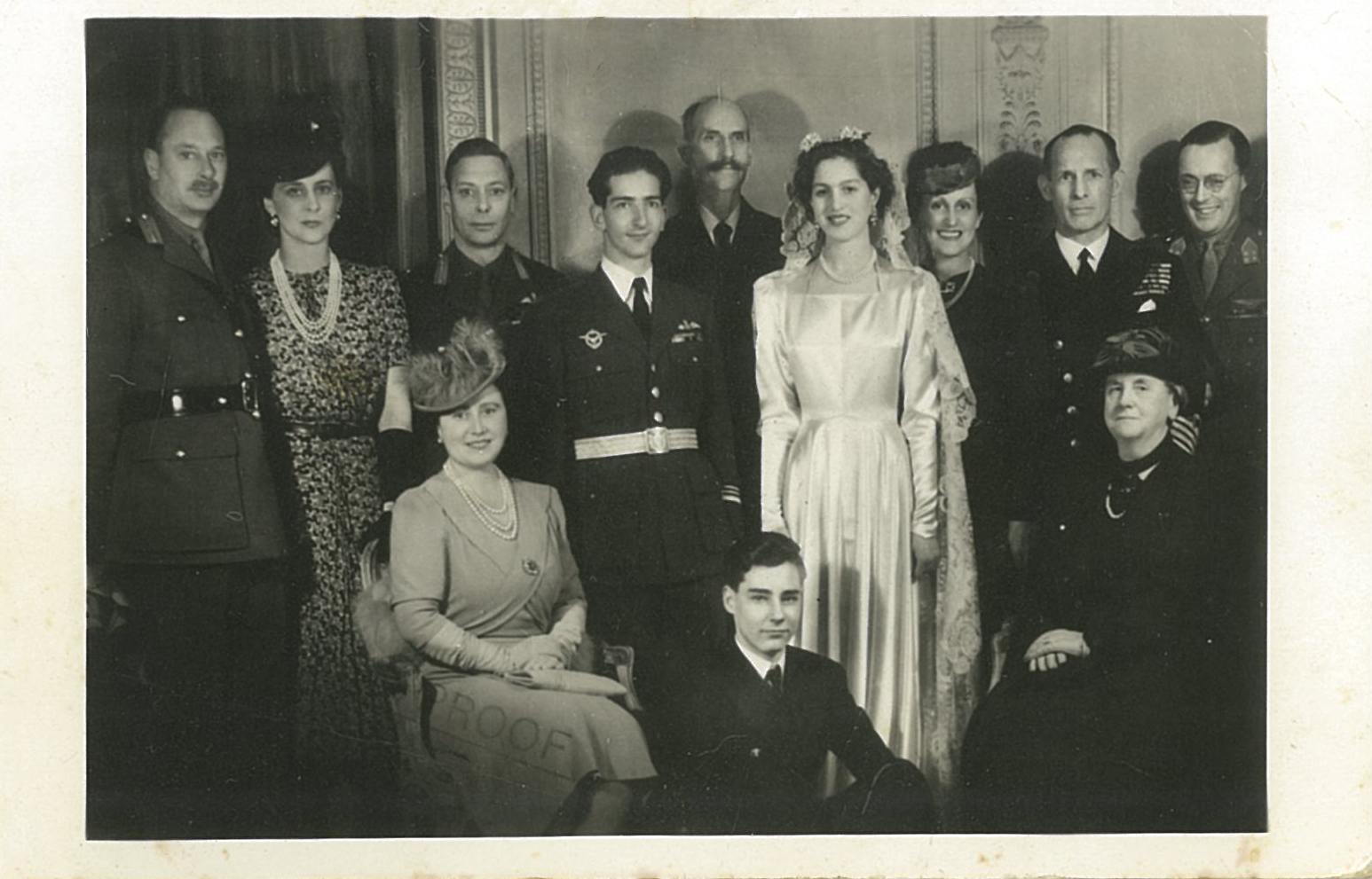
Marriage of King Peter II of Yugoslavia and Princess Alexandra of Greece and Denmark, 20 March 1944, London, England.

However, it was not her cousin Philip whom Alexandra finally married. In 1942, the Princess met her third cousin, (Note: Both were great-great-grandchildren of Queen Victoria, Alexandra through her paternal grandmother Sophia, queen of the Hellenes, and Peter II through his maternal grandmother, Marie, queen of Romania) King Peter II of Yugoslavia in an officers' gala at Grosvenor House. The 19-year-old sovereign had lived in exile in London since the invasion of his country by the Axis powers on 6 April 1941. Quickly, they fell in love with each other and considered marriage, which greatly delighted Princess Aspasia. However, the sharp opposition of Queen Maria of Yugoslavia, Peter II's mother, and the Yugoslav government-in-exile, which deemed it indecent to celebrate a wedding while Yugoslavia was dismembered and occupied, prevented for a while the marital project. For two years, the lovers had only brief meetings in the residence of the Duchess of Kent.

After a brief stay of Peter II in Cairo, Egypt, the couple finally married on 20 March 1944. The ceremony, at which the King's mother refused to participate, citing toothache, was held at the Yugoslav embassy in London. Marked by restrictions due to the war, Alexandra wore a wedding dress that was lent her by Lady Mary Lygon, wife of Prince Vsevolod Ivanovich of Russia (himself the son of King Peter's aunt Princess Helen of Serbia). Among the guests at the ceremony, there were four reigning monarchs (George VI of the United Kingdom, George II of Greece, Haakon VII of Norway and Wilhelmina of the Netherlands) and several other members of European royalty, including the two brothers of the groom (Prince Tomislav and Prince Andrew), the mother of the bride, Prince Henry, Duke of Gloucester and Prince Bernhard of Lippe-Biesterfeld, son-in-law of Queen Wilhelmina.

=== Queen in exile ===
==== Liberation of Yugoslavia and the communist victory ====
Royal Standard of the Queen

Now Queen of Yugoslavia, Alexandra, however, had tenuous links with her new country, living under the Nazi occupation. In 1941, a large portion of the Yugoslav territory was annexed by the Axis powers. Crown Prince Michael of Montenegro refused to resurrect his ancient Kingdom under Italian and German protection and guidance, and thus the region of Montenegro had been transformed into a governorate by fascist Italy. Finally, the other two main parts of Yugoslavia were reduced to puppet states: the Serbia of General Milan Nedić and the Croatian Kingdom of the Ustaše. (Note: The crown of Croatia was given to Alexandra's uncle Prince Aimone, Duke of Aosta (husband of Princess Irene of Greece), but he refused to settle to his new country.) As all over occupied Europe, Yugoslav civilians suffered the abuses of the invaders and collaborators who supported them. Two groups emerged in the country: the Chetniks, led by monarchist General Draža Mihailović, and the Partisans, led by the communist Marshal Josip Broz Tito.

From London, the Yugoslav government-in-exile supported the struggle of the royalist forces and appointed General Mihailović as Chief Minister of War. However, the importance of the Partisans pushed the allied forces to trust the Communists and give increasingly limited help to Mihailović, who was accused of collaborating with the Axis powers to shoot communist guerrillas. After the Tehran Conference (1943), the Allies finally broke their ties with the Chetniks, forcing the Yugoslav government-in-exile to recognize the preeminence of the Partisans.

In June 1944, Prime Minister Ivan Šubašić officially appointed Marshal Tito as the head of the Yugoslav resistance and Mihailović was dismissed. In October 1944, Churchill and Stalin concluded an agreement to split Yugoslavia into two occupation zones, but after the liberation of Belgrade by the Red Army and the Partisans, it became clear the Communists predominated in the country. A harsh treatment, which affected the monarchists, took place; at the request of Churchill, Tito agreed in March 1945 to recognize a Regency Council (which had almost no activity) but opposed the return of King Peter II, who had to remain in exile with Alexandra while a government coalition dominated by the Communists was constituted in Belgrade.

==== Birth of Crown Prince Alexander and Peter II's deposition ====
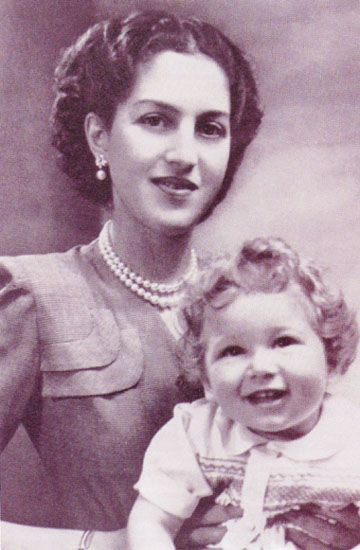
Alexandra with her son, Crown Prince Alexander of Yugoslavia

In this turbulent context, Alexandra gave birth to an heir, named Alexander after his two grandfathers, Alexander of Yugoslavia and Alexander of Greece. The birth took place in Suite 212 of Claridge's Hotel in Brook Street, London, on 17 July 1945. To enable the child to be born on Yugoslav soil, the British Prime Minister Winston Churchill reportedly asked King George VI to issue a decree transforming, for a day, Suite 212 into Yugoslav territory, which was to be the only time Alexandra was in Yugoslavia as queen. On 24 October 1945, the newborn Crown Prince was baptized by the Serbian Patriarch Gavrilo V in Westminster Abbey, with King George VI and his elder daughter (the future Queen Elizabeth II) acting as godparents.

The festivities marking the birth of the crown prince, however, were short-lived. Less than eight months after joining the coalition government, Milan Grol and Ivan Šubašić resigned their offices of Vice-Prime Minister (18 August) and Foreign Minister (8 October), respectively, to mark their political disagreement with Marshal Tito. Faced with the rise of the Communists, King Peter II decided, to withdraw his confidence from the Regency Council and regain all his sovereign prerogatives in Yugoslavia (8 August). Tito responded by immediately depriving the Royal Family of the civil list, which was soon to have dramatic consequences in the lives of the royal couple. Especially, Tito ordered the organization of early elections to a Constituent Assembly. The campaign took place in an irregular way, in the middle of pressures and violence of all kinds, with the opposition deciding to boycott the poll. On 24 November 1945 a single list presented by the communists was proposed to voters: while there were hardly more than 10,000 Communists throughout the Kingdom of Yugoslavia before the war, their candidates list obtained more than 90% of the votes in the referendum.

In their first meeting on 29 November 1945, the Constituent Assembly voted immediately to abolish the monarchy and proclaimed the Federal People's Republic of Yugoslavia. While no referendum accompanied this institutional change, the new regime was quickly recognized by virtually all of the international countries (except Francoist Spain).

=== Marital problems and suicide attempts ===
==== Financial and marital difficulties ====
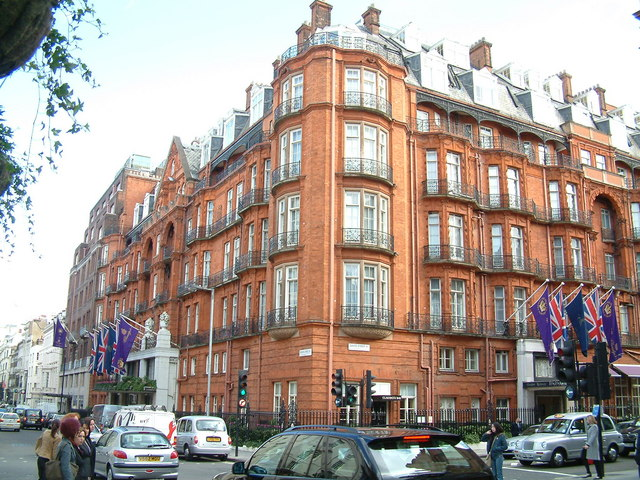
Crown Prince Alexander's birthplace: Claridge's Hotel, London.

Now without income and any prospect of returning to Yugoslavia, Peter II and Alexandra resolved to leave Claridge's Hotel and moved to a mansion in the Borough of Runnymede. Abandoned by the British government, they settled for a time in France, between Paris and Monte Carlo, then in Switzerland at St. Moritz. Increasingly penniless, they ended up leaving Europe and in 1949, they settled in New York City, where the former King hoped to complete a financial project. Still penniless, the couple was forced to sell Alexandra's necklace of emeralds and other pieces of her jewelry to pay their accumulated debts. In addition to these difficulties was the fact that they were unable to manage a budget. As Alexandra wrote in her autobiography, she had no idea of the value of things, and she quickly proved incapable of maintaining a home.

In the United States, Peter II soon drifted away. Having made poor financial investments, he lost the little money he had left. Unable to adapt to the daily life of a normal citizen, he turned to alcohol and affairs with other women. Likely prone to anorexia for years, she made her first suicide attempt during a visit to her mother in Venice during the summer of 1950.

The relations of the royal couple went from bad to worse. Thanks to the intervention of his maternal grandmother, the 4-year-old former Crown Prince Alexander was sent to Italy with the Count and Countess of Robilant, friends of the royal couple. The child then grew up in an atmosphere much more stable and loving, with only a few visits from his parents.

==== Divorce attempt and reconciliation ====
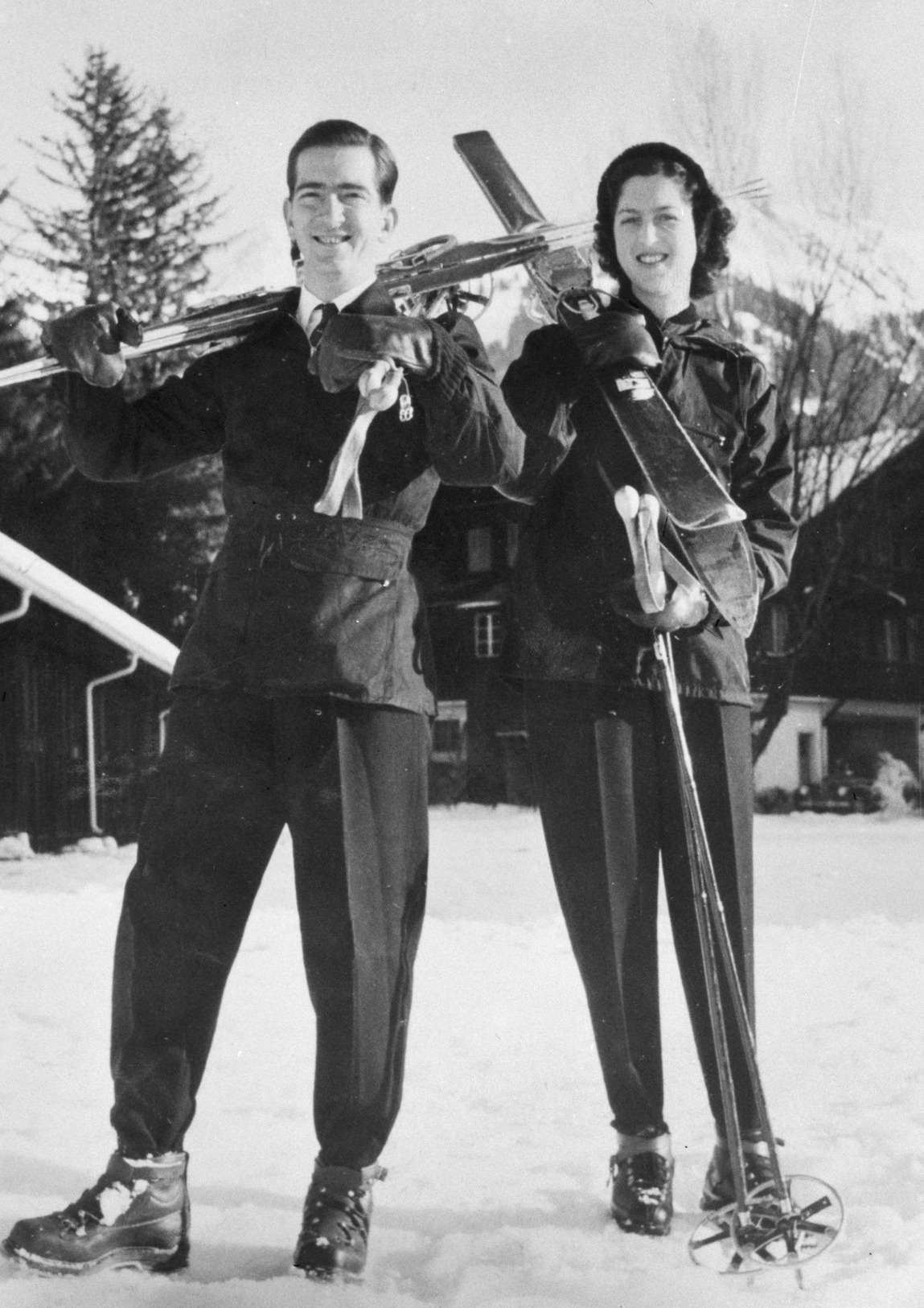
Peter II and Alexandra in Gstaad, Switzerland (1963)

The year 1952 was marked by further financial problems due to bad investments of Peter II. Alexandra also suffered a miscarriage. The couple returned to France, where the situation did not improve. In 1953, Alexandra made another suicide attempt in Paris, which she survived thanks to a phone call from her aunt, Queen Frederica of Greece. Tired of the poor mental health of his wife, Peter II finally launched a process of divorce in the French courts. The intervention of his son the crown prince and the King and Queen of Greece convinced him, however, to abandon his intentions.

The couple reconciled and for a time they lived a second honeymoon. However, the need for money continued to be felt and Alexandra was persuaded by a British publisher to write her autobiography. With the help of the ghostwriter Joan Reeder, in 1956 she published For Love of a King (translated into French the following year under the title Pour l'Amour de mon Roi). Alexandra was always in financial need despite the relative success of the book. In 1959, she co-wrote a second book, this time about her cousin, the Duke of Edinburgh. Though it revealed nothing compromising about the Duke of Edinburgh, the book prompted the British royal family to distance itself from Alexandra.

For some time, the couple moved to Cannes, while Peter II maintained a chancellery in Monte Carlo. Considering himself still King of Yugoslavia, the former sovereign continued to award titles and decorations. Supported by some monarchists as the "Duke of Saint-Bar", he even maintained an embassy in Madrid. However, the reconciliation of the royal couple finally soured and Peter II returned to live in the United States while Alexandra moved with her mother to the Garden of Eden.

In 1963, on 1 September or before, Alexandra made another suicide attempt in Venice. Narrowly saved by her son former Crown Prince Alexander, she spent a long period of convalescence under the constant care of her sister-in-law, Princess Margarita of Baden (wife of Peter II's brother Prince Tomislav of Yugoslavia). Once recovered, Alexandra reconciled again with Peter II and the couple returned to live in the French capital in 1967. But, as before, the reconciliation was temporary and soon Peter II returned to live permanently in the United States while Alexandra settled in her mother's residence.

=== Last years ===
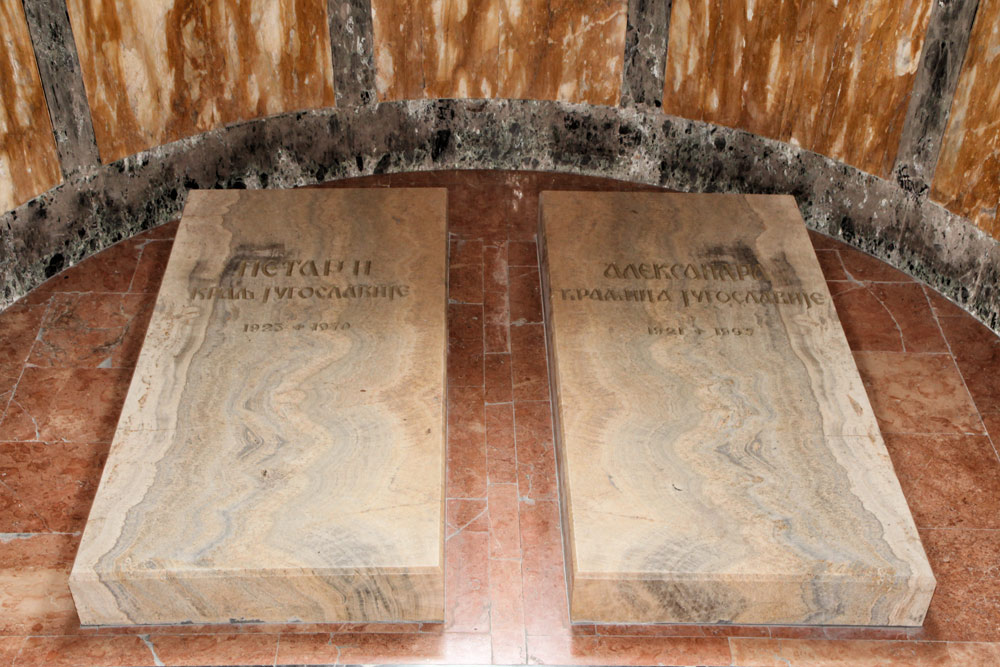
Alexandra and Peter's grave at Royal Mausoleum in Oplenac

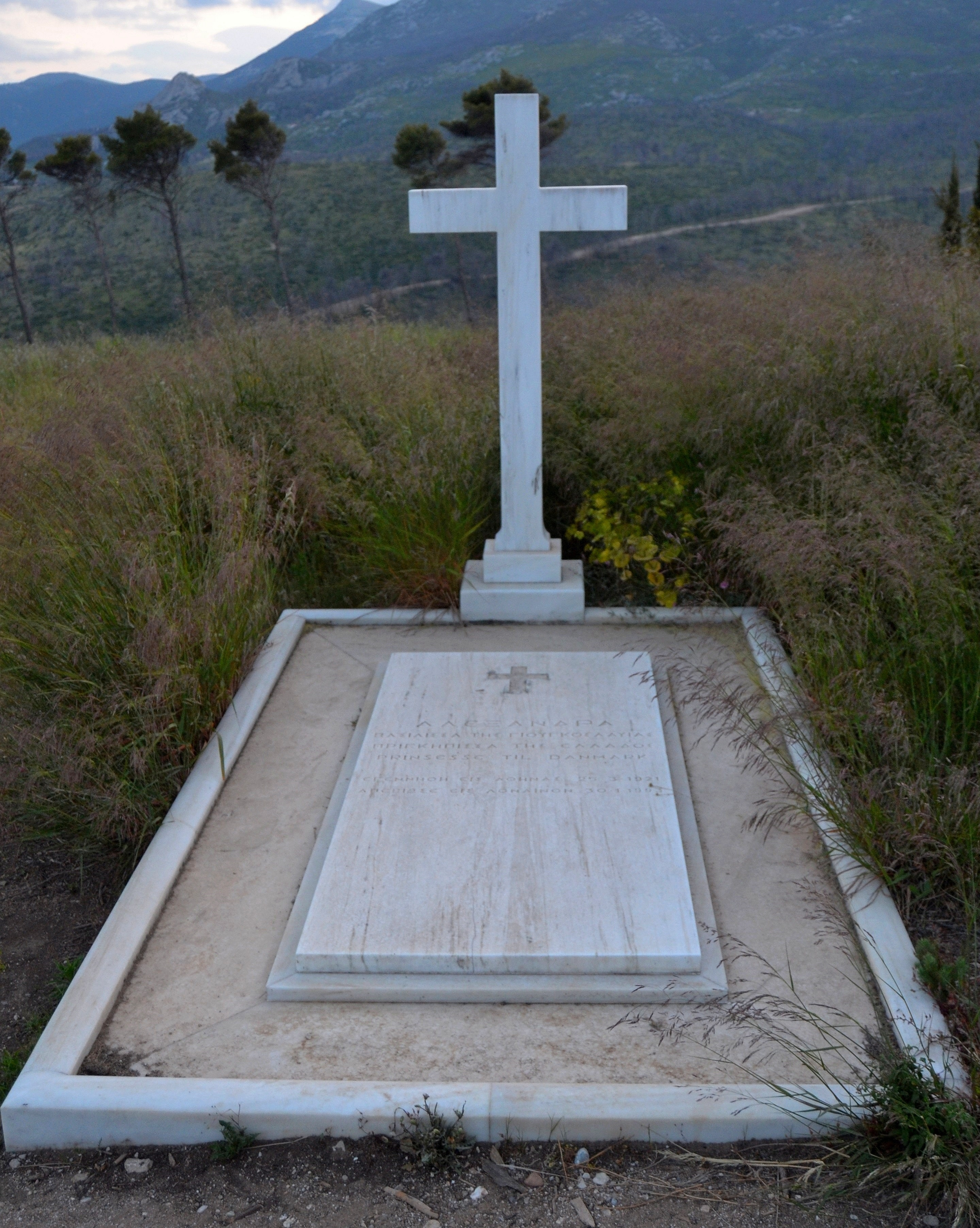
Alexandra of Yugoslavia's former grave at Tatoi, Greece

Peter II died on 3 November 1970 in Denver, United States, during an attempted liver transplant. Lacking resources, his remains were buried in Saint Sava Monastery Church at Libertyville, Illinois, making him the only European monarch so far to have been buried in America. Still unstable and impoverished, Alexandra did not attend the ceremony, which took place in relative privacy.

Two years later, on 1 July 1972, former Crown Prince Alexander of Yugoslavia (now Head of the House of Karađorđević), married at Villamanrique de la Condesa, near Seville, Spain, Princess Maria da Glória of Orléans-Braganza (b. 1946), daughter of Brazilian Imperial pretender Prince Pedro Gastão of Orléans-Braganza and first cousin of King Juan Carlos I of Spain. Too fragile emotionally, Alexandra did not attend the wedding of her son and it was her father's cousin Princess Olga of Greece (wife of Prince-Regent Paul of Yugoslavia), who escorted the groom to the altar.

One month later, on 7 August 1972, Alexandra's mother Princess Aspasia died. Now alone, she finally sold the Garden of Eden in 1979 and returned to the United Kingdom because of her health problems. She died of cancer at Burgess Hill, West Sussex, on 30 January 1993.

The funeral of Alexandra was held in London, in the presence of her son, her three grandsons (Hereditary Prince Peter, Prince Philip and Prince Alexander) and several members of the Greek royal family, including the former King Constantine II and Queen Anne-Marie. Alexandra's remains were then buried in the Royal cemetery park at Tatoi, Greece, next to her mother.

On 26 May 2013, Alexandra's remains were transferred to Serbia for reburial in the crypt of the Royal Mausoleum at Oplenac. With her, the remains of her husband King Peter II, her mother-in-law Queen Mother Maria and brother-in-law Prince Andrew were also reburied at the same time in an official ceremony which was attended by Serbian President Tomislav Nikolić and his government.

== Honours ==
- (Greece) Greek Royal Family: Dame Grand Cross of the Order of Saints Olga and Sophia
- (Kingdom of Yugoslavia) House of Karađorđević: Knight Grand Cross of the Order of the Star of Karađorđe
- (Kingdom of Yugoslavia) House of Karađorđević: Knight Grand Cross of the Order of the White Eagle
- (Kingdom of Yugoslavia) House of Karađorđević: Knight Grand Cross of the Order of St. Sava
- (Kingdom of Yugoslavia) House of Karađorđević: Knight Grand Cross of the Order of the Yugoslav Crown

== Ancestry ==
Ancestors of Alexandra of Yugoslavia

8. George I, King of the Hellenes
4. Constantine I, King of the Hellenes
9. Grand Duchess Olga Constantinovna of Russia
2. Alexander I, King of the Hellenes
10. Frederick III, German Emperor
5. Princess Sophia of Prussia
11. Victoria, Princess Royal
1. Alexandra of Greece and Denmark
12. General Thrasyvoulos Manos
6. Colonel Petros Manos
13. Roxane Mavromichalis
3. Aspasia Manos
14. Iacobos Argyropoulos
7. Maria Argyropoulos
15. Aspasia Petrakis

== Sources ==
- Van der Kiste, John (1994). Kings of the Hellenes: The Greek Kings, 1863-1974. Sutton Publishing. ISBN 9780750921473. OCLC 41157782.
- Mateos Sainz de Medrano, Ricardo (2004). La Familia de la Reina Sofía: La Dinastía griega, la Casa de Hannover y los reales primos de Europa (in Spanish). Madrid: La Esfera de los Libros. ISBN 978-84-9734-195-0. OCLC 55595158.
- Palmer, Alan; Greece, Michael of (1990). The Royal House of Greece. London: Weidenfeld Nicolson Illustrated. ISBN 978-0-297-83060-3. OCLC 59773890.
- Gelardi, Julia P. (2006). Born to rule : granddaughters of Victoria, queens of Europe : Maud of Norway, Sophie of Greece, Alexandra of Russia, Marie of Romania, Victoria Eugenie of Spain. London: Review. ISBN 0-7553-1392-5.
- Eilers, Marlene A. (1987). Queen Victoria's descendants. Baltimore : Genealogical Pub. Co. ISBN 978-0-8063-1202-6.
- Vickers, Hugo (2000). Alice : Princess Andrew of Greece (1st ed.). Hamish Hamilton. ISBN 978-0241136867.
- Foran de Saint-Bar, Thomas (1999). Les Karageorges rois de Serbie et de Yougoslavie : de l'assassinat de la monarchie et de la démocratie en Yougoslavie par Tito, avec l'aide de Staline, jusqu'à la guerre du Kosovo. Paris: Christian. ISBN 2-86496-077-X.

Alexandra of Yugoslavia House of Schleswig-Holstein-Sonderburg-Glücksburg Cadet branch of the House of Oldenburg Born: 25 March 1921 Died: 30 January 1993
Yugoslavian royalty
Vacant Title last held by Maria of Romania	Queen consort of Yugoslavia; 20 March 1944 – 29 November 1945	Monarchy abolished
Titles in pretence
Loss of title Communist Republic declared	— TITULAR — Queen consort of Yugoslavia; 29 November 1945 – 3 November 1970	Vacant Title next held by Princess Maria da Gloria of Orléans-Braganza
