= Christos Zalokostas =

Greek sportsman

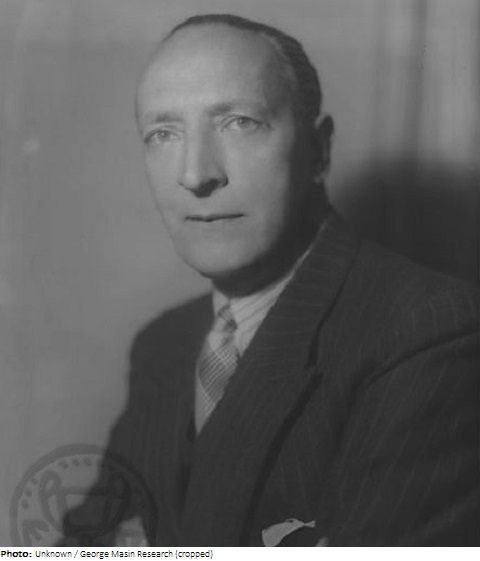

Personal information
- Born: 1894
- Died: 1975 (aged 80–81)

Sport
- Sport: Fencing, Shooting

Christos Zalokostas (Greek: Χρήστος Ζαλοκώστας, 1894–1975) was a Greek industrialist, fencer and sport shooter. He competed at the 1936 Summer Olympics.

== Biography ==
Zalokostas was an Aromanian. He also engaged in writing. Christos married Roxane Manos, daughter of Colonel Petros Manos, sister of Princess Aspasia of Greece and Denmark and aunt of Queen Alexandra of Yugoslavia.
