= Argyropoulos family =

Coat of arms of the Argyropoulos family

The Argyropoulos family (Greek: Αργυρόπουλος, Romanian: Arghiropol) is an old Phanariote family meaning the "son of Argyros". Members of the family held significant positions within the Ottoman Empire, Kingdom of Greece, Russian Empire and the Danubian Principalities.

== Notable members ==
- Emmanouil Argyropoulos (1889–1913), Greek aviator
- Iakovos Argyropoulos (1766–1850), Dragoman of the Porte
- Argiropulos Efendi (d. 1850), Ottoman Greek diplomat
- Periklis Argyropoulos (1871–1953), Greek admiral and diplomat
- Aspasia Manos (1896–1972), Consort of King Alexander of Greece
