= Aspasia Manos =

Morganatic spouse of King Alexander of Greece (1896–1972)

- Princess Aspasia of Greece and Denmark
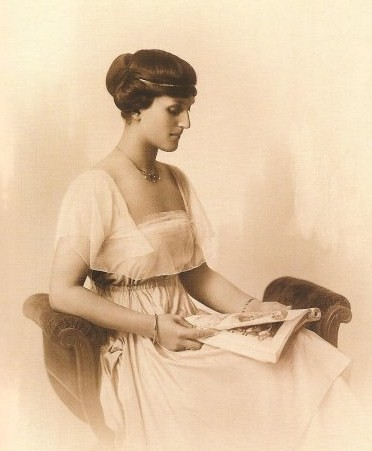
- Manos in 1919

Consort of the Greek monarch
- Tenure: 17 November 1919 – 25 October 1920
- Born: 4 September 1896; Tatoi Palace, Athens, Greece
- Died: 7 August 1972 (aged 75); Ospedale Al Mare, Lido di Venezia, Italy
- Burial: August 1972; Venice, Italy; January 1993; Royal Cemetery, Tatoi Palace, Greece
- Spouse: Alexander of Greece (m. 1919; died 1920)
- Issue: Alexandra, Queen of Yugoslavia
- Father: Petros Manos
- Mother: Maria Argyropoulos
- Religion: Greek Orthodox

Aspasia Manou (Greek: Ασπασία Μάνου; 4 September 1896 – 7 August 1972) was a Greek aristocrat who became the wife of Alexander I, King of Greece. Due to the controversy over her marriage, she was styled Madame Manou instead of "Queen Aspasia", until recognized as Princess Aspasia of Greece and Denmark after Alexander's death and the restoration of King Constantine I, on 10 September 1922. Through her marriage, she and her descendants were some of the only ethnically Greek members of the Greek royal family, which originated in Denmark.

== Family Background ==
Daughter of Colonel Petros Manos, aide-de-camp to King Constantine I of Greece, and Maria Argyropoulos (Petros Manos and Maria Argyropoulos were both descendants of most prominent Greek Phanariote families of Constantinople and descendants of ruling Princes of Transylvania, Wallachia, Moldavia and the Byzantine Empire). Aspasia grew up close to the royal family. After the divorce of her parents, she was sent to study in France and Switzerland. She returned to Greece in 1915 and met Prince Alexander, to whom she became secretly engaged due to the expected refusal of the royal family to recognize the relationship of Alexander I with a woman who did not belong to one of the European ruling dynasties.

== Adult life ==
Meanwhile, the domestic situation in Greece was complicated by World War I. King Constantine I abdicated in 1917 and Alexander was chosen as sovereign. Separated from his family and subjected to the Prime Minister Eleftherios Venizelos, the new ruler found comfort in Aspasia. Despite the opposition of his parents (exiled in Switzerland) and Venizelists (who wanted the king to marry a British princess), King Alexander I secretly married Aspasia on 17 November 1919. The public revelation of the wedding shortly after caused a huge scandal, and Aspasia temporarily left Greece. However, she was reunited with her husband after a few months of separation and was then allowed to return to Greece without receiving the title of Queen of the Hellenes. She became pregnant, but Alexander died on 25 October 1920, less than a year after their marriage.

At the same time, the situation in Greece was deteriorating again: the country was in the middle of a bloody conflict with the Ottoman Empire, Constantine I was restored (19 December 1920) only to be deposed again (27 September 1922), this time in favor of Diadochos (Crown Prince) George. Initially excluded from the royal family, Aspasia was gradually integrated after the birth of her daughter Alexandra on 25 March 1921 and was later recognized with the title of Princess Alexander of Greece and Denmark after a decree issued by her father-in-law. Nevertheless, her situation remained precarious due to the dislike of her sister-in-law Elisabeth of Romania and the political instability of the country. Although they were the only members of the royal family to be allowed to stay in Greece after the proclamation of the Republic on 25 March 1924, Aspasia and her daughter chose to settle in Florence, with Queen Sophia. They remained there until 1927 then divided their time between the United Kingdom and Venice.

== After the Restoration of the Monarchy ==
The restoration of the Greek monarchy in 1935 did not change Aspasia's life. Sheltered by her in-laws, she made the Venetian villa Garden of Eden her main residence, until the outbreak of the Greco-Italian War in 1940. After a brief return to her country, where she worked for the Red Cross, the princess spent World War II in England. In 1944, her daughter married the exiled King Peter II of Yugoslavia, and Aspasia became a grandmother with the birth of Alexander, Crown Prince of Yugoslavia in 1945. Once peace was restored, Aspasia returned to live in Venice. Her last days were marked by economic hardship, illness and especially worry for her daughter, who made several suicide attempts. Aspasia died in 1972, but it was not until 1993 that her remains were transferred to the royal necropolis of Tatoi.

== Family ==
Coat of arms of the Manos family, Romanian noble family of Phanariote Greek origin

Aspasia was born in Tatoi, Athens on 4 September 1896 as the eldest daughter of Petros Manos, a Colonel in the Hellenic Army, by his first wife, Maria Argyropoulos (1874–1930). Petros Manos and Maria Argyropoulos were second cousins, both being descendants of the most prominent Greek Phanariote families of Constantinople and the descendants of the ruling Princes of Transylvania, Wallachia and Moldavia (commonly known as Danubian Principalities). Named after her maternal grandmother, Aspasia Anargyrou Petrakis, daughter of Anargyros Petrakis (1793–1876), the first modern Mayor of Athens, she had one younger full-sister, Roxane (born 28 February 1898), wife of Christos Zalokostas, former Olympian athlete, writer and later an industrialist. From her father's second marriage to Sophie Tombazis-Mavrocordato (b. 1875) (daughter of Alexandros Tombazis and his wife, Princess Maria Mavrocordato), she had one half-sister, Rallou (1915–1988), a modern dancer, choreographer and a dance teacher, who was married to a prominent Greek architect Pavlos Mylonas.

== Early years ==
After the divorce of her parents, Aspasia left Athens to complete her studies in France and Switzerland. Having returned to Greece in 1915, she came to live with her mother. Shortly after, she met her childhood friend, Prince Alexander of Greece, at a party given by the Palace Stable master, Theodoros Ypsilantis. Described by many of her contemporaries as a very beautiful woman, (Note: British writer Compton Mackenzie describes Aspasia as follows: "She was tall and her skin remembered the beauty of classical Greece". As for Prince Christopher of Greece, he considers that "her beauty was wonderful". According to him, "she looks like one of these nymphs of the frescos of ancient Greece that would come back to life".) Aspasia immediately caught the attention of the prince who then had no other wish than to conquer her.

=== Secret engagement ===
Initially, Aspasia was very reluctant to accept the romantic advances of the prince. Renowned for his many female conquests, Alexander seemed to her untrustworthy, also because their social differences impeded any serious relationship. (Note: The Manos and Argyropoulos families belonged to the high Phanariote aristocracy; however, their rank was deemed insufficient to be able to marry into one of the European ruling families.) However, the perseverance of the Greek prince, who travelled to Spetses in the summer of 1915 for the sole purpose of seeing Aspasia, finally overcame her misgivings.

Deeply in love with each other, they became engaged but their marital project remained secret. Alexander's parents, especially Queen Sophia (born a Prussian princess of the House of Hohenzollern), were very attached to social conventions, making it unthinkable that their children could marry persons not belonging to European royalty.

== World War I and its consequences ==
=== Accession to the throne of Alexander I ===
During World War I, King Constantine I (who ascended to the throne in 1913 following the assassination of his father, King George I) kept Greece in a policy of neutrality towards the German Empire and the other powers of the Triple Alliance. Brother-in-law of Emperor William II, the Greek sovereign was accused by the Allies of being pro-German because he spent part of his military training in Prussia. This situation led to a rupture between the sovereign and his Prime Minister, Eleftherios Venizelos, who was convinced of the need to support the countries of the Triple Entente to link the Greek minorities of the Ottoman Empire and the Balkans to the Hellenic Kingdom. In the end, King Constantine was deposed in 1917 and replaced by his second son Prince Alexander, considered more malleable than his elder brother Diadochos George by the Triple Entente.

On the day of his accession to the throne, 10 June 1917, Alexander I revealed to his father his relationship with Aspasia and asked him for permission to marry her. Very reluctant to approve what he considered a mésalliance, Constantine asked his son to wait until the end of the war to marry. In return, the deposed King promised to be his son's witness at his wedding day. In these circumstances, Alexander agreed to postpone his projected marriage until the restoration of peace. Two days later, Constantine and his relatives arrived at the small port of Oropos and went into exile; it was the last time that Alexander was in contact with his family.

=== A bond considered unequal ===
Once his family went into exile, Alexander I found himself completely isolated by Eleftherios Venizelos and his supporters. The entire staff of the crown was gradually replaced by the enemies of Constantine I, and his son was forced to dismiss his friends when they were not simply arrested. Even the portraits of the dynasty were removed from the palaces, and sometimes the new ministers called him, in his presence, "son of the traitor".

Prisoner in his own kingdom, the young monarch took very badly the separation from his family. He regularly wrote letters to his parents, but they were intercepted by the government and his family didn't receive them. Under these conditions, the only comfort of Alexander was Aspasia and he decided to marry her despite the recommendations of his father and the opposition of the Prime Minister. Indeed, Eleftherios Venizelos, despite being previously a friend of Petros Manos (Aspasia's father), feared that she used her family connections to mediate between Alexander I and his parents. Above all, the Prime Minister would have preferred that the monarch should marry Princess Mary of the United Kingdom to strengthen the ties between Greece and the Triple Entente. (Note: However, according to Prince Peter of Greece "he believed that Eleftherios Venizelos [...] would have encouraged the marriage [of Alexander I and Aspasia] with the purpose of obtaining political advantages for him and his party and in order to bring discredit to the royal family". In: Prince Peter of Greece and Denmark, Comments by HRH Prince Peter of Greece and Denmark, in Patricia H. Fleming, The Politics of Marriage Among Non-Catholic European Royalty in Current Anthropology, vol. 14, n° 3, Chicago, The University of Chicago Press, June 1973, p. 246.)

However, the relationship of Alexander I and Aspasia did not only have enemies. The Greek royal dynasty was indeed of German origin and to find Byzantine ancestors to them they had to go back to the Middle Ages. (Note: George I of Greece, grandfather of Alexander I, was a matrilineal descendant of Byzantine Emperor Theodore I Laskaris through his daughter Maria Laskarina and his patrilineal ancestor Frederick I of Denmark.) In these circumstances, the union of the monarch and his fiancée would effectively Hellenize the dynasty, which would not displease all the Greeks. Finally, in the same foreign powers, particularly the British Embassy, the assumption of this marriage was seen favorably. Indeed, the influence of Aspasia on the sovereign was found to be positive, because she gave to him the strength to remain in the throne. The official visit of Alexander's great-uncle Prince Arthur, Duke of Connaught and Strathearn, to Athens in March 1918 also confirmed the support of the United Kingdom to the marriage project. The son of Queen Victoria in fact requested to meet Aspasia and then told Alexander I that if he had been younger, he too would have sought to marry her.

== Scandalous marriage ==
=== Secret wedding ===
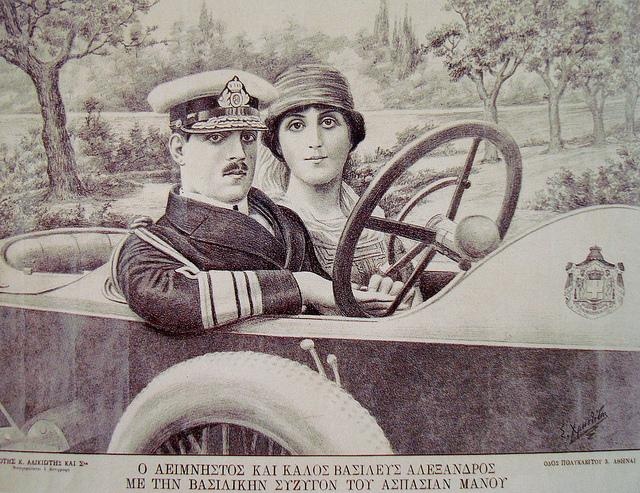
Lithograph of King Alexander I of Greece and Aspasia Manos, ca. 1918

Faced with the complete opposition of both the government and royal family, Alexander I and Aspasia decided to marry secretly. With the help of Aspasia's brother-in-law, Christos Zalokostas, and after three attempts, the couple managed to be wedded by the Archimandrite Zacharistas in the evening of 17 November 1919. After the ceremony (which also included a civil wedding), the archimandrite swore to keep silent about it, but he quickly broke his promise and confessed the whole affair to the Metropolitan Meletius III of Athens. Through her marriage, she and her descendants would become the only ethnically Greek members of the Greek royal family, which originated in Denmark.

According to the Greek constitution, members of the royal family are not only obliged to obtain the permission of the sovereign to marry but also of the head of the Church of Greece. By marrying Aspasia without the consent of the Metropolitan, Alexander I had not complied with the law, causing a huge scandal in the country. Although the marriage of the young couple was retroactively recognized as legal (but non-dynastic) following Alexander's death, Aspasia was never entitled to be known as "Queen of the Hellenes"; she was instead styled "Madame Manos".

=== Unequal marriage ===
Despite his anger at the wedding, Eleftherios Venizelos permitted, initially, that Aspasia and her mother move to the Royal Palace with the condition that the marriage not be made public. However, the secret was soon discovered and Aspasia was forced to leave Greece to escape the scandal. Exiled, she settled first in Rome and then in Paris.

Alexander I was allowed to join her in the French capital six months later. Officially, the monarch made a state visit to the Allies' heads of state gathered at the Peace Conference. In reality, the stay was something of a honeymoon for the couple.

Finally, Aspasia and her husband received permission from the government to get back together in Greece during summer 1920. In the Hellenic capital, "Madame Manos" was firstly in her sister's house before moving to Tatoi Palace. It was during this period that she became pregnant, an event that caused great joy to the couple.

== Death of Alexander I ==
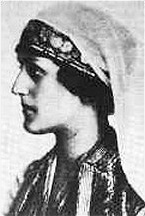
Aspasia Manos in Greek costume, ca. 1920

On 2 October 1920, King Alexander I had an accident when he took a walk on the lands of the domain of Tatoi. A macaque who belonged to the manager of the vineyards of the palace attacked Fritz, the German Shepherd dog of the sovereign, and he attempted to separate the two animals. As he did so, another monkey attacked Alexander and bit him deeply on the leg and torso. Eventually, servants arrived and chased away the monkeys (which were later destroyed), and the King's wounds were promptly cleaned and dressed but not cauterized. He didn't consider the incident serious and asked that it not be publicized.

Beginning on the night of the event, Alexander I developed a high fever: his wound had become infected and soon developed into septicaemia. With the rapid evolution of his illness, doctors planned to amputate his leg but no one wanted to take responsibility for such an act. Operated on seven times, he was cared for only by Aspasia during the four weeks of his illness. Under the effect of the blood poisoning, the young King suffered terribly and his cries of pain were heard in the entire Royal Palace. On 19 October, he became delirious and called out for his mother. However, the Greek government refused to allow Queen Sophia to re-enter the country. In St. Moritz, where she was exiled with the rest of the royal family, the Queen begged the Hellenic authorities to let her take care of her son but Venizelos remained adamant. Finally, Dowager Queen Olga, widow of George I, was allowed to travel alone to Athens to be with her grandson. Delayed by rough seas, however, she arrived twelve hours after the King's death, on 25 October 1920. Informed by telegram that night, other members of the royal family learned of the death with sadness.

Two days after the death of the monarch, his funeral service was held in the Metropolitan Cathedral of Athens. Once again, the royal family was refused permission to enter Greece; in consequence, apart from Aspasia, only Dowager Queen Olga was present at the funeral. The body of Alexander I was buried in the royal burial ground at Tatoi Palace.

== Birth of Alexandra and its consequences ==
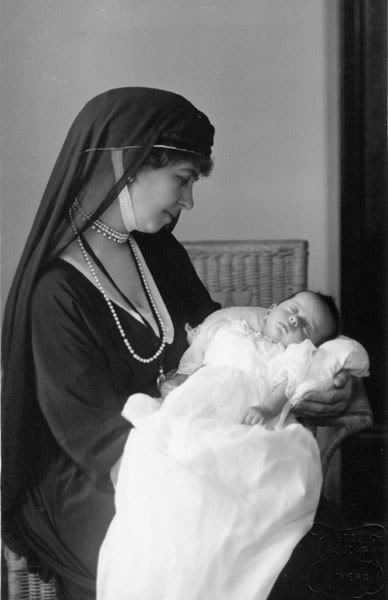
Queen Sophia of Greece with her newborn granddaughter Alexandra, April 1921.

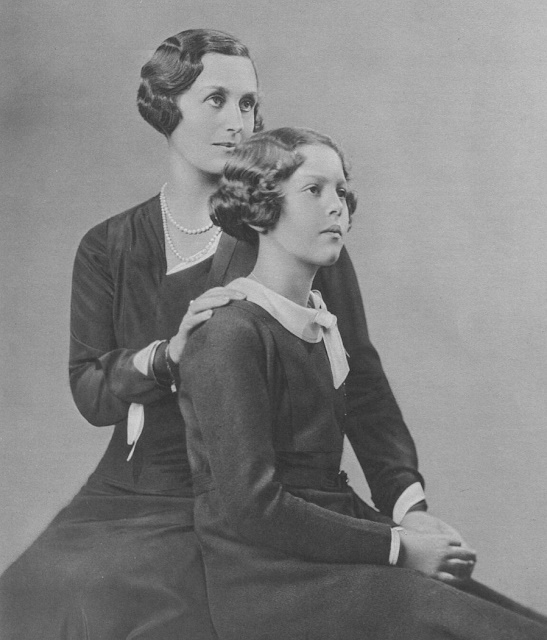
Photo of Aspasia with her daughter Alexandra

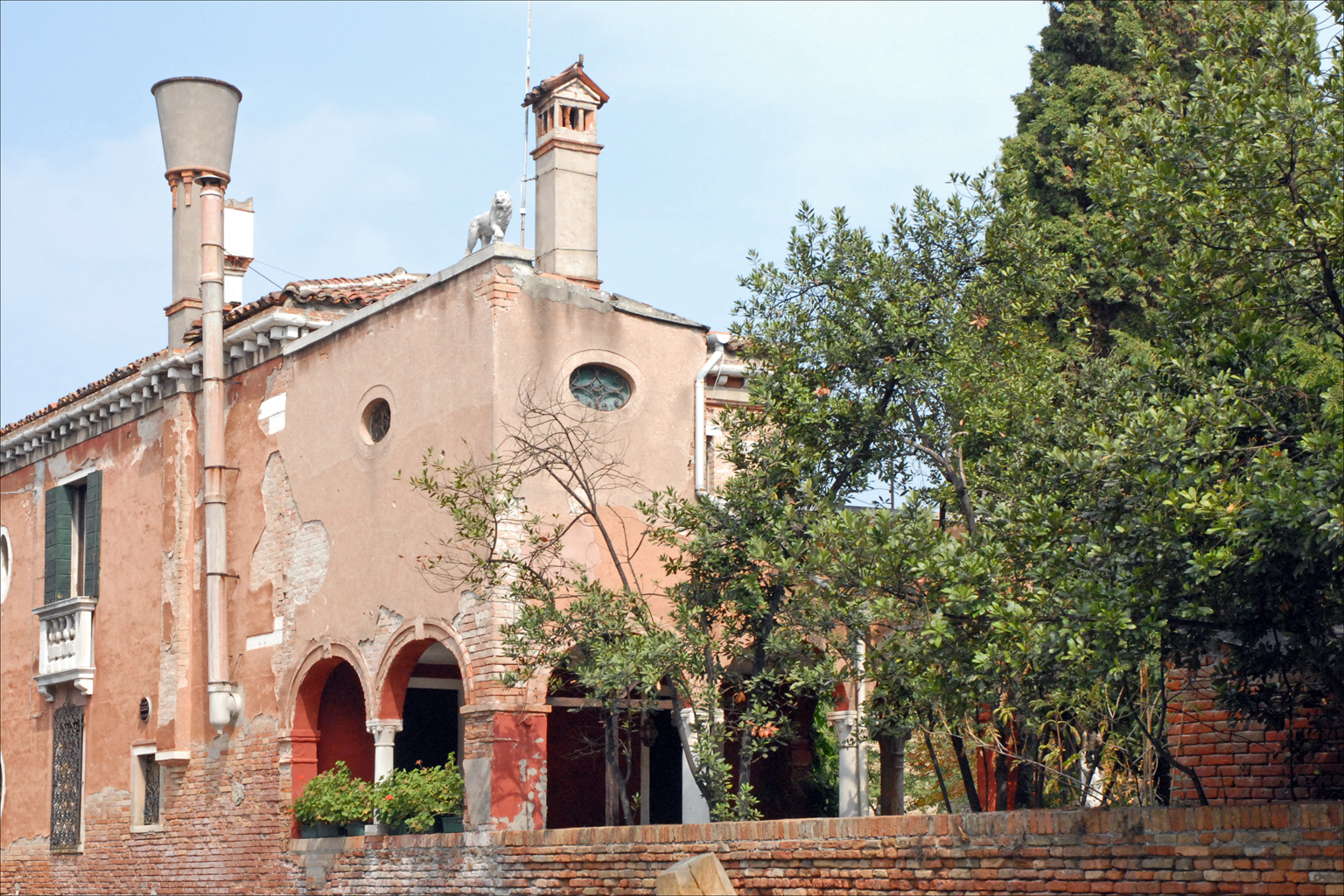
Aspasia's new home: The Garden of Eden villa, Venice, Italy

=== Kingdom without a King ===
Four months pregnant at the time of her husband's death, Aspasia withdrew to the Diadochos Palace at Athens. In Greece, the unexpected death of Alexander I had much more serious consequences: it raised the question of succession and even the survival of the monarchy. Because the King had married without his father's or the head of Orthodox Church's permission, it was technically illegal, the marriage void, and the couple's posthumous child illegitimate according to law. Maintaining the monarchy therefore involved finding another sovereign and, as the Venizelists still opposed Constantine I and Diadochos George, the government decided to offer the crown to another member of the royal family, the young Prince Paul. However, he refused to ascend the throne, which remained resolutely vacant.

With Aspasia's pregnancy approaching its end, some plotted to put her child on the throne and rumours even assured that she was a supporter of this solution. The victory of the monarchists in the elections of 1 November 1920 changed everything. Dimitrios Rallis replaced Eleftherios Venizelos as Prime Minister and Constantine I was soon restored.

=== Gradual integration into the royal family ===
The restoration of Constantine I at first did not bring any change to Aspasia's situation. Considered intriguing by part of the royal family, especially by her sister-in-law Princess Elisabeth of Romania who hated her, she was under the suspicion that she wanted to put her unborn child on the throne. The royal family feared the birth of a male child, which could further complicate the political situation at a time when Greece was already at war against the Ottoman Empire. However, not all members of the royal family shared this distrust: Princess Alice of Battenberg, aunt of the deceased Alexander I, chose to spend Christmas of 1920 in the company of Aspasia. For her part, Queen Sophia, who previously strongly opposed her son's relationship with Aspasia, approached her daughter-in-law and awaited the birth of her first grandchild.

The birth of Alexandra on 25 March 1921 caused a great relief to the royal family: under the terms of the Salic law (which prevailed in Greece), the newborn could not claim the crown and she was unlikely to be used to undermine the dynasty. King Constantine I and Dowager Queen Olga therefore accepted easily that they become the godparents of the child. Still, neither the child nor her mother received more official recognition; only in July 1922, and at the behest of Queen Sophia, a law was passed which allowed the King to retroactively recognize marriages of members of the royal family, although on a non-dynastic basis. With this legal subterfuge, Alexandra obtained the style of Royal Highness and the title of Princess of Greece and Denmark. Aspasia's status, however, was not changed with the law and she remained a simple commoner to the eyes of protocol.

Humiliated by this difference in treatment, Aspasia approached Prince Christopher of Greece (who also married a commoner), and begged him to intercede on her behalf. Moved by the arguments of his niece-in-law, the Prince talked to Queen Sophia, who eventually changed her opinion. Under pressure from his wife, King Constantine I issued a decree, gazetted 10 September 1922 under which Aspasia received the title "Princess of Greece and Denmark" and the style of Royal Highness.

== Fall of the monarchy and wandering life ==
=== From Athens to Florence ===
Despite these positive developments, the situation of Aspasia and her daughter did not improve. Indeed, Greece experienced a serious military defeat against Turkey and a coup d'état soon forced Constantine I to abdicate in favor of Diadochos George, on 27 September 1922. Things went from bad to worse for the country, and a failed monarchist coup d'état forced the new King George II and his family into exile in December 1923. Four months later, on 25 March 1924, the Second Hellenic Republic was proclaimed and both Aspasia and Alexandra were then the only members of the dynasty allowed to stay in Greece.

Penniless, Aspasia, with her daughter, chose to follow her in-laws to the exile in early 1924. They found refuge with Queen Sophia, who moved to the Villa Bobolina in Fiesole near Florence shortly after the death of her husband in December 1923. The now Dowager Queen, who adored Alexandra, was delighted, even if her financial situation was also precarious.

=== From London to Venice ===
In 1927, Aspasia and her daughter moved to Ascot, Berkshire, in the United Kingdom. They were greeted by Sir James Horlick, 4th Baronet and his Horlick family, who harbored them in their ancestral seat Cowley Manor. With her personal savings and the financial support of Horlick, Aspasia bought a small property on the Island of Giudecca in Venice. Former home of Caroline (sister of the garden designer Gertrude Jekyll) and Frederic Eden (a great-uncle of the British Prime Minister Anthony Eden), the villa and its 3.6 hectares of landscaped grounds were named the Garden of Eden, to the delight of Greek princesses.

== Possible second marriage ==
Widow for many years, in 1933 Aspasia had a romantic relationship with the Sicilian Prince Starrabba di Giardinelli, who asked her to marry him. She was about to accept the proposal, when he suddenly fell ill and died of typhoid fever.

== Estrangement from the Greek royal family ==
=== Restoration of the monarchy and outbreak of World War II ===
In 1935, the Second Hellenic Republic was abolished and George II was restored to the throne after a referendum organized by General Georgios Kondylis. While several members of the royal family decided to return to Greece, Aspasia chose to remain in Italy, but claimed, in the name of her daughter, her rightful share of the inheritance of Alexander I. Unlike Princess Alexandra, Aspasia was subsequently not invited to the ceremonies which marked the return of the remains of King Constantine I, Queen Sophia and Dowager Queen Olga to the Kingdom (1936), or the wedding of her brother-in-law, the Diadochos Paul, with Princess Frederica of Hanover (1938). Even worse, Aspasia did not have a plot in the royal cemetery of Tatoi, because the grave of her husband was placed next to that of his parents in order to keep him away from his wife even in death.

The outbreak of the Greco-Italian War on 28 October 1940 forced Aspasia and Alexandra to suddenly leave fascist Italy. They settled with the rest of the royal family in Athens. Eager to serve her country in this difficult moment, Aspasia helped with the Red Cross. However, after several months of victorious battles against the Italian forces, Greece was invaded by the army of Nazi Germany and the majority of the members of the royal family left the country on 22 April 1941. After a brief stay in Crete, where they survived a German bombing raid, Aspasia and her family departed for Egypt and South Africa.

=== Settling in England and Alexandra's marriage ===
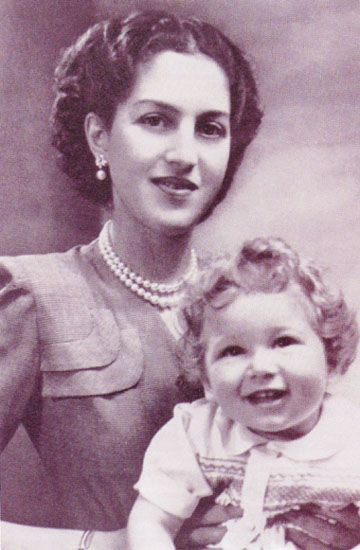
Queen Alexandra of Yugoslavia with her son, Crown Prince Alexander, ca. 1946

While several members of the royal family were forced to spend World War II in South Africa, Aspasia obtained the permission of King George II of Greece and the British government to move to the United Kingdom with her daughter. Arriving at Liverpool in the fall of 1941, they settled in Mayfair, London. In the English capital, the Greek princesses resumed their activities with the Red Cross. Better accepted than in their own country, they were regularly received by their cousin Marina, Duchess of Kent (born Princess of Greece and Denmark) and, while he was on leave from the Royal Navy, met the future Duke of Edinburgh (born Prince Philip of Greece), who for some time was looked on as a suitable husband for Alexandra.

However, Alexandra soon met and was attracted to another royal figure. In 1942, the Greek princess met King Peter II of Yugoslavia at an officers gala at Grosvenor House. The 19-year-old sovereign had lived in exile in London since the invasion of his country by the Axis powers in April 1941. They quickly fell in love with each other and eventually were married on 20 March 1944, despite the opposition of the Queen Mother Maria of Yugoslavia (born Princess Maria of Romania). The ceremony was very modest, because of financial difficulties related to the war, but Aspasia, who always wanted to see her daughter marry well, was delighted. (Note: Despite her desire to unite Alexandra to an important member of the European royalty, Aspasia declined the marriage proposal that King Zog I of Albania addressed to her daughter when she was 15-years-old.)

Shortly after the end of the war, on 17 July 1945, Queen Alexandra gave birth to her only child, Crown Prince Alexander of Yugoslavia, in Suite 212 of Claridge's Hotel in Brook Street, London, which according to some reports was transformed for the occasion into Yugoslav territory by the British Prime Minister, Winston Churchill. However, the arrival of the heir to the throne was quickly followed by the deposition of the Karađorđević dynasty and the proclamation of the Socialist Federal Republic of Yugoslavia by Marshal Tito on 29 November 1945. This was the beginning of a long period of difficulties, marked by financial instability, the pursuit of vain political projects and the deterioration of relations between Alexandra and Peter II.

== Later life ==
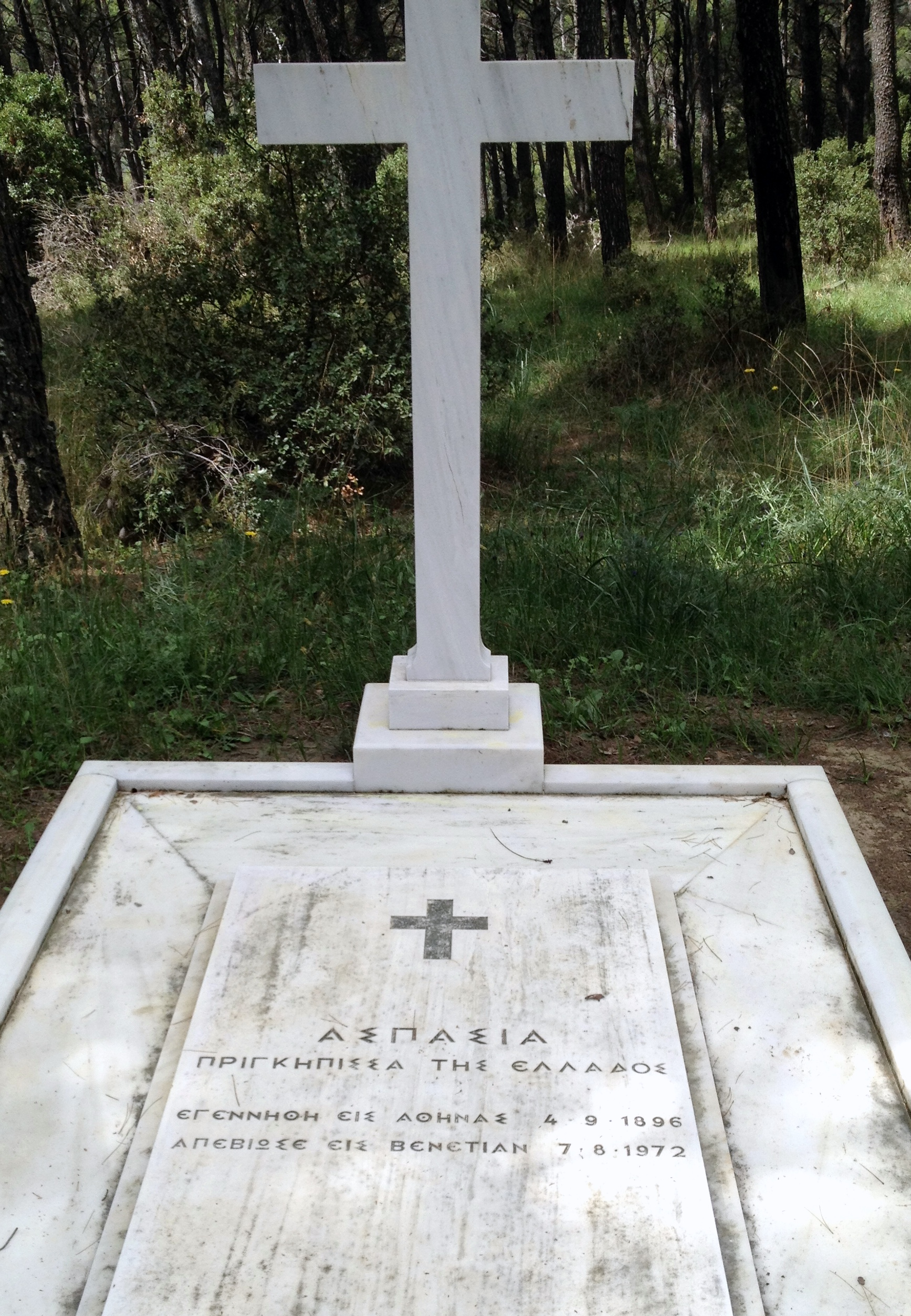
Aspasia Manos' tomb at Tatoi, Greece (2013)

=== Return to Venice and financial difficulties ===
After the end of World War II, Aspasia decided not to go back to Greece and she returned to Venice, to live once more on the Island of Giudecca. Back in the Garden of Eden, she found her house partially destroyed by the conflict and began to rebuild. Still without sufficient financial resources and concerned about the situation of her daughter (who granted her at one point the guardianship of her grandson Crown Prince Alexander,), Aspasia led a quiet life, punctuated by a few public appearances during cultural events. Over the years, her financial situation deteriorated even further, and during the winter of 1959–1960, the Princess was no longer able to pay the heating bills. She temporarily left the Garden of Eden and stayed in the hotels Europa and Britannia in Venice. (Note: According to Prince Michael of Greece, maintaining a mansion cost much more than renting a suite in a grand hotel, a few decades ago. Referring to the decision of his parents to move for one year in the hotel Excelsior in Rome, the prince wrote that it "seemed possible at the height of the economy of that, while today it would be exactly the opposite...".) Shortly after, she was forced to sell some furniture and other valuables to pay off her debts.

=== Alexandra's depression and health problems ===
Demoralised by exile and financial difficulties, the former King Peter II of Yugoslavia gradually became an alcoholic and relieved his boredom by multiplying his affairs with other women. Worn down by the behavior of her husband, with whom she was still in love, Alexandra developed behaviours increasingly dangerous to her health. Probably prone to anorexia, in 1950 the former queen undertook a first suicide attempt, while staying with her mother. After several years of wandering between Italy, the United States and France, Alexandra finally moved permanently to the Garden of Eden after the death of Peter II in 1970.

=== Aspasia's health and death ===
Heartbroken by the fate of her daughter, Aspasia saw her own health gradually deteriorate over the years. Seriously ill, she could not attend the wedding of her grandson to Princess Maria da Gloria of Orléans-Braganza (b. 1946) on 1 July 1972. One month later, on 7 August 1972, Princess Aspasia died in the Ospedale al Mare in Venice. At the time, Greece was ruled by the Regime of the Colonels and so Alexandra chose to bury her mother in the Orthodox section of the cemetery of San Michele island near Venice. Only after the death of Alexandra, in January 1993, were the remains of Aspasia and her daughter transferred to the Royal Cemetery Plot in the park of Tatoi near Dekeleia, at the request of Crown Prince Alexander of Yugoslavia.

== Bibliography ==
- Gelardi, Julia (2006), Born to Rule : Granddaughters of Victoria, Queens of Europe, Headline Review ISBN 0-7553-1392-5
- Llewellyn Smith, Michael (1998), Ionian Vision : Greece in Asia Minor 1919–1922, London, Hurst & Co ISBN 1-85065-413-1
- Mateos Sainz de Medrano, Ricardo (2004), La Familia de la Reina Sofía, La Dinastía griega, la Casa de Hannover y los reales primos de Europa, Madrid, La Esfera de los Libros ISBN 84-9734-195-3
- Palmer, Alan and of Greece, Michael (1990), The Royal House of Greece, Weidenfeld Nicolson Illustrated ISBN 0-297-83060-0
- Van der Kiste, John (1994), Kings of the Hellenes: The Greek Kings, 1863–1974, Sutton Publishing ISBN 0-7509-2147-1
- Vickers, Hugo (2000), Alice, Princess Andrew of Greece, London, Hamish Hamilton ISBN 0-241-13686-5

Preceded by Sophia of Prussia	Consort of the King of the Hellenes; 17 November 1919 – 25 October 1920	Succeeded by Sophia of Prussia
