= Alexander of Greece =

King of Greece from 1917 to 1920

Alexander
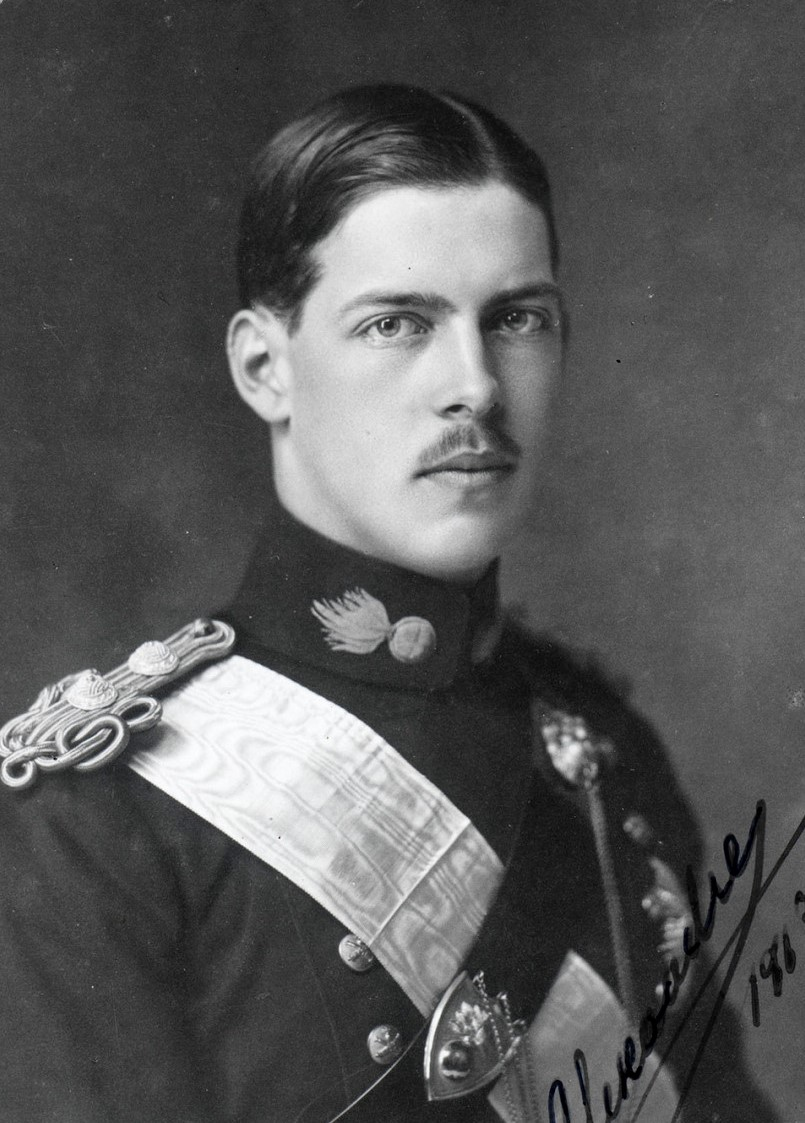
- Formal portrait, c. 1917

King of the Hellenes
- Reign: 11 June 1917 – 25 October 1920 (Note: Dates in this article are in the New Style Gregorian calendar. The Old Style Julian calendar was used in Greece throughout Alexander's lifetime.)
- Inauguration: 11 June 1917
- Predecessor: Constantine I
- Successor: Constantine I (Note: Pavlos Kountouriotis as Regent)
- Born: 1 August 1893; Tatoi Palace, Athens, Kingdom of Greece
- Died: 25 October 1920 (aged 27); Athens, Kingdom of Greece
- Burial: 29 October 1920; Royal Cemetery, Tatoi Palace, Greece
- Spouse: Aspasia Manos (m. 1919)
- Issue: Alexandra, Queen of Yugoslavia
- Greek: Αλέξανδρος (Aléxandros)
- House: Glücksburg
- Father: Constantine I of Greece
- Mother: Sophia of Prussia
- Military career
- Allegiance: Kingdom of Greece
- Branch: Hellenic Army
- Units: Army of Thessaly
- Conflicts: Balkan Wars; First Balkan War; Second Balkan War

Alexander (Greek: Αλέξανδρος, romanized: Aléxandros; 1 August 1893 – 25 October 1920) was King of Greece from 11 June 1917 until his death on 25 October 1920.

The second son of King Constantine I, Alexander was born in the summer palace of Tatoi on the outskirts of Athens. He succeeded his father in 1917, during World War I, after the Entente Powers and the followers of Eleftherios Venizelos pushed King Constantine and his eldest son, Crown Prince George, into exile. Having no real political experience, the new king was stripped of his powers by the Venizelists and effectively imprisoned in his own palace. Venizelos, as prime minister, was the effective ruler with the support of the Entente. Though reduced to the status of a puppet king, Alexander supported Greek troops during their war against the Ottoman Empire and Bulgaria. Under his reign, the territorial extent of Greece considerably increased, following the victory of the Entente and their Allies in the First World War and the early stages of the Greco-Turkish War of 1919–1922.

Alexander controversially married the commoner Aspasia Manos in 1919, provoking a major scandal that forced the couple to leave Greece for several months. Soon after returning to Greece with his wife, Alexander was bitten by a domestic Barbary macaque and died aged 27 of sepsis. The sudden death of the sovereign led to questions over the monarchy's survival and contributed to the fall of the Venizelist regime. After a general election and a referendum, Constantine I was restored to the throne.

== Early life ==
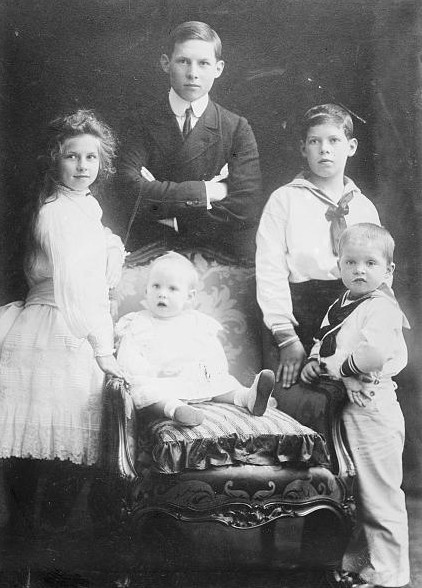
Alexander with four of his siblings in 1905. Clockwise from far left: Helen, George, Alexander, Paul and Irene.

Alexander was born at Tatoi Palace on 1 August 1893 (20 July in the Julian calendar), the second son of Crown Prince Constantine of Greece and Princess Sophia of Prussia. He was related to royalty throughout Europe. His father was the eldest son of King George I of Greece by his wife, Olga Constantinovna of Russia; his mother was the daughter of Frederick III, German Emperor, and Victoria, Princess Royal of the United Kingdom. His parents' cousins included King George V of the United Kingdom and Emperor Nicholas II of Russia. Wilhelm II, German Emperor, was his maternal uncle.

Alexander's early life alternated between the Royal Palace in Athens, and Tatoi Palace in the city's suburbs. With his parents he undertook several trips abroad and regularly visited Schloss Friedrichshof, the home of his maternal grandmother, who had a particular affection for her Greek grandson.

Though he was very close to his younger sister Helen, Alexander was less warm towards his elder brother, George, with whom he had little in common. While George was a serious and thoughtful child, Alexander was mischievous and extroverted; he smoked cigarettes made from blotting paper, set fire to the games room in the palace, and recklessly lost control of a toy cart in which he and his younger brother Paul were rolling down a hill, tipping his toddler brother a distance of 6 ft (1.8 m) into brambles.

== Military career ==
Alexander was third in line to the throne, after his father and elder brother. His education was expensive and carefully planned, but while George spent part of his military training in Germany, Alexander was educated in Greece. He joined the prestigious Hellenic Military Academy, where several of his uncles had previously studied and where he made himself known more for his mechanical skills than for his intellectual capacity. He was passionate about cars and motors, and was one of the first Greeks to acquire an automobile.

Alexander distinguished himself in combat during the Balkan Wars of 1912–13. As a young officer, he was stationed, along with his elder brother, in the field staff of his father; he accompanied the latter at the head of the Army of Thessaly during the capture of Thessaloniki in 1912. King George I was assassinated in Thessaloniki soon afterwards on 18 March 1913, and Alexander's father ascended the throne as Constantine I.

=== Courtship of Aspasia Manos ===
In 1915, at a party held in Athens by court marshal Theodore Ypsilantis, Alexander became re-acquainted with one of his childhood friends, Aspasia Manos. She had just returned from education in France and Switzerland, and was reckoned as very beautiful by her acquaintances.

She was the daughter of Constantine's Master of the Horse, Colonel Petros Manos, and his wife Maria Argyropoulos. The 21-year-old Alexander was smitten, and was so determined to seduce her that he followed her to the island of Spetses where she holidayed that year. Initially, Aspasia was resistant to his charm; although considered very handsome by his contemporaries, Alexander had a reputation as a ladies' man from numerous past liaisons.

Despite this, he finally won her over, and the couple were engaged in secret. However, for King Constantine I, Queen Sophia and much of European society of the time, it was inconceivable for a royal prince to marry someone of a different social rank.

=== World War I ===
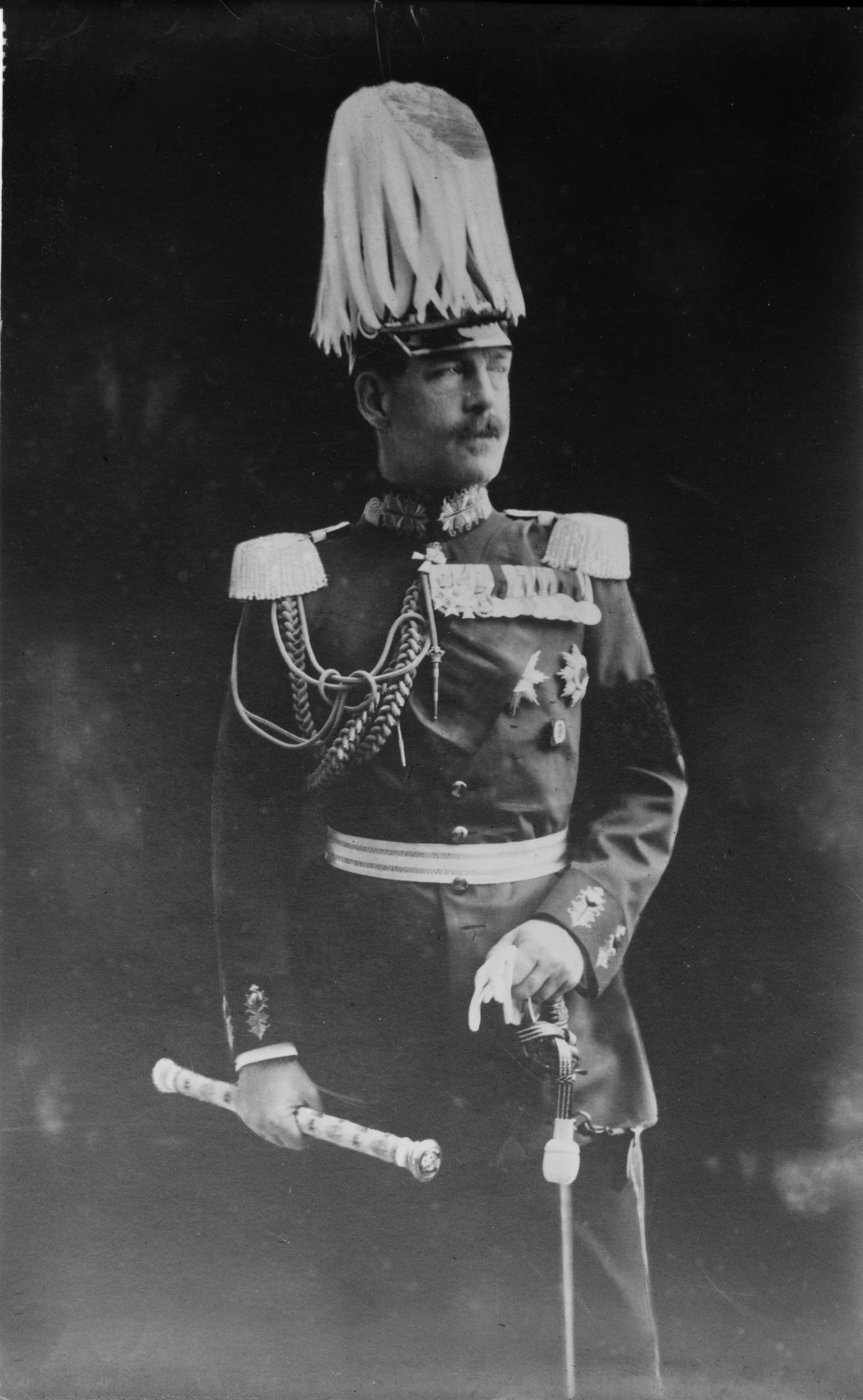
Alexander's father, Constantine I, in the uniform of a German field marshal, c. 1913

During World War I, Constantine I followed a formal policy of neutrality, yet he was openly benevolent towards Germany, which was fighting alongside Austria-Hungary, Bulgaria and the Ottoman Empire against the Triple Entente of Russia, France and Britain. Constantine was the brother-in-law of Kaiser Wilhelm II, and had also become something of a Germanophile following his military training in Prussia. His pro-German attitude provoked a split between the monarch and the prime minister, Eleftherios Venizelos, who wanted to support the Entente in the hope of expanding Greek territory to incorporate the Greek minorities in the Ottoman Empire and the Balkans. Protected by the countries of the Entente, particularly France, in 1916 Venizelos formed a parallel government to that of the king.

Parts of Greece were occupied by the Allied Entente forces, but Constantine I refused to modify his policy and faced increasingly open opposition from the Entente and the Venizelists. In July 1916, an arson attack ravaged Tatoi Palace and the royal family barely escaped the flames; Alexander was not injured but his mother narrowly saved Princess Katherine by carrying her through the woods for more than 2 km (1.2 mi). Among the palace personnel and firefighters who arrived to deal with the blaze, sixteen people were killed.

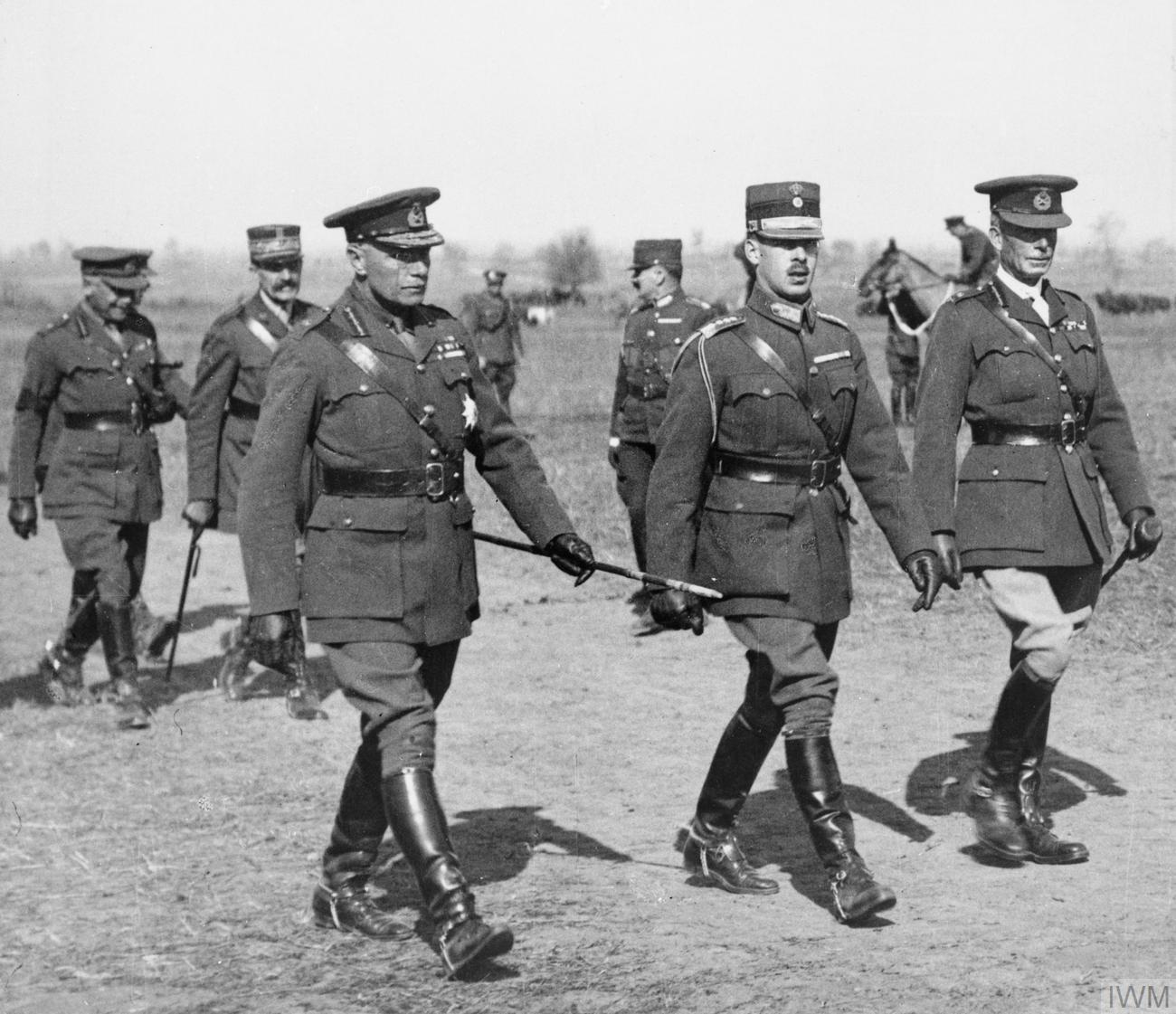
From left to right: Lieutenant General George Milne (commander of the British Salonika Force) with King Alexander I of Greece and Lieutenant General Charles Briggs, GOC XVI Corps of the BSF, 1917.

Finally on 10 June 1917, Charles Jonnart, the Entente's High Commissioner in Greece, ordered King Constantine to give up his power. On the threat of Entente forces landing in Piraeus, the king conceded and agreed to go into self-exile, though without officially abdicating his crown. The Allies, while determined to be rid of Constantine, did not wish to create a Greek republic, and sought to replace the king with another member of the royal family. Crown Prince George, who was the natural heir, was ruled out by the Allies because they thought him too pro-German, like his father. Instead, they considered installing Constantine's brother (and Alexander's uncle), Prince George, but he had tired of public life during his difficult tenure as High Commissioner of Crete between 1901 and 1905; above all, he sought to remain loyal to his brother, and categorically refused to take the throne. As a result, Constantine's second son, Prince Alexander, was chosen to become the new monarch.

== Reign ==
=== Accession ===
The dismissal of Constantine was not unanimously supported by the Entente powers; while France and Britain did nothing to stop Jonnart's actions, the Russian provisional government officially protested to Paris. Petrograd demanded that Alexander should not receive the title of king but only that of regent, so as to preserve the rights of the deposed sovereign and the Crown Prince. Russia's protests were brushed aside, and Alexander ascended the Greek throne.

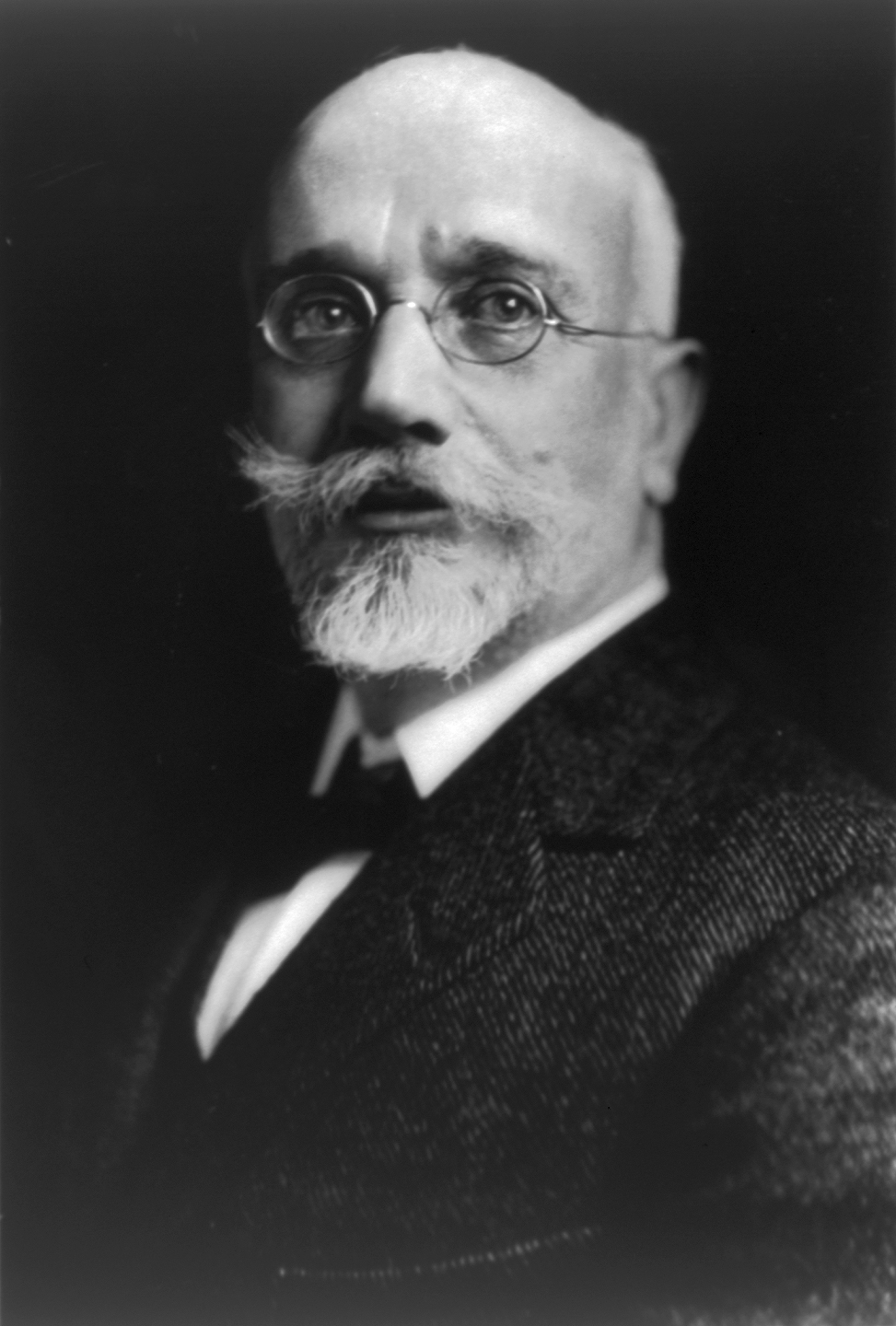
Eleftherios Venizelos, Greek revolutionary and prime minister, c. 1919

Alexander swore the oath of loyalty to the Greek constitution on the afternoon of 11 June 1917 in the ballroom of the Royal Palace. Apart from the Archbishop of Athens, Theocletus I, who administered the oath, only King Constantine I, Crown Prince George and the king's prime minister, Alexandros Zaimis, attended. There were no festivities. The 23-year-old Alexander had a broken voice and tears in his eyes as he made the solemn declaration. He knew that the Entente and the Venizelists would hold real power and that neither his father nor his brother had renounced their claims to the throne. Constantine had informed his son that he should consider himself a regent, rather than a true monarch.

In the evening, after the ceremony, the royal family decided to leave their palace in Athens for Tatoi, but city residents opposed the exile of their sovereign and crowds formed outside the palace to prevent Constantine and his family from leaving. On 12 June, the former king and his family escaped undetected from their residence by feigning departure from one gate while exiting through another. At Tatoi, Constantine again impressed upon Alexander that he held the crown in trust only. It was the last time that Alexander would be in direct contact with his family. The next day, Constantine, Sophia and all of their children except Alexander arrived at the small port of Oropos and set off into exile.

=== Puppet king ===
With his parents and siblings in exile, Alexander found himself isolated. The royals remained unpopular with the Venizelists, and Entente representatives advised the king's aunts and uncles, particularly Prince Nicholas, to leave. Eventually, they all followed Constantine into exile. Royal household staff were gradually replaced by enemies of the former king, and Alexander's allies were either imprisoned or distanced from him. Portraits of the royal family were removed from public buildings, and Alexander's new ministers openly called him the "son of a traitor".

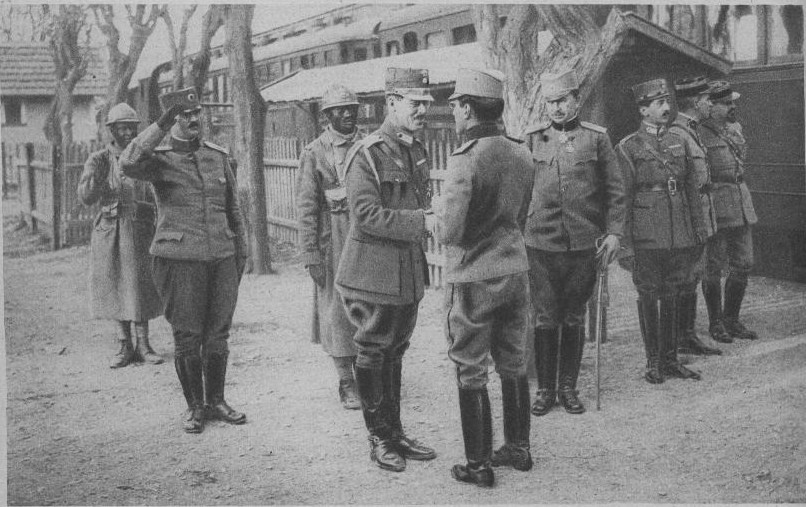
Alexander (centre) shaking hands with prince-regent Alexander of Serbia on the Macedonian Front, May 1918

On 26 June 1917, the king was forced to name Eleftherios Venizelos as head of the government. Despite promises given by the Entente on Constantine's departure, the previous prime minister, Zaimis, was effectively forced to resign as Venizelos returned to Athens. Alexander immediately opposed his new prime minister's views and, annoyed by the king's rebuffs, Venizelos threatened to remove him and set up a regency council in the name of Alexander's brother Prince Paul, then still a minor. The Entente powers intervened and asked Venizelos to back down, allowing Alexander to retain the crown. Spied on day and night by the prime minister's supporters, the monarch quickly became a prisoner in his own palace, and his orders went ignored.

Alexander had no experience in affairs of state. However, he was determined to make the best of a difficult situation and to represent his father as best he could. Adopting an air of cool indifference to the government, he rarely made the effort to read official documents before he rubber-stamped them. His functions were limited, and amounted to visiting the Macedonian front to support the morale of the Greek and Allied troops. Since Venizelos's return to power, Athens was at war with the Central Powers, and Greek soldiers battled those of Bulgaria in the north.

=== Greek expansion ===
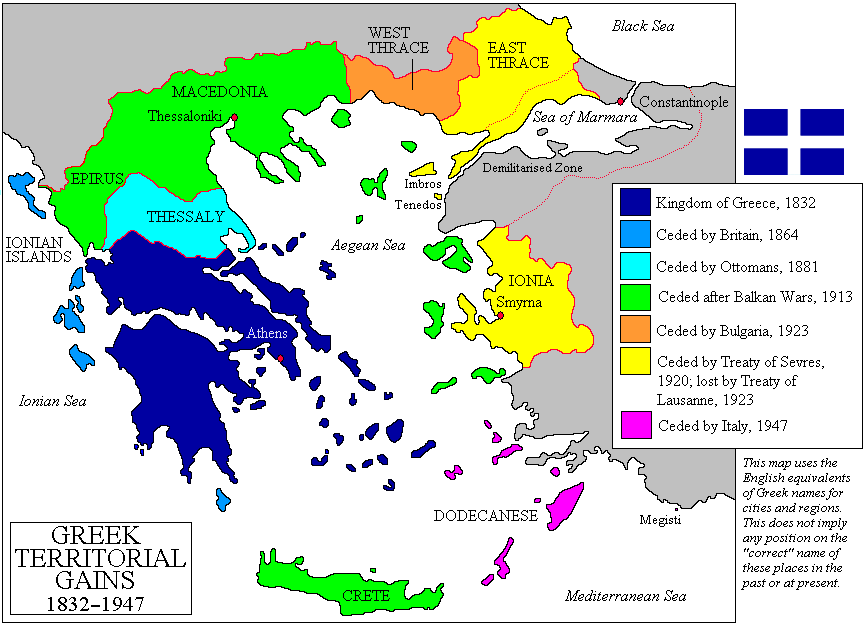
Territorial expansion of Greece between 1832 and 1947

By the end of World War I, Greece had grown beyond its 1914 borders, and the treaties of Neuilly (1919) and Sèvres (1920) confirmed the Greek territorial conquests. The majority of Thrace (previously split between Bulgaria and Turkey) and several Aegean Islands (such as Imbros and Tenedos) became part of Greece, and the region of Smyrna, in Ionia, was placed under Greek mandate. Alexander's kingdom increased in size by around a third. In Paris, Venizelos took part in the peace negotiations with the Ottoman Empire and Bulgaria. Upon his return to Greece in August 1920, Venizelos received a laurel crown from the king for his work in support of panhellenism.

Despite their territorial gains following the Paris Peace Conference, the Greeks still hoped to achieve the Megali Idea and annex Constantinople and larger areas of Ottoman Asia Minor; they invaded Anatolia beyond Smyrna and sought to take Ankara, with the aim of destroying the Turkish resistance led by Mustafa Kemal (later known as Atatürk). Thus began the Greco-Turkish War (1919–1922). Although Alexander's reign saw success after success for the Greek armies, it was eventually Atatürk's revolutionary forces that obtained victory in 1922, negating the gains made under Alexander. (Note: The Treaty of Lausanne in 1923 redrew the boundary between Turkey and Greece back in favor of Turkey.)

== Marriage ==
=== Controversy ===
On 12 June 1917, the day after his accession, Alexander revealed his liaison with Aspasia Manos to his father and asked for his permission to marry her. Constantine was reluctant to let his son marry a non-royal, and demanded that Alexander wait until the end of the war before considering the engagement, to which Alexander agreed. In the intervening months, Alexander increasingly resented his separation from his family. His regular letters to his parents were intercepted by the government and confiscated. Alexander's only source of comfort was Aspasia, and he decided to marry her despite his father's request.

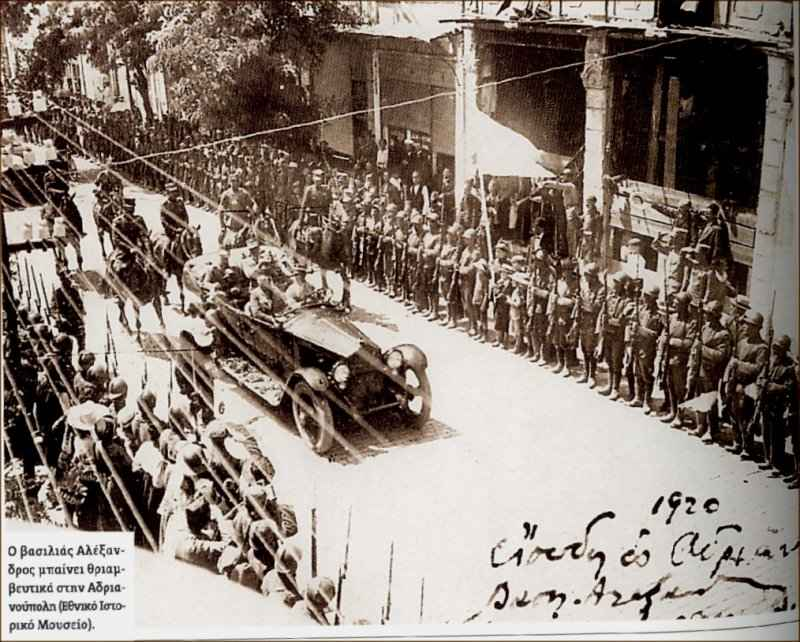
Alexander entering Adrianople, 1920

The ruling dynasty of Greece (the House of Glücksburg) was of German-Danish origin, and Constantine and Sophia were seen as far too German by the Venizelists, but even though the marriage of the king to a Greek presented an opportunity to Hellenize the royal family, and counter criticisms that it was a foreign institution, both Venizelists and Constantinists opposed the match. The Venizelists feared it would give Alexander a means to communicate with his exiled family through Colonel Manos and both sides of the political divide were unhappy at the king marrying a commoner. Although Venizelos was a friend of Petros Manos, the prime minister warned the king that marrying her would be unpopular in the eyes of the people. (Note: According to Prince Peter of Greece and Denmark, Venizelos "encouraged the marriage [of Alexander and Aspasia] to acquire political advantage for himself and his party by bringing the royal family thus into disrepute." However, Irene Noel Baker told her father-in-law, British MP Joseph Allen Baker, that Venizelos was "personally in favour of the marriage [but] is sincerely convinced that it will be extremely unpopular".)

When Alexander's great-uncle Prince Arthur, Duke of Connaught and Strathearn, (Note: The Duke of Connaught was a son of Alexander's great-grandmother, Queen Victoria.) visited Athens in March 1918, to confer the Order of the Bath upon the king, Alexander feared that a marriage between him and Princess Mary of the United Kingdom would be discussed as part of an attempt to consolidate the relationship between Greece and Britain. To Alexander's relief, Arthur asked to meet Aspasia, and declared that, if he were younger, he would have sought to marry her himself. For the foreign powers, and particularly the British ambassador, the marriage was seen as positive. The British authorities feared that Alexander would abdicate in order to marry Aspasia if the wedding was blocked, and they wanted to avoid Greece becoming a republic in case it led to instability or an increase in French influence at their expense.

Alexander's parents were not so happy about the match. Sophia disapproved of her son marrying a commoner, while Constantine wanted a delay but was prepared to be his son's best man if Alexander would be patient. Alexander visited Paris at the end of 1918, raising hopes among his family that they would be able to contact him once he was outside Greece. When Queen Sophia attempted to telephone her son in his Parisian hotel, a minister intercepted the call and informed her that "His Majesty is sorry, but he cannot respond to the telephone". He was not even informed that she had called.

=== Public scandal ===
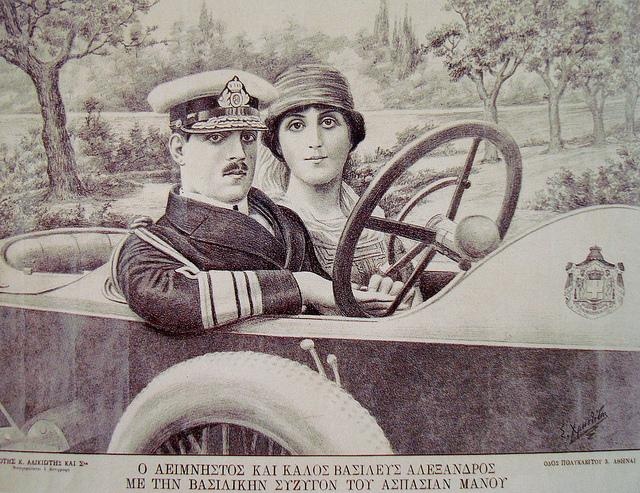
Aspasia Manos and King Alexander depicted at the wheel of his Packard in a contemporary lithograph

With the help of Aspasia's brother-in-law, Christo Zalocostas, and after three unsuccessful attempts, the couple eventually married in secret before a royal chaplain, Archimandrite Zacharistas, on the evening of 17 November 1919. After the ceremony, the archimandrite was sworn to silence but soon broke his promise by confessing to the Archbishop of Athens, Meletios Metaxakis. According to the Greek constitution, members of the royal family had to obtain permission to marry from both the sovereign and the head of the Greek Orthodox Church. By marrying Aspasia without the permission of the Archbishop, Alexander caused a major scandal.

Despite his disapproval of the union, Venizelos allowed Aspasia and her mother to move into the Royal Palace on condition that the marriage remain secret. The information leaked, however, and to escape public opprobrium Aspasia was forced to leave Greece. She fled to Rome, and then to Paris, where Alexander was allowed to join her, six months later, on condition that they not attend official functions together. On their Parisian honeymoon, while motoring near Fontainebleau, the couple witnessed a serious car crash in which Count de Kergariou's chauffeur lost control of his master's vehicle. Alexander avoided the count's car, which swerved and hit a tree. The king drove the injured to hospital in his own car, while Aspasia, who had trained as a nurse during World War I, rendered first aid. The count was seriously injured and died shortly afterward, after having both legs amputated. (Note: Count Alain de Kergariou (died 29 May 1920 aged 38) was an officer in the French Air Service during World War I. He was motoring with his wife and two stepsons, the princes de Tonnay-Charente, when the accident happened. The countess was bruised but otherwise uninjured; one of her sons lost an arm.)

The government allowed the couple to return to Greece in mid-1920. Although their marriage was legalized, Aspasia was not recognized as queen, but was instead known as "Madame Manos". At first, she stayed at her sister's house in the Greek capital before transferring to Tatoi, and it was during this period that she became pregnant with Alexander's child.

Alexander visited the newly acquired territories of West Thrace, and on 8 July 1920 the new name for the region's main town—Alexandroupolis (meaning "city of Alexander" in Greek)—was announced in the king's presence. The city's previous name of Dedeagatch was considered too Turkish. On 7 September, Venizelos, counting on a surge of support in the wake of the signing of the Treaty of Sèvres and the expansion of Greek territory, announced a general election for early November.

== Death ==
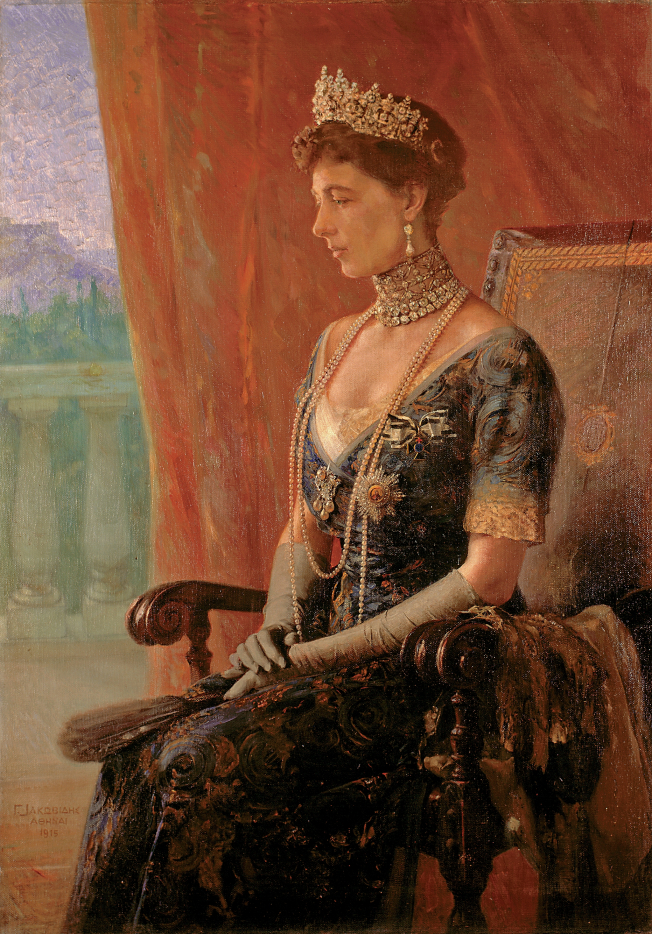
Alexander's mother, Queen Sophia of Greece, by Georgios Jakobides, 1915

On 2 October 1920, Alexander was injured while walking through the grounds of the Tatoi estate. A domestic Barbary macaque belonging to the steward of the palace's grapevines attacked or was attacked by the king's German Shepherd dog, Fritz, (Note: The dog had been found in an enemy trench during World War I by a British officer, who had presented it to Alexander as a gift.) and Alexander attempted to separate the two animals. As he did so, another monkey attacked Alexander and bit him deeply on the leg and torso. Eventually servants arrived and chased away the monkeys, and the king's wounds were promptly cleaned and dressed but not cauterized. He did not consider the incident serious and asked that it not be publicized.

That evening, his wounds became infected; he developed a strong fever and sepsis set in. His doctors considered amputating his leg, but none wished to take responsibility for so drastic an act. On 19 October, he became delirious and called out for his mother, but the Greek government refused to allow her to re-enter the country from exile in Switzerland, despite her own protestations. Finally, the queen dowager, Olga, George I's widow and Alexander's grandmother, was allowed to return alone to Athens to tend to the king. She was delayed by rough waters, however, and by the time she arrived, Alexander had already died of sepsis twelve hours previously at a little after 4 p.m. on 25 October 1920. The other members of the royal family received the news by telegram that night. (Note: Prince Nicolas received the news first but did not communicate it to Alexander's parents until the next morning because he did not wish to disturb their rest.)

Two days later, Alexander's body was conveyed to Athens Cathedral, where it lay in state until his funeral on 29 October. Once again, the royal family were refused permission to return to Greece, and Queen Olga was the only member who attended. Foreign powers were represented by the Prince Regent of Serbia with his sister Princess Helen wife of John Constantinovich of Russia, the Crown Prince of Sweden with his uncle Prince Eugene, Duke of Nericia, and Rear-Admirals Sir George Hope of the United Kingdom and Dumesnil of France, as well as members of the Athens diplomatic corps.

After the cathedral service, Alexander's body was interred on the grounds of the royal estate at Tatoi. The Greek royal family never regarded Alexander's reign as fully legitimate. In the royal cemetery, while other monarchs are given the inscription "King of the Hellenes, Prince of Denmark", Alexander's reads "Alexander, son of the King of the Hellenes, Prince of Denmark. He ruled in the place of his father from 14 June 1917 to 25 October 1920." According to Alexander's favorite sister, Queen Helen of Romania, this feeling of illegitimacy was also shared by Alexander himself, a sentiment that helps explain his mésalliance with Aspasia Manos.

== Legacy ==
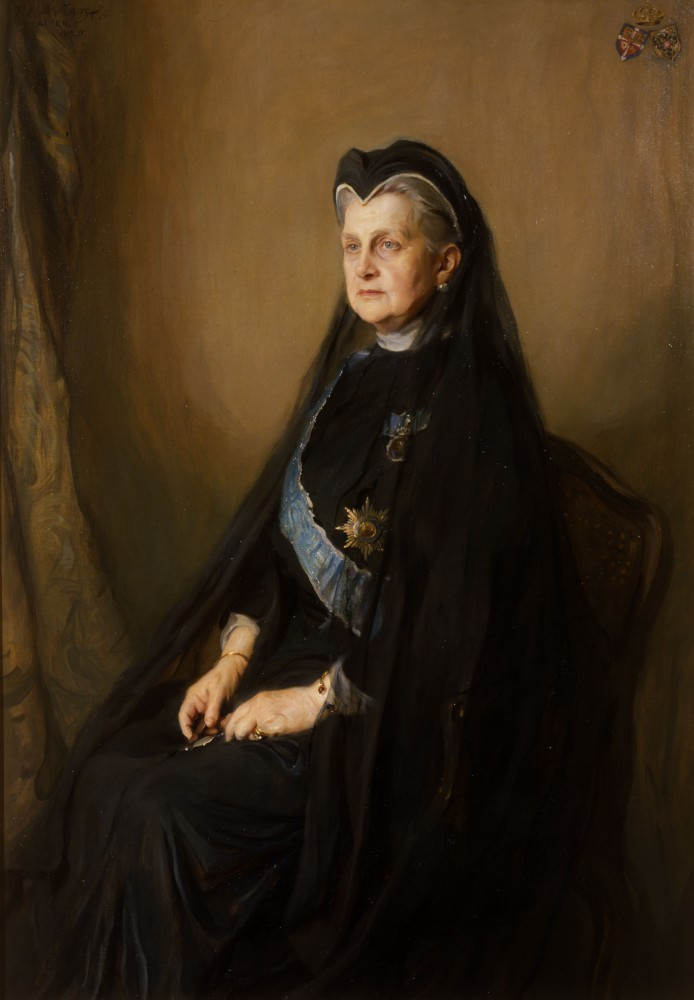
Alexander's paternal grandmother, Queen Olga of Greece, by Philip Alexius de László, 1914. She acted as regent between his death and the restoration of his father.

Alexander's death raised questions about the succession to the throne as well as the nature of the Greek regime. As the king had contracted an unequal marriage, (Note: Here "unequal marriage" refers to the union between a person of royal rank with an individual of a "lower" social status. This is similar to the morganatic marriages of other European countries, though this concept did not exist in Greece.) his descendants were not in the line of succession. (Note: The restored King Constantine did not recognize Alexander's only child, Alexandra, as a member of the House of Greece until July 1922. However, as the Greek succession was governed by Salic law until the beginning of the reign of Constantine II, she would not have been eligible as a female anyway.) The Hellenic Parliament demanded that Constantine I and Crown Prince George be excluded from the succession but sought to preserve the monarchy by selecting another member of the royal house as the new sovereign. On 29 October 1920, the Greek minister in Berne, acting under the direction of the Greek authorities, offered the throne to Alexander's younger brother, Prince Paul. Paul, however, refused to become king while his father and elder brother were alive, insisting that neither of them had renounced their rights to the throne and that he therefore could never legitimately wear the crown.

The throne remained vacant and the legislative elections of 1920 turned into an open conflict between the Venizelists, who favored republicanism, and the supporters of the ex-King Constantine. On 14 November 1920, with the war with Turkey dragging on, the monarchists won, and Dimitrios Rallis became prime minister; Venizelos (who lost his own parliamentary seat) chose to leave Greece in self-exile. Rallis asked Queen Olga to become regent until Constantine's return.

Under the restored King Constantine I, whose return was endorsed overwhelmingly in a referendum, Greece went on to lose the Greco–Turkish War with heavy military and civilian casualties. The territory gained on the Turkish mainland during Alexander's reign was lost. Alexander's death in the midst of an election campaign helped destabilize the Venizelos regime, and the resultant loss of Allied support contributed to the failure of Greece's territorial ambitions. Winston Churchill wrote, "it is perhaps no exaggeration to remark that a quarter of a million persons died of this monkey's bite."

=== Issue ===
Alexander's daughter by Aspasia Manos, Alexandra (1921–1993), was born five months after his death. Initially, the government took the line that since Alexander had married Aspasia without the permission of his father or the church, his marriage was illegal and his posthumous daughter was illegitimate. However, in July 1922, Parliament passed a law which allowed the King to recognize royal marriages retroactively on a non-dynastic basis. That September, Constantine—at Sophia's insistence—recognized his son's marriage to Aspasia and granted her the style of "Princess Alexander". Her daughter (Constantine I's granddaughter) was legitimized as a princess of Greece and Denmark, and later married King Peter II of Yugoslavia in London in 1944. They had one child: Alexander, Crown Prince of Yugoslavia.

== Ancestry ==
Ancestors of Alexander of Greece

Christian IX of Denmark
George I, King of the Hellenes
Princess Louise of Hesse-Kassel
Constantine I, King of the Hellenes
Grand Duke Constantine Nikolaevich of Russia
Grand Duchess Olga Constantinovna of Russia
Princess Alexandra of Saxe-Altenburg
Alexander, King of the Hellenes
William I, German Emperor
Frederick III, German Emperor
Princess Augusta of Saxe-Weimar
Princess Sophia of Prussia
Prince Albert of Saxe-Coburg and Gotha
Victoria, Princess Royal
Queen Victoria of the United Kingdom

== Footnotes and references ==
=== Sources ===
- Bertin, Célia (1982). Marie Bonaparte (in French). Paris: Perrin. ISBN 2-262-01602-X.
- Carter, Miranda (2009). The Three Emperors. London: Penguin Books. ISBN 978-0-670-91556-9.
- Churchill, Winston S. (1929). The World Crisis Volume 5: The Aftermath (1918–1928). London: Butterworth.
- Diesbach, Ghislain de (1967). Secrets of the Gotha. translated from the French by Margaret Crosland. London: Chapman & Hall.
- Driault, Édouard; Lhéritier, Michel (1926). Histoire diplomatique de la Grèce de 1821 à nos jours [Diplomatic History of Greece from 1821 to today] (in French). Vol. V. Paris: PUF.
- Fry, Michael Graham; Goldstein, Erik; Langhorne, Richard (2002). Guide to International Relations and Diplomacy. London and New York: Continuum. ISBN 0-8264-5250-7.
- Goldstein, Erik (1992). War and Peace Treaties 1816–1991. London: Routledge. ISBN 0-415-07822-9.
- Kargakos, Sarantos I. (2000). Αλεξανδρούπολη: Μια νέα πόλη με παλιά ιστορία [Alexandroupoli: A New City with an Old History] (in Greek). Athens: Privately printed. OCLC 47927958.
- Llewellyn-Smith, Michael (1998) [1973]. Ionian Vision: Greece in Asia Minor 1919–1922. London: Hurst & Co. ISBN 1-85065-413-1.
- Maclagan, Michael; Louda, Jiří (1999). Lines of Succession: Heraldry of the Royal Families of Europe. London: Little, Brown & Co. ISBN 1-85605-469-1.
- Montgomery-Massingberd, Hugh, ed. (1977). Burke's Royal Families of the World, 1st edition. London: Burke's Peerage. ISBN 0-85011-023-8.
- Pentzopoulos, Dimitri (2002) [1962]. The Balkan Exchange of Minorities and its Impact on Greece. London: Hurst & Co. ISBN 1-85065-674-6.
- Sáinz de Medrano, Ricardo Mateos (2004). La Familia de la Reina Sofía, La Dinastía griega, la Casa de Hannover y los reales primos de Europe [The Family of Queen Sophia, the Greek Dynasty, the House of Hanover and the Royal Cousins of Europe] (in Spanish). Madrid: La Esfera de los Libros. ISBN 84-9734-195-3.
- Van der Kiste, John (1994). Kings of the Hellenes: The Greek Kings, 1863–1974. Dover, New Hampshire and Stroud, Gloucestershire: Sutton Publishing. ISBN 0-7509-0525-5.

Alexander of Greece House of Schleswig-Holstein-Sonderburg-Glücksburg Cadet branch of the House of Oldenburg Born: 1 August 1893 Died: 25 October 1920
Regnal titles
Preceded by Constantine I	King of the Hellenes; 11 June 1917 – 25 October 1920	Succeeded by Constantine I
