= Siege of Adrianople (1913) =

1913 siege by the Ottoman Empire

- Part of Second Balkan War
- Ottoman borders following the Balkan Wars
Date	22–23 July 1913
Location	Edirne
Result	Ottoman victory
Territorial changes	In addition to Edirne, Kırklareli and Dimetoka join the Ottoman lands.

Belligerents
Ottoman Empire	(Tsardom of Bulgaria (1908–1946)) Bulgaria

Commanders and leaders
Enver Pasha; Talat Pasha; Ahmet İzzet Pasha	(Tsardom of Bulgaria (1908–1946)) Vulko Velchev

Units involved
(Ottoman Empire) 1st Army (Ottoman Empire) 2nd Army (Ottoman Empire) 3rd Army (Ottoman Empire) 4st Army	(Tsardom of Bulgaria (1908–1946)) 2–3 infantry regiments (Tsardom of Bulgaria (1908–1946)) 2 cavalry regiments

Strength
200,000–250,000	4,000

Casualties and losses
4,000 dead of disease	Unknown

The Siege of Adrianople refers to the recapture of the city on July 21, 1913, by the Ottoman Army under the command of War Minister Enver Pasha and the Commander-in-Chief of the Ottoman Army Ahmed Izzet Pasha, during the Second Balkan War. The city, which had been ceded to the Bulgaria following the Siege of Adrianople (1912–1913) in the First Balkan War, was liberated along with Kırklareli and Dimetoka.

== Background ==
After the First Balkan War, the Second Balkan War broke out due to disagreements between Bulgaria and its former allies. Bulgaria was forced into war against Greece, Serbia, and Montenegro. While Bulgaria was occupied with this conflict, Romania seized the opportunity and invaded Southern Dobruja, a territory it had long disputed with Bulgaria. The collapse of the Balkan alliance and the outbreak of fighting among its members came as a surprise to the Ottoman Empire. The fact that the states that had united and fought for their ambitions against the Ottoman Empire just six months earlier were now at war with each other after achieving their goals, initially led the Ottoman Empire to adopt a hesitant stance. The Ottoman Empire's reluctance to join the Greek-Serbian alliance stemmed from this hesitation. This was another reason for the Ottoman Empire's silence at the beginning of the Second Balkan War, following the heavy losses in the First Balkan War. However, the dire situation in Bulgaria caught the attention of the Ottomans. The Bulgarians were unable to offer the expected resistance to the Romanian forces' occupation of Dobruja. This situation was seen as a great opportunity by the staff officers within the Ottoman Empire. It was determined that in the region, especially in the Edirne area, the Bulgarians had withdrawn almost all their armies and corps and sent them to the Serbian, Greek and, due to the new situation, Romanian lines, leaving only a garrison of 4,000 men under the command of Major General Vulko Velchev in Edirne. The idea of liberating Edirne and Western Thrace was presented to Sultan Mehmed V by the staff officers of the Ottoman Empire. The Sultan approved the plan, seeing it as a way to improve the Ottoman image, and a decision was made to launch a surprise attack.

However, before that, the Sublime Porte first sounded out the situation by summoning the British, French, and Russian ambassadors. The British, French, and Russian ambassadors stated that they were against a possible Ottoman intervention in Bulgarian territory and that the Ottoman Empire should remain faithful to the Treaty of London.

British Foreign Minister Sir Edward Grey made a threatening speech in the House of Commons, stating that the Ottomans should respect the signed agreements, otherwise, if they tried to take back Edirne by taking advantage of the disaster suffered by the Bulgarians, the punishment they would face would be very severe, and they would lose not only all of Europe but even Istanbul. In short, Britain opposed the Ottoman move towards Edirne.

The lack of resistance to the Romanian invasion convinced the Ottomans to invade the territories just ceded to Bulgaria. The main object of the invasion was the recovery of Edirne (Adrianople), which was held by Major General Vulko Velchev with a mere 4,000 troops. Most Bulgarian forces occupying East Thrace had been withdrawn to face the Serbo-Greek attack earlier in the year. On 12 July, Ottoman troops garrisoning Çatalca and Gelibolu reached the Enos–Midia line and on 20 July 1913 crossed the line and invaded Bulgaria. The entire Ottoman invasion force contained between 200,000 and 250,000 men under the command of Ahmed Izzet Pasha. The 1st Army was stationed at the eastern (Midia) end of the line. From east to west it was followed by the 2nd Army, 3rd Army and 4th Army, which was stationed at Gelibolu.

== Events ==
The Ottoman army under the command of Enver Pasha he entered Adrianople on 22 July 1913. Edirne, Kırklareli and Dimetoka were taken back and the Bulgarians could not show much resistance as they were being attacked from every region. Edirne (Adrianople) came under Turkish rule again. The Ottoman Empire won its last victory in the Balkans and did not lose a great deal of territory in Thrace until the First World War. The re-inclusion of Edirne in the Ottoman lands became official only with the Treaty of Constantinople (1913) signed with the Kingdom of Bulgaria on September 29, 1913. While United Kingdom sent some warships to Gelibolu to stop the Ottoman advance after it captured Edirne, Russia threatened the Ottomans with attacking their Caucasus provinces, namely their lands in Eastern Anatolia.

The Ottoman armies did not stop at the old border but crossed into Bulgarian territory. A cavalry unit advanced on Yambol and captured it on 25 July. The Ottoman invasion, more than the Romanian, incited panic among the peasantry, a number of whom fled to the mountains. Among the leadership, it was recognized as a complete reversal of fortune. In the words of historian Richard Hall, "[t]he battlefields of eastern Thrace, where so many Bulgarian soldiers had died to win the First Balkan War, were again under Ottoman control." The Ottomans lost 4,000 soldiers to cholera. Separately, an Ottoman reconnaissance unit led by Captain Reşit Bey was ambushed by the Bulgarians. Reşit Bey was killed in the ensuing clash, and his unit suffered casualties.

== Aftermath ==
The Ottoman Empire halted its advance, and Edirne, Kırklareli, Lüleburgaz, Karaağaç, and Dimetoka were returned to Ottoman control. Ottoman military losses were relatively small, similar to Romania's, although 4,000 soldiers died of cholera during or immediately after the campaign. The Ottoman Empire won its last victory in the Balkans and did not lose much territory in Thrace until World War I. Although Ottoman forces captured the city on July 21st, Edirne's reintegration into Ottoman territory was only officially formalized with the Treaty of Istanbul signed with the Kingdom of Bulgaria on September 29, 1913.

However, two years after the Second Balkan War, everything changed, and the Ottoman Empire and Bulgaria were forced to become allies rather than enemies. When World War I broke out, the Ottoman Empire joined the war alongside Germany and the Austro-Hungarian Empire, while Serbia and Romania joined the Entente powers. In 1915, the Ottoman Empire's connection with Germany ran through Bulgaria, which remained neutral. The Ottoman Empire returned to the negotiating table with Bulgaria. The 1915 Ottoman-Bulgarian Border Rectification Agreement was signed, and in exchange for Bulgaria joining the war alongside the Ottomans, Germany and Austria-Hungary, declaring war on Serbia, and allowing German shipments to the Ottoman Empire, Bulgaria was given back Didymoteicho and the surrounding 2600 km² area. Apart from this, roughly the border of the Thracian territories in present-day Turkey was drawn with this operation.

== Sources ==
- Hall, Richard C. (2000). The Balkan Wars, 1912–1913: Prelude to the First World War. Routledge. ISBN 0-415-22946-4.
- Broadbent, H. (2005). Gallipoli: The Fatal Shore. Camberwell, Victoria: Viking/Penguin. ISBN 0-670-04085-1.
- Fewster, Kevin; Basarin, Vecihi; Basarin, Hatice Hurmuz (2003) [1985]. Gallipoli: The Turkish Story. Crow's Nest, NSW: Allen & Unwin. ISBN 978-1-74114-045-3.
