= Romanian landings in Bulgaria =

Military conflict during the Second Balkan War

- Part of the Second Balkan War
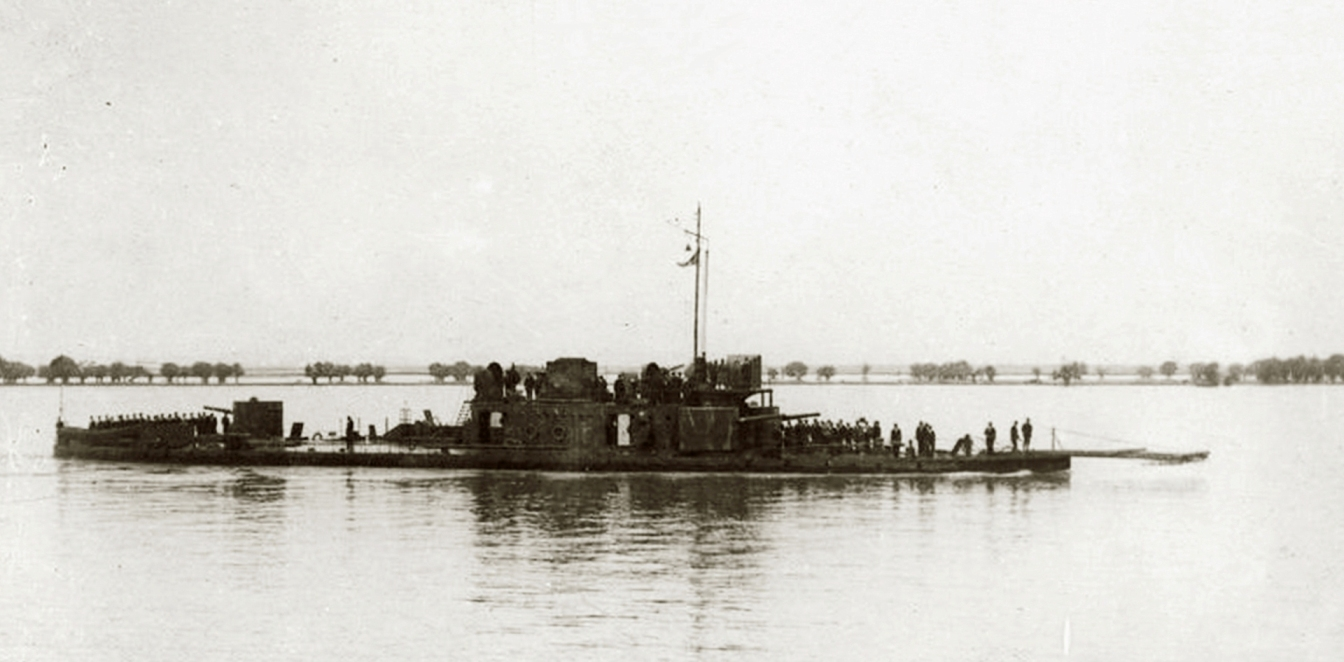
- Romanian river monitor
Date	14–15 July [O.S. 1–2 July] 1913
Location	Across the Danube from Corabia, Romania 43°44′53.26″N 24°34′9.83″E
Result	Romanian victory: Treaty of Bucharest

Belligerents
Romania	Bulgaria

Commanders and leaders
Eustațiu Sebastian	Unknown

Strength
3 river monitors 6 torpedo boats 1 gunboat	4 gunboats 4 motorboats

Casualties and losses
2 boats scuttled	4 gunboats scuttled

The Romanian landings in Bulgaria were a decisive military action during the Second Balkan War. In as much as Bulgaria was fighting both Greece and Serbia at the time, the Romanian invasion made the situation untenable for the Bulgarians, who were forced to ask for peace two weeks later.

== Background ==
Bulgarian dissatisfaction with its share of the spoils in the aftermath of the First Balkan War led to the souring of relations between Bulgaria and its former allies, Serbia and Greece. Tensions escalated towards the end of June [O.S. mid-June] 1913, when Bulgaria launched attacks against both Serbia and Greece, igniting the Second Balkan War.

Romania mobilised its army on 5 July [O.S. 23 June] 1913, with the intention of seizing Southern Dobruja, and declared war on Bulgaria on 10 July [O.S. 28 June] 1913. In a diplomatic circular that said, "Romania does not intend either to subjugate the polity nor defeat the army of Bulgaria", the Romanian government endeavoured to allay international concerns about its motives and increased bloodshed.

== Romanian invasion ==
The Romanian warships which carried out the landings were concentrated at Corabia, on the Romanian side of the Danube, under the command of Admiral Eustațiu Sebastian. This group consisted of three monitors, six torpedo boats, and the gunboat Grivița. The first landing was carried out on 14 July [O.S. 1 July] 1913, with no Bulgarian resistance. A second landing was carried out on the following day, and a pontoon bridge was also built. Foreign military strategists considered the bridge a "masterpiece of warfare", as the 950-metre-long (3,120 ft) structure was finished in 26 hours, requiring 125 pontoons.

The Bulgarian naval forces on the Danube mainly consisted of four gunboats, with displacements of 400 to 600 tonnes (390 to 590 long tons; 440 to 660 short tons) and armed with two-to-four 75 mm (3.0 in) guns and two-to-four 47 mm (1.9 in) guns. There were also four motorboats. Faced with the overwhelming superiority of the Romanian warships, the Bulgarians scuttled their four gunboats.

== Aftermath ==
The Romanian troops landed at Oryahovo, Gigen, and Nikopol. Unopposed, the Romanian ground forces advanced quickly, and on 23 July [O.S. 10 July] 1913, Romanian troops entered Vrazhdebna, a suburb just 11 km (7 mi) from Sofia.

The lack of resistance to the Romanian invasion convinced the Ottomans to invade territories just ceded to Bulgaria after the First Balkan War, with the main objective being to reclaim Edirne (Adrianople). The Ottomans advanced rapidly, against virtually no Bulgarian resistance.

An armistice was agreed upon on 31 July [O.S. 18 July] 1913 followed by the 10 August [O.S. 29 July] 1913, Treaty of Bucharest, which ended the war.
