= NMS Grivița =

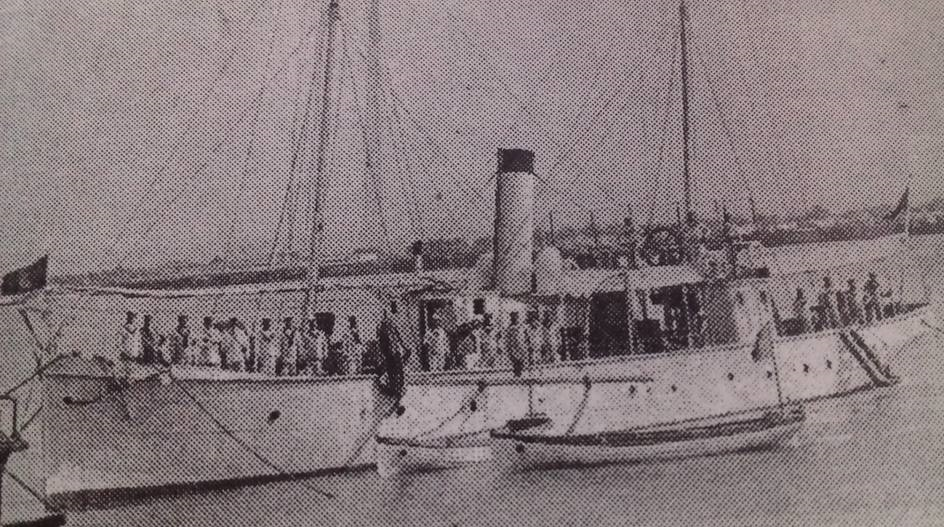
- Grivița in 1913

Class overview
- In commission: 1880–1919
- Completed: 1
- Scrapped: 1

History

Romania
- Name: Grivița
- Namesake: Battle of Grivița
- Ordered: 1880
- Builder: STT, Austria-Hungary
- Laid down: 1880
- Launched: 1880
- Completed: 1880
- Commissioned: 1880
- Out of service: 1919?
- Fate: Unknown

Service record
- Commanders: Captain Vlădescu Constantin (World War I)
- Victories: 1 cargo ship captured

General characteristics (as built)
- Type: Gunboat
- Displacement: 110 tons (standard); 128 tons (full load)
- Length: 60.5 meters
- Beam: 5.2 meters
- Draft: 1.8 meters
- Propulsion: Steam, 180 hp
- Speed: 9 knots (17 km/h; 10 mph)
- Complement: 30
- Armament: 2 × single 57 mm (2.2 in) Nordenfelt guns; 2 × single 37 mm (1.5 in) guns; 2 x machine guns

NMS Grivița was a gunboat of the Romanian Navy, built in 1880. It was the first warship acquired by the Kingdom of Romania after gaining independence in 1878 and the first military ship of the Romanian Black Sea Fleet. Throughout her career, she saw service on both the Black Sea and the Danube during the Second Balkan War and the First World War.

== Description ==
Grivița was the first warship acquired by Romania after its 1877-1878 war of independence. She was built in 1880 by Stabilimento Tecnico Triestino in Austria-Hungary, being the last warship purchased by Romania before the country's conversion to a Kingdom in 1881. She measured 60.5 meters in length, with a beam of 5.2 meters and a draught of 1.8 meters. She displaced 110 tons standard and 128 tons with a full load of coal, had a crew of 30 men and a top speed of 9 knots, generated by a 180 hp steam engine. She was armed with two 57 mm Nordenfelt guns, two 37 mm 1-pounder guns and two machine guns.

== Career ==
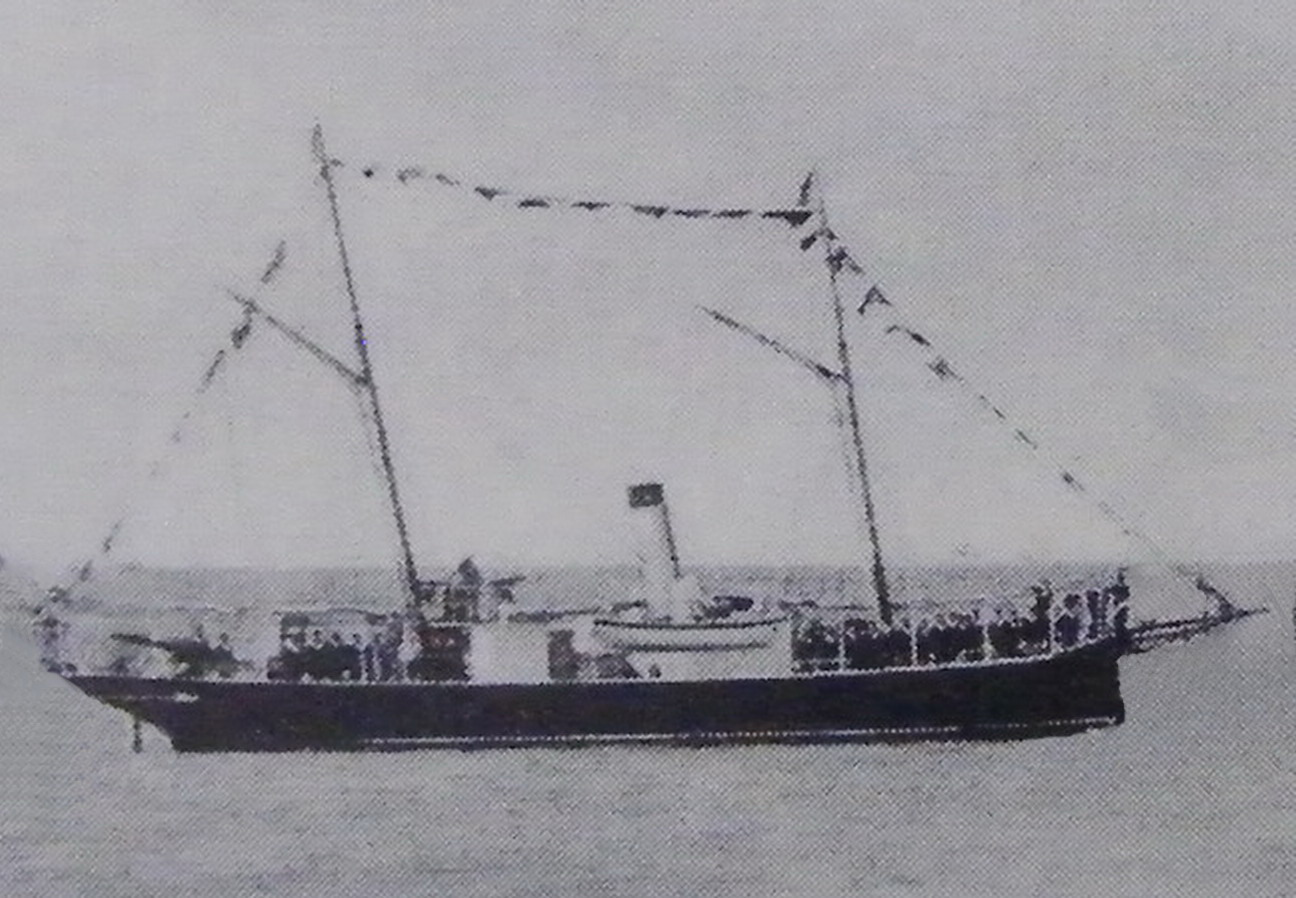
Grivița in 1902

Grivița was ordered in 1880, with the main purpose of enforcing Romanian interests at the newly-established Danube Commission, headquartered in the Romanian port town of Sulina. In 1885-1886, she conducted topographic research off Sulina and the northern half of the Romanian coast. Grivița was brought in Romania by the fleet commander itself.

Between 1886 and 1888, NMS Grivița was commanded by commander Eustațiu Sebastian.

The 1913 Second Balkan War found her on the Danube, where she provided artillery support for the Romanian troops crossing into Bulgaria from Corabia.

When Romania entered the First World War on the side of the Allies in late 1916, she was put at the disposal of the Russian Black Sea Fleet, acting as a liaison ship between the Russian and Romanian forces under the command of Captain Vlădescu Constantin. She was later transferred to the Romanian Danube fleet. In the autumn of 1916, she along with a tug and two barges evacuated the Romanian 37 mm and 57 mm coastal artillery guns from Cinghineaua Island, after the latter ended up 6 kilometres (3.7 mi) behind enemy lines. A few months later, she collided with a Russian ship, but was successfully repaired. After Romania resumed hostilities against the Central Powers in the autumn of 1918, she captured a German cargo ship sailing for Odessa. She was mentioned for the last time in March 1919, her ultimate fate being unknown.

== See also ==
- Grivitsa, the location of the Battle of Grivița the ship is named for
