= Krastyu Marinov =

Bulgarian general

Кръстю Маринов Krastyu Marinov
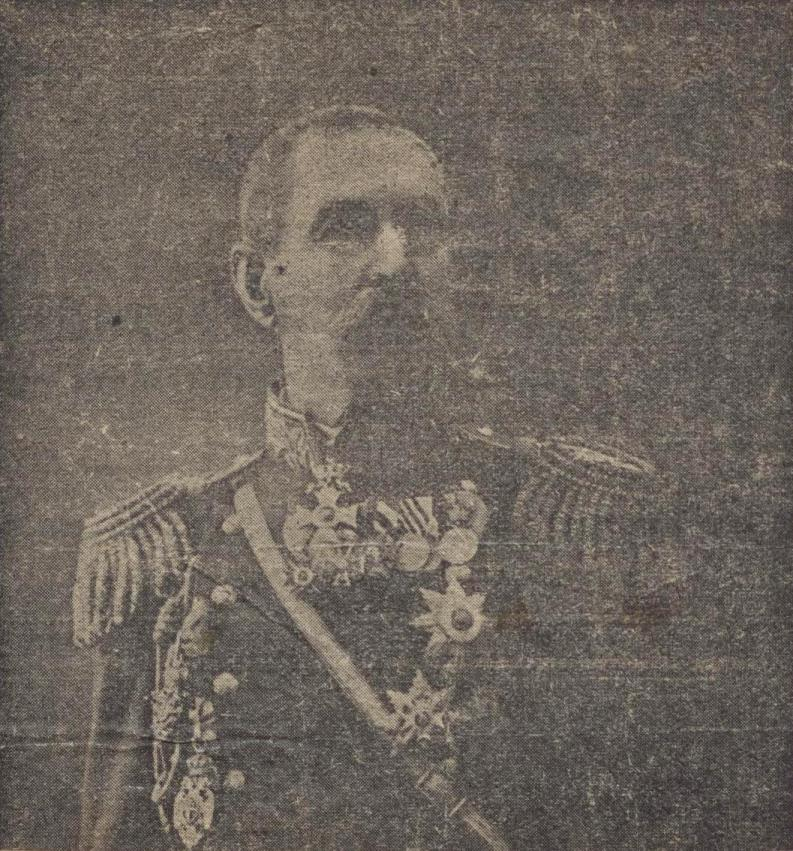
- Born: 24 June 1855; Saedinenie, Adrianople Vilayet, Ottoman Empire
- Died: 5 March 1927 (aged 71); Sofia, Sofia City Province, Kingdom of Bulgaria
- Military career
- Allegiance: Principality of Bulgaria; Kingdom of Bulgaria
- Branch: Bulgarian Volunteer Corps; Bulgarian Land Forces
- Service years: 1877 – 1913
- Rank: Major General
- Conflicts: Russo-Turkish War (1877–1878); Serbo-Bulgarian War; First Balkan War; Bulgarian front; Second Balkan War; Siege of Vidin
- Awards: Order of Bravery; Order of Saint Alexander

Krastyu Marinov Prazov Marinov (24 June 1855 – March 1927) was a Bulgarian volunteer, officer, and major general.

== Biography ==
=== Early life and the Russo-Turkish War ===
Krastyu Marinov was born in 1855 in Saedinenie, Adrianople Vilayet. He took part in the Russo-Turkish War (1877-1878) as a member of the Bulgarian Volunteer Corps in the 10th Volunteer Company.

=== Rumelian officer in the militia ===
In 1879 he graduated from the Vasil Levski National Military University in Sofia and was promoted to the rank of lieutenant. He joined the East Rumelia militia . In the period 1880 - 1881 he was an adjutant of the Governor-General Aleko Bogoridi. On 9 July 1881 he was promoted to the rank of lieutenant and was Assistant Military Prosecutor at the Police Headquarters. On 2 March 1884 he was promoted to the rank of captain . In 1885 he was a company commander in Burgas and Kazanlak. He supported the Union of the Principality of Bulgaria and Eastern Rumelia. On 9 September 1885 he was appointed commander of the V Kazanlak Company of the Yambol detachment.

=== Serbo-Bulgarian War ===
During the Serbo-Bulgarian War, he was commander of the Sheinovsky detachment, with which he fought at the Slivnitsa position, at the mouth of the Lukovitsa River and participated in the Battle of Pirot. On 4 November 1885 he was appointed commander of the XXIII and Shipka Infantry Regiments.

=== The Balkan Wars ===
After the war he served in the IV and Pleven Infantry Regiment, at the garrison in the town of Lovech. Captain Marinov was the first Bulgarian commander to oppose the coup of 9 August 1886. He supported the political course of Stefan Stambolov who was the Commander of the VI and Tarnovo Regiments .

During the First Balkan War was the commander of 6 -a divisional area - Vidin. During the Second Balkan War he was the commandant of the town of Vidin and led the defense of Siege of Vidin.

Major General Krastyu Marinov died in 1927 in Sofia.

In his honor in 1934 the Vidin village of Musumane was renamed to General Marinovo. After 1989, a monument to the general was erected in the village. There is a similar bust-monument in 1936 by sculptor Yanko Pavlov in Rova Park in Vidin, behind Tsar Simeon the Great High School. The plaque reads:

Major General O.Z. Krastyu Marinov

Defender of the Vidin Fortress in 1913, former chief of the 1st and 6th Infantry. divisions, honorary aide-de-camp of NV Tsar, cavalier of the Military Order. "For Courage" III. and IV. 2 One of the most sympathetic military figures, a highly honest and hard-working man - the deceased did not hesitate to refuse and did not deceive his 4. p. The Pleven regiment under oath of allegiance to the detronators did not hesitate during the siege of Vidin in 1913, where he was the commander of the troops. Modest, quiet, he lived in the last 10-15 years forgotten, oppressed by heavy worries in the struggle for existence. A wreath of laurels and glory will adorn his forehead, and history will place him in a prominent place among the builders in Bulgarian. army.

His light soil. A deep bow to his memory.

== Bibliography ==
- Nedev, S., The Command of the Bulgarian Army during the Wars of National Unification, Sofia, 1993, Military Publishing Complex "St. George the Victorious”, p. 97
- The compound 1885, encyclopedic reference book. Sofia: ДState Publishing House "Dr. Peter Beron". 1985., с. 139
