= Treaty of Bucharest (1913) =

Territorial settlement following the Second Balkan War

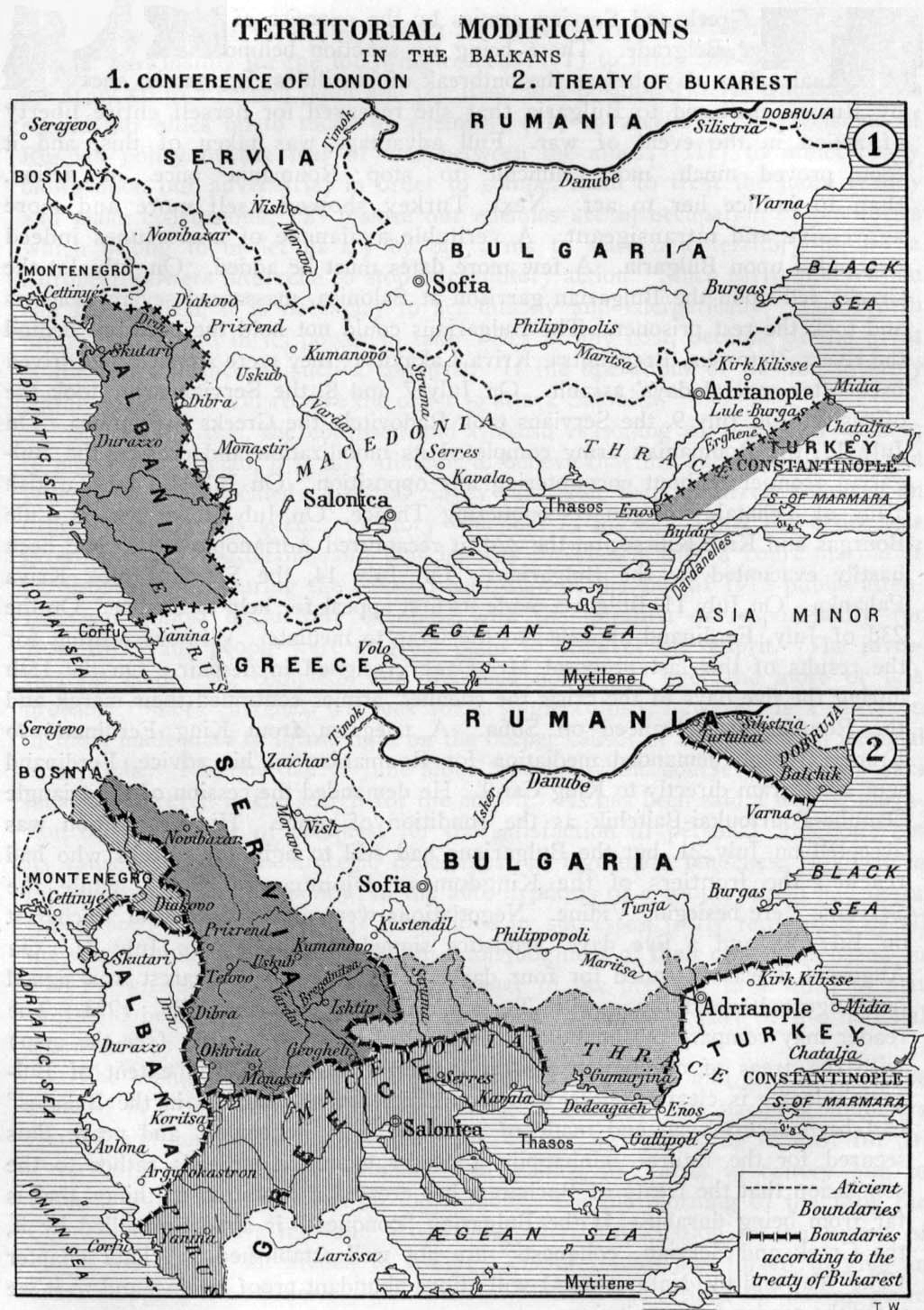
- Borders of the Balkan states after the Treaty of Bucharest (below)
- Signed: 10 August 1913
- Location: Bucharest, Romania
- Parties: Bulgaria; Romania; Serbia; Greece; Montenegro

The Treaty of Bucharest (Romanian: Tratatul de la București; Serbian: Букурештански мир; Bulgarian: Букурещки договор; Greek: Συνθήκη του Βουκουρεστίου) was concluded on 10 August 1913, by the delegates of Bulgaria, Romania, Serbia, Montenegro and Greece. The Treaty was concluded in the aftermath of the Second Balkan War and amended the previous Treaty of London, which ended the First Balkan War. About one month later, the Bulgarians signed a separate border treaty (the Treaty of Constantinople) with the Ottomans, who had regained some territory west of the Enos-Midia Line during the second war.

== Background ==
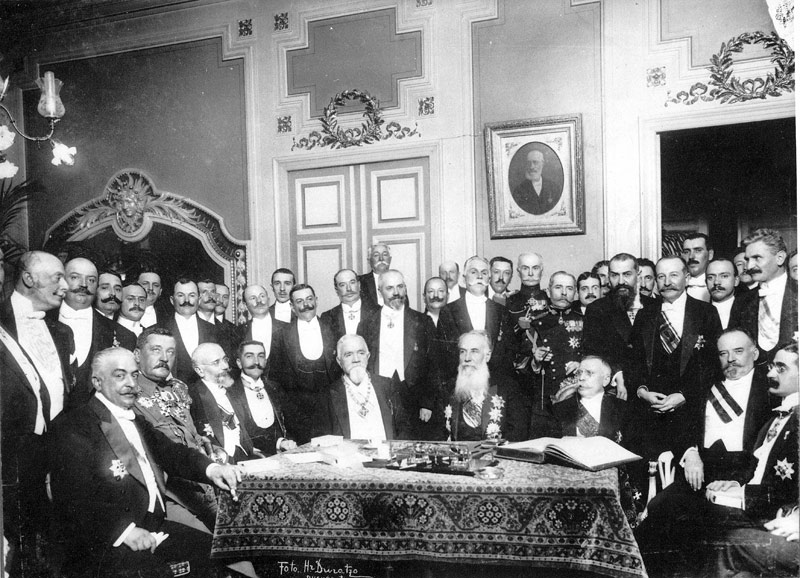
Delegations to the peace conference.Eleftherios Venizelos; Titu Maiorescu; Nikola Pašić (sitting in the center); Dimitar Tonchev; Constantin Dissescu; Nikolaos Politis; Alexandru Marghiloman; Danilo Kalafatović; Constantin Coandă; Constantin Cristescu; Take Ionescu; Miroslav Spalajković; and Janko Vukotić.

Bulgaria, dissatisfied with its gains in the First Balkan War, and especially with Greek and Serbian gains in Macedonia, launched an attack on its former allies in June 1913. The attacks were driven back, and the Greek and Serbian armies invaded Bulgarian-held territory in return. At the same time, the Ottomans advanced into Eastern Thrace and retook Adrianople, while Romania used the opportunity to invade Bulgaria from the north and advance against little opposition to within a short distance of the Bulgarian capital, Sofia. Isolated and surrounded by a more powerful coalition of opponents, Bulgaria was forced to agree to a truce and to peace negotiations to be held in the Romanian capital, Bucharest.

All important arrangements and concessions involving the rectification of the controverted international boundary lines were perfected in a series of committee meetings, incorporated in separate protocols, and formally ratified by subsequent action of the general assembly of delegates. Although the Ottomans had also participated in the Second Balkan War, they were not represented at this treaty. Instead, bilateral treaties were later concluded with Bulgaria (Treaty of Constantinople) and Greece (Treaty of Athens).

== Gains in territory ==
=== Serbia ===
The eastern frontier of Serbia was drawn from the summit of Patarika, on the old frontier, and followed the watershed between the Vardar and the Struma rivers to the Greek-Bulgarian boundary, except that the upper valley of the Strumica remained in the possession of Bulgaria. The territory thus obtained by Serbia engulfed central Vardar Macedonia, including "Ochrida, Monastir, Kosovo, Istib, and Kotchana, and the eastern half of the Sanjak of Novi-Pazar". These territories would today include Novi Pazar in Serbia, Kosovo, and Ohrid, Štip, Kočani and Bitola in present-day North Macedonia. By this arrangement, Serbia increased its territory from 48,300 to 87,780 km^{2} (18,650 to 33,890 sq mi) and its population by more than 1.5 million.

=== Greece ===
The boundary line separating Greece from Bulgaria was drawn from the crest of Belasica to the mouth of the Mesta (Nestos), on the Aegean Sea. This important territorial concession, which Bulgaria resolutely contested, in compliance with the instructions embraced in the notes which the Russian Empire and Austria-Hungary presented to the conference, increased the area of Greece from 64,790 to 108,610 km^{2} (25,020 to 41,930 sq mi) and its population from 2,660,000 to 4,363,000.

The territory thus gained included large parts of Epirus and Macedonia, including Thessaloniki. The Greek-Bulgarian border was moved eastwards to beyond Kavala, thus restricting the Aegean seaboard of Bulgaria to an inconsiderable extent of 110 km, with only Dedeagach (modern Alexandroupoli) as a seaport. Within this region was also Florina. In addition, Crete was definitively assigned to Greece and was formally taken over on 14 December that year.

=== Bulgaria ===
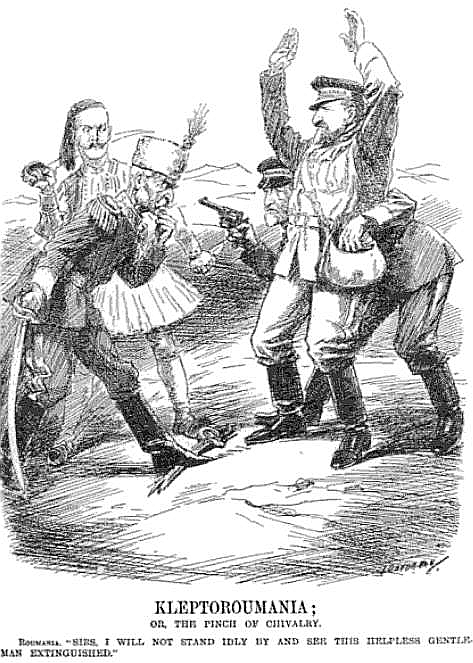
Punch cartoon on the treaty: King Carol I of Romania holds King Peter I of Serbia and King Constantine I of Greece at gunpoint while he steals Southern Dobruja from Tsar Ferdinand I of Bulgaria.

Bulgaria's share of the spoils, although greatly reduced, was not entirely negligible. Its net gains in territory, which embraced a portion of Macedonia, Pirin Macedonia (or Bulgarian Macedonia), including the town of Strumica, Western Thrace, and 110 km of the Aegean littoral, were about 25,030 km^{2} (9,660 sq mi), and its population was increased by 129,490.

In addition, Bulgaria agreed to dismantle all existing fortresses and bound itself not to construct forts at Rousse or Shumen or in any of the territory between these two cities, or within a radius of 20 kilometers around Balchik.

=== Romania ===
Territory of Bulgaria ceded to Romania after the Bucharest Treaty

Bulgaria ceded to Romania Southern Dobruja, lying north of a line extending from the Danube just above Tutrakan (Turtucaia) to the western shore of the Black Sea, south of Ekrene (Ecrene); Southern Dobruja has an approximate area of 6,960 km^{2} (2,690 sq mi), a population of 286,000, and includes the fortress of Silistra and the cities of Tutrakan on the Danube and Balchik (Balcic) on the Black Sea.

=== Montenegro ===
The treaty awarded the regions of Berane, Ipek and Gjakova (Metohija) to Montenegro.

== Perception ==
According to Anderson and Hershey, the severe terms imposed on Bulgaria contrasted the ambitions of its government upon the entry into the Balkan War: the territory eventually gained was relatively circumscribed; Bulgaria had failed to gain Macedonia, which was Sofia's avowed purpose in entering the war, and especially the districts of Ohrid and Bitola, which had been a main demand. With only a small outlet to the Aegean around the minor port of Dedeagach, the country had to abandon its project of Balkan hegemony.

According to Anderson and Hershey, Greece, though a winner and triumphant after the acquisition of Thessaloniki and most of Macedonia up to and including the port of Kavala, still had outstanding issues. Italy was opposed to Greek claims to Northern Epirus, and controlled the Greek-inhabited Dodecanese islands. In addition, the status quo of the islands of the Northeastern Aegean, which Greece had taken from the Ottomans, remained undetermined until February 1914, when the Great Powers recognized Greek sovereignty over them. Tensions with the Ottomans remained high, however, in the face of persecutions of Anatolian Greeks, leading to a crisis and a naval race in summer 1914 that was stopped only by the outbreak of World War I. At the end of the war, Greece still had claims to territories inhabited, at the time, by some 3 million Greeks.

== Rise of Romania as a regional power ==
Borders after the Treaty of Bucharest in 1913

Following the Second Balkan War, in which Romania's intervention proved decisive, and the subsequent 1913 Treaty of Bucharest, Romania's dominant position in Southeastern Europe was confirmed. Romania also gained Southern Dobruja from Bulgaria. Romania also raised the question of the Balkan Vlachs (that is, the Aromanians and Megleno-Romanians), whom it considered its compatriots. Too distant to be annexed, however, Romania took Southern Dobruja as compensation. Romania was the strongest nation in the Balkans, and thus it believed that it had to acquire territory, given that its neighbors were being aggrandized. Romania's argument that it had turned the scales of the war was accepted without serious objections, due in part to Bulgaria's attitude not attracting much compassion. Despite not annexing the areas inhabited by Balkan Vlachs, Romania nevertheless obtained protection of the schools and churches of the Vlachs in the other Balkan states. Thus, Romania was the only Balkan country to obtain guarantees from all three of its neighbors, which pledged to recognize its interest in, and respect the autonomy of the Balkan Vlachs.

The status of the Vlachs in Bulgarian territories was settled on 4 August, in Greek territories on 5 August and in Serbian territories between 5 and 7 August. The 1913 Treaty of Bucharest itself was signed on 10 August. One notable aspect of this treaty was the lack of any real involvement from the European Great Powers. The Balkan states hurried to settle their differences before the Great Powers could again intervene in their affairs. That's not to say, however, that the treaty went unnoticed, but the reactions among the Great Powers were mixed: there were rumblings from the capitals of Germany, Austria-Hungary and Russia, while the British and the French rejoiced in the "coming of age" of the Balkan states. The Great Powers did not revise the treaty. Overall, the six Powers of the Concert of Europe had proved themselves to be rather helpless in Balkan crises. They had been unable to prevent the wars and subsequently could not ignore their results. The idea of revising the 1913 Treaty of Bucharest had to be abandoned.

Subsequently, in 1914, Romania managed to impose its candidate for the throne of the Principality of Albania and support his reign by deploying military forces up to a battalion in strength. Romania's brief stint as a significant power thus started with the 1913 Treaty of Bucharest, but ended in October 1916. Having joined the First World War on the side of the Allies on 27 August 1916, Romania launched an invasion of Transylvania. However, by 16 October, Transylvania had been cleared of Romanian troops. One week later, on 23 October, Romania's chief seaport was captured by the Central Powers.

== Sources ==
- Report of the International Commission to Inquire into the Causes and Conduct of the Balkan Wars. Washington, D.C.: Carnegie Endowment for International Peace. 1914 – via Internet Archive.
- Anderson, Frank Maloy; Hershey, Amos Shartle (1918). "The Treaty of Bucharest, August 10, 1913". Handbook for the Diplomatic History of Europe, Asia, and Africa 1870–1914. Washington, DC: National Board for Historical Service, Government Printing Office. pp. 439–441.
- "Treaty of Peace Between Bulgaria and Roumania, Greece, Monte-Negro and Servia, Signed at Bukharest July 28/August 10, 1913; ratification exchanged August 30, 1913 (Translation)". The American Journal of International Law. VIII (1, Supplement, Official Documents): 13–27. January 1914. doi:10.2307/2212403. JSTOR 2212403.
- Miller, William (1923). "The Balkan League and its Results". The Ottoman Empire and its Successors, 1801–1922 (2nd ed.). Cambridge: At the University Press. p. 516 – via Internet Archive.
