= Eustațiu Sebastian =

Romanian admiral

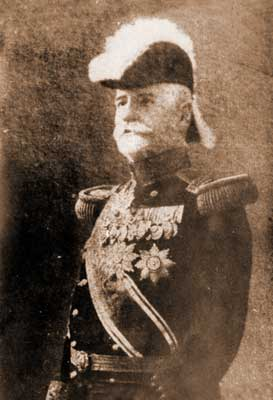
- Born: 1856; Bucharest, Wallachia
- Died: 1943 (aged 86–87)
- Military career
- Allegiance: United Principalities; Kingdom of Romania
- Branch: Romanian Land Forces (Kingdom of Romania) Romanian Navy
- Service years: 1872–1917
- Rank: Contraamiral
- Conflicts: Russo-Turkish War; Second Balkan War; Romanian landings in Bulgaria; World War I

Eustațiu Sebastian (1856–1943) was a Romanian admiral, who served as commander of the Royal Romanian Navy from 1909 until 1917.

== Biography ==
Born in Bucharest, Sebastian enrolled in 1872 at the School of Sons of Soldiers in Iași and then, in 1875, at the School of Officers in Bucharest, which he graduated in June 1877 with the rank of lieutenant. His father was Gheorghe Eustațiu.

In the Russo-Turkish War of 1877–1878 he fought as an officer in the 4th Line Regiment at Grivița and Smârdan, where he distinguished himself in combat. After the end of the war, the infantryman Eustațiu Sebastian was assigned to the Fleet Corps, being promoted in 1881 to the rank of lieutenant.

He was then sent to France to attend the Naval School in Brest. There he was embarked on the French ship "La Loire" with which he circled the earth, between 1884 and 1885. After returning to Romania, he was promoted in 1886 to the rank of captain. Starting with the annual 1886 and until 30 April 1888, Sebastian was at the command of the gunboat Grivița. Starting with 1 May 1888, Sebastian commanding the Bricul-school Mircea, on board which he faced in May 1888 a terrible storm in the Black Sea, which the Romanian sailboat managed to survive.

In 1893, he was promoted to the rank of major and received for the second time, the command of the ship Mircea in 1894. In 1898, he was in command of the cruiser Elisabeta, when he was appointed ad-interim commander of the Sea Division. In the same year he was promoted to the rank of captain-commander, being appointed Chief of Staff at the Navy Command. Between 1901 and 1903, Captain-Commander Eustațiu Sebastian held the command of the Sea Division, and between 1904 and 1907 he served as director of the Navy Arsenal, having the rank of commander.

On 15 April 1907, Commander Sebastian was appointed commander of the Danube Division. Then, on 1 April 1909, he was appointed Commander of the Navy, where he replaced Rear Admiral Emanoil Koslinski. He was promoted to the rank of Counter Admiral on 7 April 1909, in the following years he also held the position of Senior Director in the Ministry of War, from 1 April 1910, as well as that of Inspector General of the Navy, from 1 April 1911.

Rear Admiral Sebastian was in command of the Romanian Navy both during the Second Balkan War of 1913 and in the first part of the First World War. When Romania entered the war on the side of the Allies, Sebastian gave the order to the Romanian Navy to commence hostilities: "Sailors, we are at war with Austria-Hungary. Let's keep our eyes open and our arm ready to strike everything that will stand in our way, for the disenslavement of our brothers." He served in this capacity until 9 January 1917, when he was replaced by Rear Admiral Constantin Bălescu. In August 1917, he resigned as senior director of the Navy, joining the army reserve.

Currently, Corvette 264 of the Romanian Naval Fleet bears the name Rear Admiral Eustațiu Sebastian.

== Bibliography ==
- Romanian Naval Forces, Commanders of the Romanian Navy
- Jurnalul Național, August 30, 2004 – "The Aristocratic Wolves" (collector's edition)
