= Treaty of Athens =

1913 treaty between the Ottoman Empire and Greece

The Treaty of Athens between the Ottoman Empire and the Kingdom of Greece, signed on 14 November 1913, formally ended hostilities between them after the two Balkan Wars and ceded Macedonia—including the major city of Thessaloniki— most of Epirus, and many Aegean islands to Greece.

== Background ==
In the First Balkan War, the coalition of Bulgaria, Serbia, Greece and Montenegro defeated the Ottoman Empire. The Ottomans lost nearly all their European possessions, which were reduced to a small amount of territory around the Sea of Marmara by the Treaty of London. The Ottomans however were able to recover Eastern Thrace, during the Second Balkan War, when Bulgaria attacked her former allies and was defeated by the combined forces of all her neighbours including Romania.

During the First Balkan War, fighting against the Ottomans, Greece had occupied most of Epirus, southern Macedonia with the great port city of Thessaloniki and most of the islands of the Aegean Sea (except the Italian-occupied Dodecanese). In the second war, it expanded its territory in Macedonia further at the expense of Bulgaria. Since Western Thrace remained under Bulgarian control (it would be ceded to Greece in the 1919 Treaty of Neuilly), Greece shared no land border with Ottoman Empire. Greco-Turkish tensions however remained high, since the Ottoman government refused to accept Greek control over the islands of the northeastern Aegean.

== Terms ==
The terms of the treaty were as follows:

1. The Ottoman Empire acknowledged the Greek gains of Thessaloniki, Ioannina and their surrounding territory.
2. The Ottoman Empire acknowledged Greek sovereignty on the island of Crete, which had been an autonomous state under Ottoman suzerainty after 1897.
3. Minority rights were granted to the Turks living in the newly conquered Greek territory.

The most important issue that remained unresolved was the fate of the North Aegean islands (Lesbos, Chios, Lemnos, Imbros and Tenedos), which were annexed by Greece during the war. The issue was left to the arbitration of the Great Powers, who in February 1914 awarded them, except for Imbros and Tenedos, to Greece. As the Ottoman Empire refused to give up its claims, a crisis erupted which led to a naval race during 1913–1914 and preparations were made for a renewed conflict on both sides. The situation was only defused by the outbreak of World War I.
