= Siege of Vidin (1913) =

Battle during the Second Balkan War

Coordinates: 44°00′N 22°51′E

- Part of the Second Balkan War
Date	12–18 July 1913
Location	Vidin, Bulgaria
Result	Bulgarian victory: Initial Serb offensive repulsed; Treaty signed before further attacks could continue

Belligerents
Kingdom of Bulgaria	Kingdom of Serbia

Commanders and leaders
Krastyu Marinov	Vukoman Aračić

Strength
4,200 men 52 cannons	8,500

Casualties and losses
84 killed and wounded	Unknown

The siege of Vidin was an attempt by the Serbian Army to seize the Bulgarian city of Vidin during the Second Balkan War. The siege took place between 12 and 18 July 1913.

== Background ==
At the war's start, the Bulgarian First Army was situated in north-western Bulgaria. Its advance into Serbian territory was successful between 22 and 25 June, but Romania's unexpected intervention in the war and the Bulgarian Army's retreat from the front against Greece forced the Bulgarian chief of staff to transfer most of the country's troops into the region of Macedonia. During the retreat via the city of Ferdinand (now Montana), a large part of the 9th infantry division mutinied and surrendered to the Romanians on 5 July. Consequently, only a small, mostly militia force remained to face the Serbian counteroffensive in the areas of Belogradchik and Vidin.

On 8 July, the garrison of Belogradchik was overrun by the advancing Serbs of the Timok group and a small portion of Bulgarian soldiers who had survived the Serb onslaught retreated to Vidin. The next day, the Serbs entered Belogradchik while their cavalry blocked the land connection to Vidin from the rest of Bulgaria. Near the village of Bela Rada, a bloody battle was fought between the Serbian advanced guard and a Bulgarian reconnaissance squad, which then had to retreat.

== Surrounding of Vidin by the Serbs ==
By 12 July, the Serbian Timok Army (between 16 and 21 battalions with 54 cannons, including howitzer batteries) surrounded Vidin from all directions. The city was defended by about 1,200 regular troops and 3,000 militia, armed with a total of 52 cannons (most of which were obsolete.) In general, the Bulgarians were poorly equipped and had little ammunition. On 14 July, the Serbs started to bombard the ramparts and the city itself. The Bulgarian commander, General Krastyu Marinov, refused to surrender twice. The relentless bombardment continued for three straight days, causing insignificant military casualties for the Bulgarian side.

== Assault on the fortress ==
In the late afternoon of 17 July, after a lengthy artillery bombardment, a Serbian infantry division attacked the western sector of Vidin, located between the villages of Novoseltsi and Smardan. Two Serbian attacks had been repulsed by the Bulgarians by that evening. On 18 July, the Serbs notified General Marinov of the armistice that had been signed on the same day in Bucharest. Afterwards, the Serbians retreated from the region.
