= Bulinovac =

Coordinates: 43°36′14″N 22°10′56″E

- Village
- Interactive map of Bulinovac
- Country: Serbia
- District: Zaječar District
- Municipality: Knjaževac

Population (2002)
  - Total: 194
- Time zone: UTC+1 (CET)
  - Summer (DST): UTC+2 (CEST)

Bulinovac is a village in the municipality of Knjaževac, Serbia. According to the 2002 census, the village has a population of 194 people.
