= Second Balkan War =

Bulgaria's invasion of its neighbours (1913)

- Part of the Balkan Wars
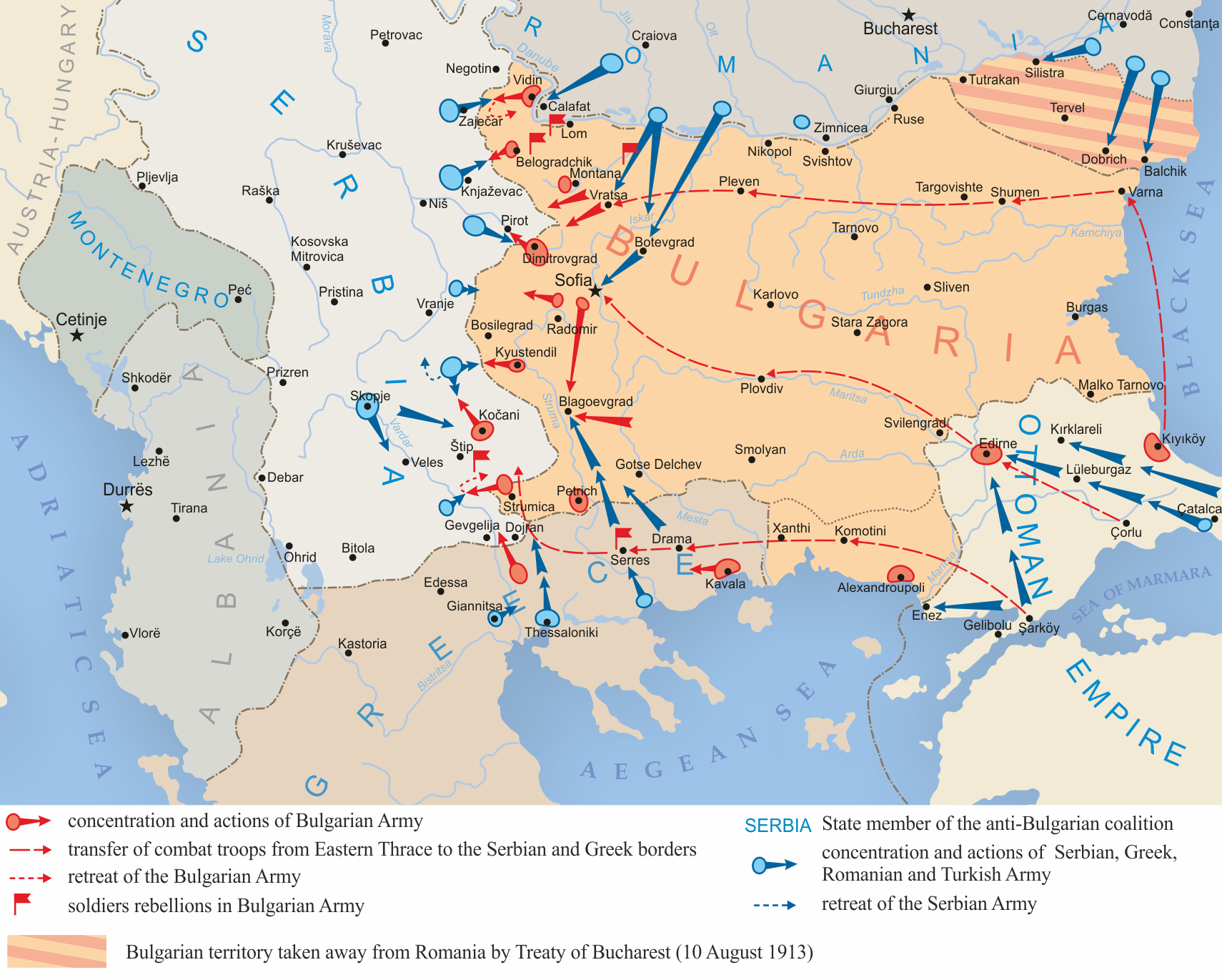
- Map of the mainland operations of the Allied belligerents (amphibious actions not shown)
Date	29 June – 10 August 1913 (N.S.) (16 June – 28 July 1913 O.S.); (1 month, 1 week and 5 days)
Location	Balkan Peninsula
Result	Bulgarian defeat
Territorial changes	Treaty of Bucharest; Treaty of Constantinople; Bulgaria ceded; East Thrace to the Ottoman Empire; Southern Dobruja to Romania; Most of Vardar Macedonia to Serbia; Parts of Eastern Macedonia to Greece

Belligerents
Bulgaria	Serbia; Greece; Romania; Montenegro; Ottoman Empire

Commanders and leaders
(Tsardom of Bulgaria (1908–1946)) Ferdinand I; (Tsardom of Bulgaria (1908–1946)) Mihail Savov; (Tsardom of Bulgaria (1908–1946)) Vasil Kutinchev; (Tsardom of Bulgaria (1908–1946)) Nikola Ivanov; (Tsardom of Bulgaria (1908–1946)) Radko Dimitriev; (Tsardom of Bulgaria (1908–1946)) Stiliyan Kovachev; (Tsardom of Bulgaria (1908–1946)) Stefan Toshev; (Tsardom of Bulgaria (1908–1946)) Racho Petrov; (Tsardom of Bulgaria (1908–1946)) Vicho Dikov	(Kingdom of Serbia) Peter I; (Kingdom of Serbia) Radomir Putnik; (Kingdom of Serbia) Stepa Stepanović; (Kingdom of Serbia) Petar Bojović; (Kingdom of Greece) Constantine I; (Kingdom of Greece) Leonidas Paraskevopoulos; (Kingdom of Greece) Emmanouil Manousogiannakis; (Kingdom of Greece) Konstantinos Moschopoulos; (Kingdom of Montenegro) Nicholas I; (Kingdom of Montenegro) Prince Danilo; (Kingdom of Montenegro) Janko Vukotić; (Kingdom of Romania) Carol I; (Kingdom of Romania) Prince Ferdinand; (Kingdom of Romania) Ioan Culcer; (Ottoman Empire) Mehmed V; (Ottoman Empire) Enver Pasha; (Ottoman Empire) Ahmed Izzet Pasha; (Ottoman Empire) Çürüksulu Mahmud Pasha

Strength
(Tsardom of Bulgaria (1908–1946)) 500,491	(Kingdom of Serbia) 348,000; (Kingdom of Greece) 117,861; (Kingdom of Montenegro) 12,802; (Kingdom of Romania) 417,720 (no combat); (Ottoman Empire) 200,000–250,000 (no combat)

Casualties and losses
Kingdom of Bulgaria: 93,000: 18,000 killed; 60,000 wounded; 15,000 dead from disease	Serbia: 50,000: 9,000 killed; 36,000 wounded; 5,000 dead of disease; Greece: 22,058; 2,563 killed in action; 19,307 wounded in action or sick; 188 missing in action; Montenegro: 1,201; 240 killed; 961 wounded; Romania: 1,600; no combat casualties; 1,600 dead of a cholera outbreak; Ottoman Empire: 4,000; no combat casualties; 4,000 dead of disease

The Second Balkan War (29 June (Note: 16 (O.S.) / 29 (N.S.) June 1913.) – 10 August 1913) was a conflict fought between the Tsardom of Bulgaria and its former Balkan League allies, Serbia, Montenegro and Greece, who were later joined by Romania and the Ottoman Empire.

The war began when Bulgaria, unhappy with the division of territory in Macedonia after the First Balkan War, launched attacks on Serbian and Greek forces, who repelled the offensive and pushed into Bulgarian territory. With most of Bulgaria's army committed in the south, Romania intervened from the north. The Ottoman Empire also took advantage of the situation to recover territories lost the previous year.

As Bulgaria suffered military setbacks on multiple fronts and Romanian forces advanced towards its capital, Sofia, it requested an armistice. The war ended with the Treaty of Bucharest, which compelled Bulgaria to cede significant territory: Southern Dobruja to Romania, parts of Macedonia to Serbia and Greece, and Adrianople (Edirne) to the Ottoman Empire under the separate Treaty of Constantinople.

The war altered the political balance in the Balkans and intensified regional tensions. Serbia expanded its territory and influence, heightening its rivalry with Austria-Hungary. Bulgaria, weakened by defeat and territorial losses, would later align with the Central Powers in the First World War.

== Background ==
During the First Balkan War, which began in October 1912, the Balkan League (Bulgaria, Serbia, Montenegro and Greece) succeeded in driving out the Ottoman Empire from its European provinces (Albania, Kosovo, Macedonia, Sandžak and Thrace), leaving the Ottomans with only East Thrace. The Treaty of London, signed on 30 May 1913, which ended the war, acknowledged the Balkan states' gains west of the Enos–Midia line, drawn from Midia (Kıyıköy) on the Black Sea coast to Enos (Enez) on the Aegean Sea coast, on an uti possidetis basis, and created an independent Albania.

However, the relations between the victorious Balkan allies quickly soured over the division of the land, specifically in Macedonia. During the pre-war negotiations that resulted in the Balkan League's establishment, a secret agreement on 13 March 1912 was signed by Serbia and Bulgaria, which determined their future boundaries, effectively sharing northern Macedonia. In case of a post-war disagreement, the area to the north of the Kriva Palanka–Ohrid line (with both cities going to Bulgaria) had been designated as a "disputed zone" under Russian arbitration, with the area to the south of this line assigned to Bulgaria. During the war, the Serbian army succeeded in capturing lands in Macedonia, which were promised to Bulgaria according to the March 1912 treaty, and started to harass the Bulgarian population in the region. At the same time, the Greek army advanced north, occupying Thessaloniki shortly before the Bulgarian army had arrived, and established a common Greek border with Serbia.

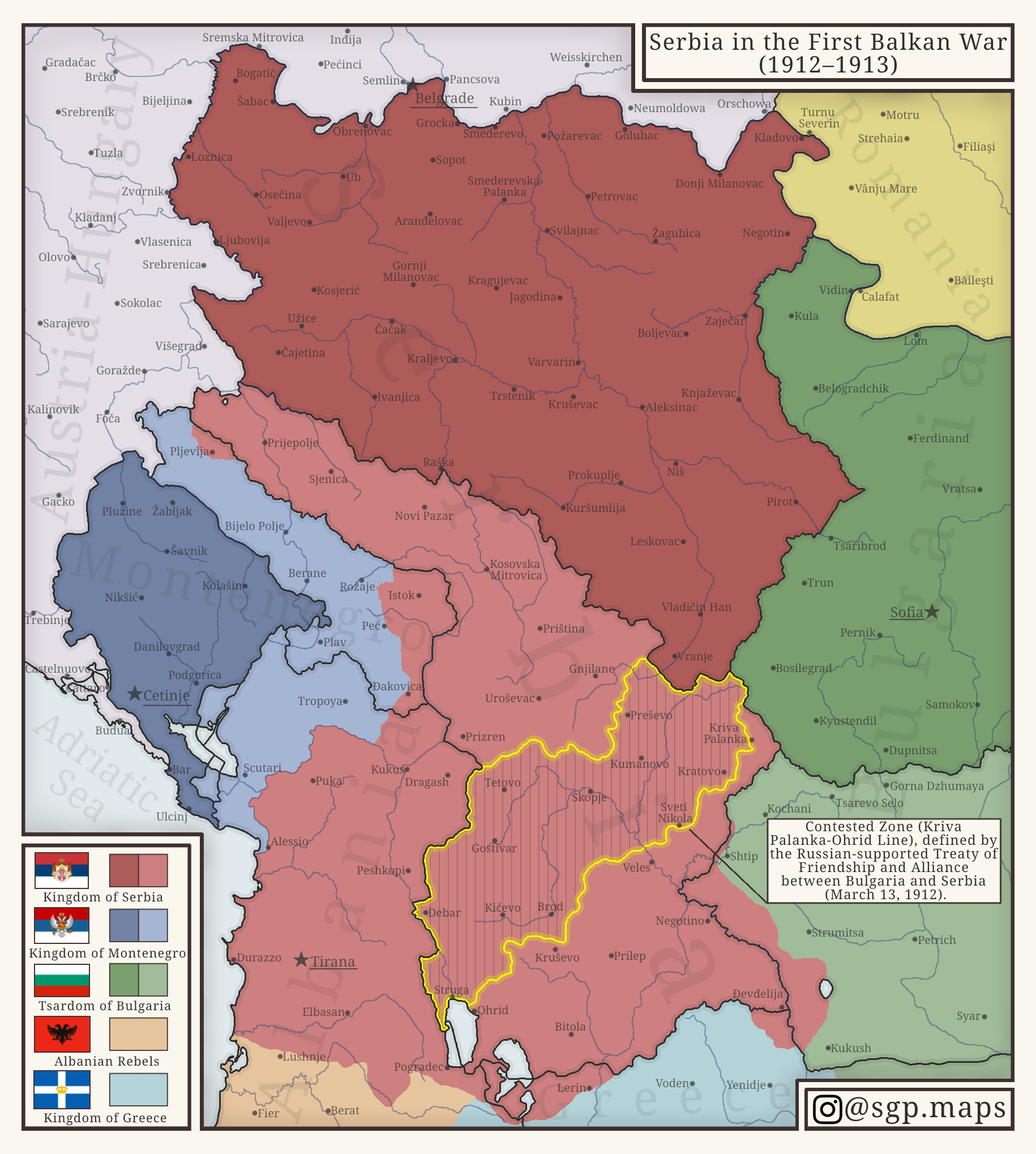
Occupied lands by Serbia after the First Balkan War, including the disputed area with Bulgaria, shown with yellow borders.

When Bulgaria called upon Serbia to honour the pre-war agreement over northern Macedonia, the Serbian side, displeased at the Great Powers' requiring them to give up their gains in north Albania, adamantly refused to evacuate any more territory. These developments ended the Serbian–Bulgarian alliance and made future war inevitable. Soon, Bulgarian troops started minor clashes along the borders of the occupation zones of Serbia and Greece, due to which the two started alliance negotiations, perceiving Bulgaria as a threat.

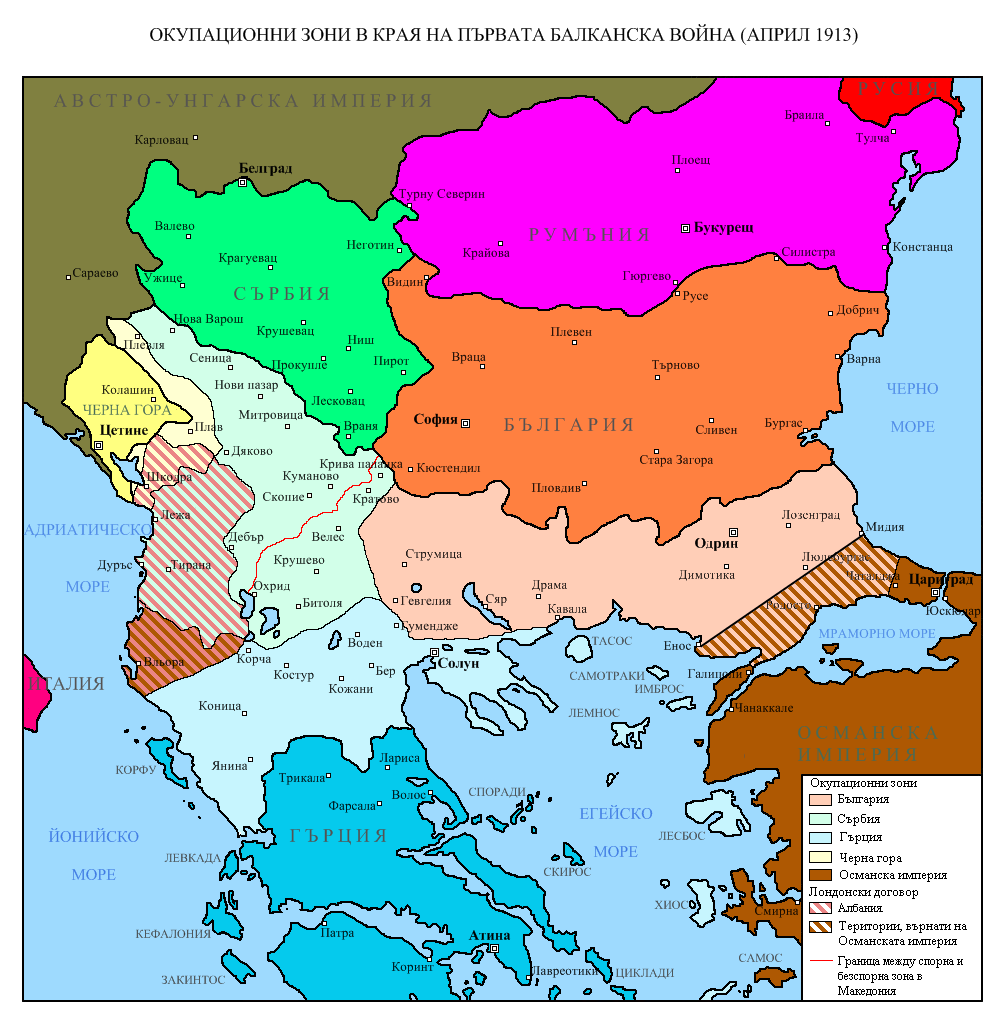
The territorial gains of the Balkan states after the First Balkan War and the line of expansion according to the pre-war secret agreement between Serbia and Bulgaria

On 19 May/1 June 1913, two days after the signing of the Treaty of London and just 28 days before the Bulgarian attack, Greece and Serbia signed a secret defensive alliance, confirming the current demarcation line between the two occupation zones as their mutual border, promising that neither side would make a separate settlement with Bulgaria and concluding an alliance in case of an attack. With this agreement, Serbia succeeded in making Greece a part of its dispute over northern Macedonia, since Greece had guaranteed Serbia's current (and disputed) occupation zone in Macedonia. In an attempt to halt the Serbo-Greek rapprochement, Bulgarian Prime Minister Geshov signed a protocol with Greece on 21 May, agreeing on a permanent boundary between their respective forces, effectively accepting Greek control over southern Macedonia. However, his later dismissal ended the diplomatic targeting of Serbia.

Another point of friction arose when Bulgaria refused cede the fortress of Silistra to Romania. When Romania demanded its cession after the First Balkan War, Bulgaria's foreign minister offered instead some minor border changes, which excluded Silistra, and assurances for the rights of the Aromanians in Macedonia. Romania threatened to occupy Bulgarian territory by force, but a Russian proposal for arbitration prevented hostilities. In the resulting Protocol of St. Petersburg of 9 May 1913, Bulgaria agreed to give up Silistra. The resulting agreement was a compromise between the Romanian demands for the city, two triangles at the Bulgaria–Romania border and Balchik and the land between it and Romania and the Bulgarian refusal to accept any cession of its territory. However, the fact that Russia failed to protect the territorial integrity of Bulgaria made the Bulgarians uncertain of the reliability of the expected Russian arbitration of the dispute with Serbia. The Bulgarian behaviour also had a long-term impact on Russo-Bulgarian relations. The uncompromising Bulgarian position to review the prewar agreement with Serbia during a second Russian initiative for arbitration finally led Russia to cancel its alliance with Bulgaria.

In 1912, Bulgaria's national aspirations, as expressed by Tsar Ferdinand and the military leadership, exceeded the provisions of the 1878 Treaty of San Stefano, considered even then as maximalistic, since it included both Eastern and Western Thrace and all Macedonia with Thessaloniki, Edirne and Constantinople. Early evidence of the lack of realistic thinking in Bulgarian leadership was that although Russia had sent clear warnings expressed for the first time on 5 November 1912 (well before the First Battle of Çatalca) that if the Bulgarian army occupied Constantinople they would attack it, they continued their attempts to take the city.

By mid-June, Bulgaria became aware of the Serbian–Greek agreement. On 27 June, Montenegro announced that it would side with Serbia in the event of a Serbian–Bulgarian war. On 5 February 1913, Romania had settled her differences over Transylvania with Austria-Hungary, signing a military alliance, and on 28 June, officially warned Bulgaria that it would not remain neutral in a new Balkan war. As skirmishing continued in Macedonia, mainly between Serbian and Bulgarian troops, Tsar Nicholas II of Russia tried to stop the conflict since Russia did not wish to lose either of its Slavic allies in the Balkans. On 8 June, he sent an identical personal message to the Kings of Bulgaria and Serbia, offering to act as arbitrator according to the provisions of the 1912 Serbo–Bulgarian treaty. Serbia was asking for a revision of the original treaty since it had already lost north Albania due to the Great Powers' decision to establish the state of Albania, which had been recognized as Serbian territory under the prewar Serbo–Bulgarian treaty, in exchange for Bulgarian expansion in northern Macedonia. The Bulgarian reply to the Russian invitation contained so many conditions that it amounted to an ultimatum, leading Russian diplomats to realize that Bulgaria had already decided to go to war. That caused Russia to cancel the arbitration initiative and angrily repudiate its 1902 treaty of alliance with Bulgaria. Russia's Foreign Minister Sazonov's exact words to Bulgaria's new Prime Minister Stoyan Danev were "Do not expect anything from us, and forget the existence of any of our agreements from 1902 until the present". Bulgaria was shattering the Balkan League, Russia's best defence against Austro-Hungarian expansionism, a structure that had cost Russia much blood, money and diplomatic capital during the previous 35 years. Then Serbia and Greece proposed that each of the three countries reduce its army by one-fourth as a first step to facilitate a peaceful solution, but Bulgaria rejected it.

== Preparation ==
=== Bulgarian war plans ===
Assistant Commander-in-Chief General Mihail Savov, with the help of Colonel Stefan Nerezov, drafted on 31 May plans for an eventual war with both Serbia and Greece. According to the Savov-Nerezov Plan, the First Army under General Vasil Kutinchev was to advance toward Knjaževac and Zaječar in the Timok Valley, after which it was to march as fast as possible toward Pirot and Bela Palanka and join up with the Third Army. The Third Army under General Radko Dimitriev was tasked with tying down the Serbian forces near Pirot, leaving a covering force in the direction of Niš, and, after awaiting the arrival of the First Army, attacking and capturing Pirot. The two united armies were then expected to advance along the Morava valley toward Vranje and Kumanovo and there deliver a decisive blow against the main Serbian forces concentrated at Ovče Pole. The Cavalry Division was to operate on the right flank of the Third Army, linking it with the First Army. The Fifth Army, under General Stefan Toshev, was supposed to serve as the "axis of rotation" of the entire Bulgarian army, drawing as many enemy forces as possible into the sector Sultan Tepe–Kriva Palanka–Mount Kitka.

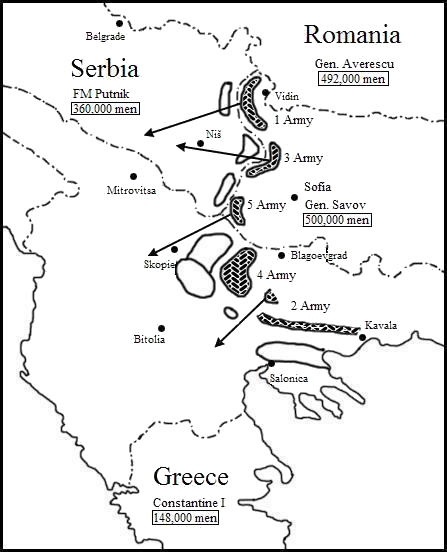
The initial plan of the Bulgarian Army (Savov-Nerezov)

The biggest Bulgarian Army, the Fourth, under General Stiliyan Kovachev, was to advance in the Štip–Zletovo sector and capture the Serbian forward positions, while its left wing had to drive the enemy behind the Vardar River. After establishing itself in the aforementioned positions, the Fourth Army was to force-march four brigades to the Second Army, under General Nikola Ivanov, to join the operations against the Greeks. After awaiting the appearance of the First and Third Armies, the bulk of the Fourth Army, still positioned in Vardar Macedonia, was to go on the offensive and join the combined operations of the First, Third, and Fifth Armies and decisively defeat the Serbian army.

The Second Army was required to advance with the 11th Division and fortify itself along the Aegean coast and the left bank of the Struma River. The right wing had to seize Gevgelija, while its centre, reinforced by the Serres Brigade and elements of the 11th Division, had to occupy favourable starting positions for a general advance toward Thessaloniki after the arrival of the four brigades from the Fourth Army. Savov's overall strategic concept was for a fast and decisive blow against the Serbian army, which he thought was the main military danger for the Bulgarian army, while the reinforced Second Army had to push the Greek army out of Thessaloniki. Savov relied on the speed of the action to take out Serbia and Greece before Romania and the Ottoman Empire could intervene, which he presumed would not dare to go to war against a victorious Bulgaria.

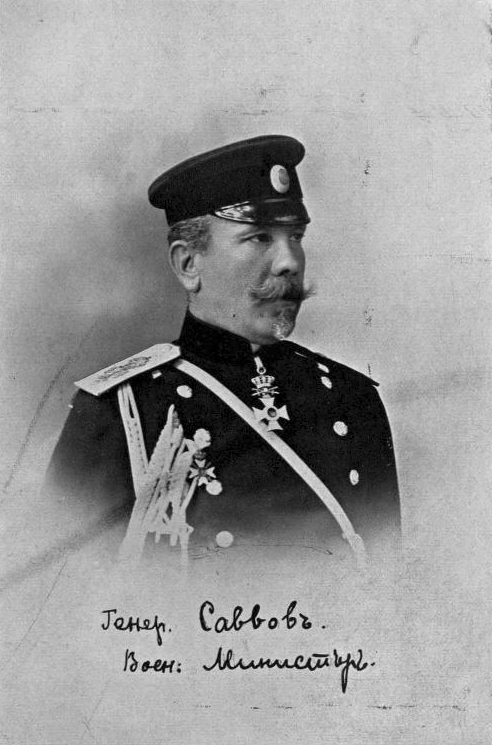
Mihail Savov

On the other hand, Chief of Staff of the Active Army, General Ivan Fichev, while opposing a new war, criticised Savov's plan for lacking a concentrated large force capable of delivering a decisive blow, underestimating the geographical obstacles that would arise during the flanking maneuver through the Morava valley and the doubtful ability of the Second Army to hold off the Greek army on such a wide front. Fichev instead argued for reinforcing the Bulgarian armies facing the Greeks and delivering a crushing blow there, while maintaining a defensive posture against the Serbs. Only after the Greek army had been put out of action could enough forces be sent against the Serbian army for a decisive confrontation there.

The Savov–Nerezov Plan, however, was never officially approved, which meant that virtually all commanders of the Bulgarian Army lacked a clear picture of the operational plan of the High Command and of what their respective armies were supposed to do in the event of a future war. A point of friction arose between the commander of the Second Army and Savov over clear directions, reinforcements and formations being understrength and overstretched on the Greek front, with Savov greatly underestimating the capabilities of the Greek army.

=== Greek–Serbian Alliance and war plans ===
After signing the Greek-Serbian alliance, military representatives of Serbia, Colonels P. Pešić and D. Tufegdžić, and of Greece, Captain K. Stratigos, drew up a military convention and an operational plan against Bulgaria in the event of a future war. The overall strategic objective was the destruction of Bulgarian military power and the enforcement of Serbian and Greek demands on Bulgaria. The Serbian-Greek plan envisioned three possible scenarios:

- The first was prepared in case the main Bulgarian army was concentrated in the direction of Serres–Salonika against the Greek army, in which case the main Serbian army was to advance toward Doiran–Kilkis or toward Serres.
- The second was prepared in case the main Bulgarian army was concentrated in the directions Sofia–Pirot–Niš or Sofia–Kyustendil–Skopje against the Serbs. In this case, the two allied armies were supposed to undertake an advance toward Sofia, with the Greek army operating through Kratovo–Kumanovo or along the valley of the Struma and through Dzhumaya.
- The third plan prepared for the eventuality of the Bulgarian forces being distributed evenly between the Serbian and Greek fronts. In this scenario, both armies had to first defeat the Bulgarians in front of their respective fronts and then come to one another’s assistance.

=== Opposing forces ===
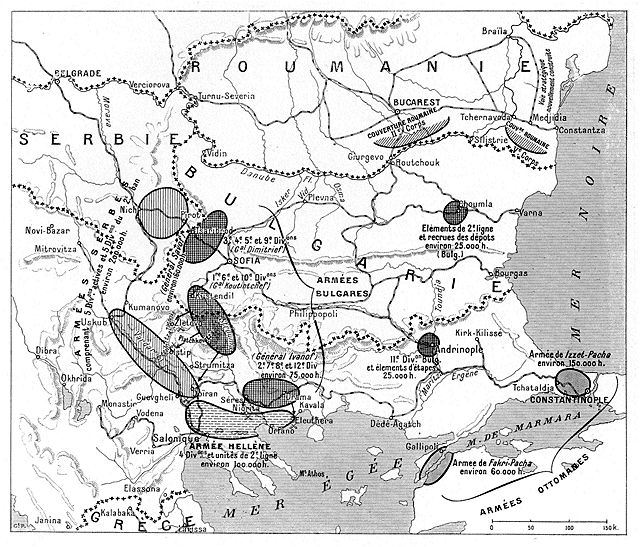
Concentrations of the forces of the Balkan states in June 1913

According to the Military Law of 1903, the armed forces of Bulgaria were divided into two categories: the Active Army and the National Militia. The core of the Armed forces consisted of nine infantry and one cavalry division. The Bulgarian army had an unique organization among those of Europe since each infantry division had three brigades of two regiments, composed of four battalions of six heavy companies of 250 men each, plus an independent battalion, two large artillery regiments and one cavalry regiment, giving a total of 25 heavy infantry battalions and 16 cavalry companies per division, which was more than the equivalent of two nine-battalion divisions, the standard divisional structure in most armies, as was also the case with the Greek and Serbian militaries in 1913. Consequently, although the Bulgarian army had 599,878 men mobilized at the beginning of the First Balkan War, there were only nine organizational divisions, giving a divisional strength closer to an Army Corps than to a Division. Tactical necessities during and after the First Balkan War modified this original structure: a new 10th division was formed using two brigades from the 1st and 6th divisions, and an additional three independent brigades were formed from recruits. Nevertheless, the heavy structure generally remained. By contrast, the Greek Army of Macedonia also had nine divisions, but the total number of men under arms was only 118,000. Another decisive factor affecting the real strength of the divisions between the opposing armies was the distribution of artillery. The nine-division-strong Greek Army had 176 guns, and the ten-division-strong Serbian army had 230. The Bulgarians had 1,116, a ratio of 6:1 against the Greeks and 5:1 against the Serbian army.

There is a dispute over the strength of the Bulgarian army during the Second Balkan War. At the outbreak of the First Balkan War, Bulgaria mobilized a total of 599,878 men (366,209 in the Active Army; 53,927 in the supplementing units; 53,983 in the National Militia; 94,526 from the 1912 and 1913 levies; 14,204 volunteers; 14,424 in the border guards). The non-recoverable casualties during the First Balkan War were 33,000 men (14,000 killed and 19,000 died of disease). To replace these casualties, Bulgaria conscripted 60,000 men between the two wars, mainly from the newly occupied areas, using 21,000 of them to form the Seres, Drama and Odrin (Edirne) independent brigades. It is known that there were no demobilized men. According to the Bulgarian command, the army had 7,693 officers and 492,528 soldiers in its ranks on 16 June (including the three brigades mentioned above). This gives a difference of 99,657 men in strength between the two wars. In comparison, subtracting the actual number of casualties, including wounded and adding the newly conscripted men produces no less than 576,878 men. The army was experiencing shortages of war materials and had only 378,998 rifles at its disposal.

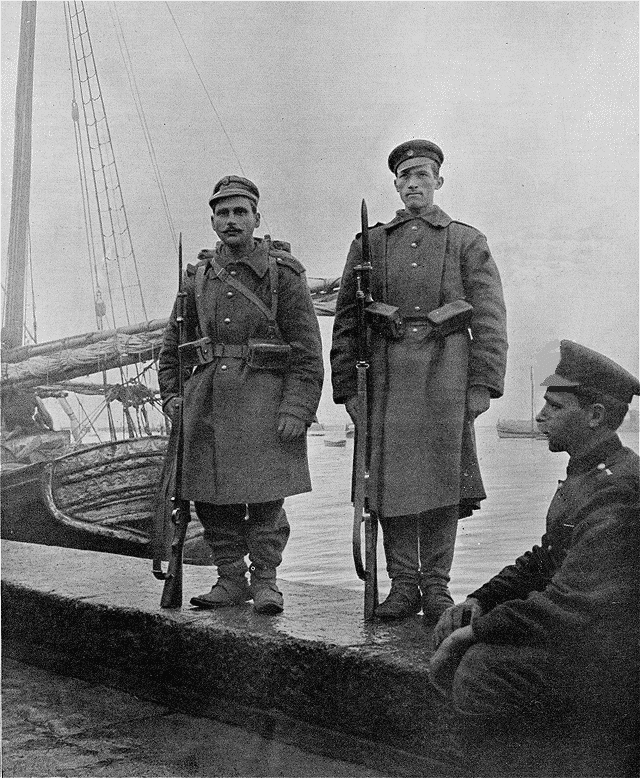
Photo of a Greek (left) and Bulgarian (right) sentry at the port of Thessaloniki during the period of joint occupation before the outbreak of the war.

The Bulgarian army was divided into five armies. The First Army, under General Vasil Kutinchev, was deployed along the northern part of the old border between Serbia and Bulgaria, from Vidin to Berkovitsa, and consisted of around 57,000 men. The neighbouring Third Army, under General Radko Dimitriev, numbered 43,000 men and was positioned west of Sofia. The Fifth Army, under General Stefan Toshev, was positioned around Kyustendil and Radomir and had 75,000 soldiers. The largest Bulgarian army was the Fourth Army, under General Stiliyan Kovachev, which numbered around 100,000 soldiers and had taken positions around Štip and Kočani opposite the main Serbian armies in Macedonia. The Second Army, under General Nikola Ivanov, was 75,000 strong and was positioned against the Greek army, stretching from Kavala to Lake Doiran.

The Royal Serbian Army, under the command of Vojvoda Radomir Putnik, accounted for 348,000 men, with 300,000 being deployed against the Bulgarians, and was divided into three field armies, while the rest were stationed in and around the unsettled border with Albania.The 1st Serbian Army, commanded by Crown Prince Alexander, stood northeast of Skopje. The Serbian 2nd Army, commanded by General Stepa Stepanovich, stood around Pirot.The 3rd Army, commanded by General Bozhidar Jankovich, was positioned around Veles. The Kingdom of Montenegro sent one division of 12,802 men under General Janko Vukotić to assist the Serbian army on the Macedonian front.

The Greek army, commanded by King Constantine, consisted of nine divisions plus a cavalry division totaling around 121,000 men facing the Bulgarian 2nd Army north of Thessaloniki. Two divisions were stationed in Epirus to enforce Greek claims to this region.

The Kingdom of Romania had the largest army in the Balkans, although it had not seen action since the Romanian War of Independence against the Ottomans in 1878. Its peacetime strength was 6,149 officers and 94,170 men, and it was well equipped by Balkan standards, possessing 126 field batteries, fifteen howitzer and three mountain batteries made primarily by Krupp. Upon mobilizing, the Romanian army mustered 417,720 men allocated to five army corps. Some 80,000 were assembled to occupy the Southern Dobruja, while an army of 250,000 was assembled to carry the main offensive into Bulgaria.

The political developments and military preparations for the Second Balkan War attracted an estimated 200–300 war correspondents from around the world.

== Start of the war ==
After the 10-day ultimatum made by General Savov to the government over whether the army would go to war or demobilise had expired, Tsar Ferdinand authorized General Savov to begin a limited military “demonstration”, whose aims were to raise Bulgarian morale, assist the government in its complicated political situation by pressuring Russia, which did not want another Balkan war, to accelerate arbitration and make Serbia and Greece more agreeable through military blows, and seize disputed territory before intervention by the Great Powers. While the Savov–Nerezov plan had all five Bulgarian armies advance along the entire front, the military demonstration was restricted only to the undisputed zone and previously Bulgarian-occupied lands (during the First Balkan War) and involved only the Second and Fourth Armies, which were to push out the Serbian and Greek forces from said areas. The Bulgarian headquarters did not intend the operation to develop into an actual war.

The commander of the Fourth Army was instructed to energetically attack the Serbs on its entire front and secure several tactical positions, but also not to reveal all his forces or get involved in prolonged fights. The Fourth Army also had to capture Udovo station and separate the Serbian-Montenegrin army from the Greek army and produce feelings of shock in the Serbian camp. General Kovachev, however, lacked information about the wider strategic idea behind this operation. General Ivanov was likewise not told of the overall strategic idea behind his orders from Savov. The Second Army was to energetically attack around Leftera and Chayaz and cement itself there. Notably, the Second Army was to advance only with its flanks, while the rest of the formations remained on the defense. The role of the Second Army was to be subordinate to the larger Fourth Army and to support the division of the Serbian and Greek armies.

The fighting began on the night of 29–30 June. The Bulgarian Fourth Army advanced against the well-prepared positions of the Serbian First and Third Armies, which were not surprised by the Bulgarian attack. The Bulgarians initially advanced on both flanks and crossed the Zletovska River, capturing several tactical positions and, with the capture of Udovo station and Gevgelija, severing communications between the Serbian and Greek armies. The Bulgarian Second Army also pushed Greek forward units from the left bank of the Struma River, while the Greek command began concentrating forces toward Kilkis and Gevgelija, threatening the Second Army's right flank.

Prime Minister Stoyan Danev, upon learning of the fighting taking place in Macedonia, was alarmed and insisted that the government had not authorized any attacks and had peaceful intentions. He continued to hope that Russian arbitration could still prevent a wider conflict and appealed to Belgrade and Athens to cease hostilities. On 1 July, the Council of Ministers ordered Bulgarian operations to stop. Savov, on the orders of the government, ordered the Fourth Army to stop, while Ferdinand pressed for the attack to continue, showcasing the divide between the army, monarch, and government. Serbia and Greece, however, did not respond to Danev's attempts to halt the crisis and regarded the Bulgarian attacks as an opportunity to present themselves as victims of Bulgarian aggression. The pause in Bulgarian operations also allowed the Serbs and Greeks to recover from the initial blows, and they did not stop fighting, despite efforts by Bulgarian officers under flags of truce to explain to them that the fighting was a mistake. The order to stop surprised Bulgarian soldiers and had a confusing and even paralyzing effect on Bulgarian forces, some of which had achieved favourable positions. By 1 July, Vojvoda Radomir Putnik had ordered the Serbian Third Army to hold and counterattack, and Serbian forces launched a powerful counteroffensive that pushed the Bulgarian Fourth Army back toward its starting positions.

== Serbian front ==
The 4th Bulgarian army held the most important position in the attempted conquest of Serbian Macedonia. The fighting began on 29–30 June 1913, between the 4th Bulgarian army and the 1st and 3rd Serbian armies, first along the Zletovska and then after a Bulgarian retreat, along the Bregalnica river. Internal confusion led to heavy Bulgarian losses in 1–3 July. By 8 July, the Bulgarian army had been severely defeated.

In the north, on 7 July, the Bulgarian 3rd Army moved forward in two groups toward the town of Pirot and ultimately to Niš in order to cut the railroad line between that city and Skopje. This advance toward Pirot succeeded in threatening the city. Vojvoda Putnik was forced to withdraw two divisions from Macedonia and send them north. The Bulgarian 3rd Army continued to attack toward Pirot until 23 July, after which it assumed strong defensive positions which protected the capital Sofia from Serbian attacks for the remainder of the war. Further north, the Bulgarian 1st Army began its offensive on 4 July and took the Serbian town of Knjaževac on 7 July and prepared to move on toward Pirot. The next day, however, the Bulgarian high command ordered a retreat to the Bulgarian frontier. The new Assistant Commander-in-Chief, General Radko Dimitriev, ordered the First Army to withdraw and redeploy southward in order to halt the Greek advance. This decision cost the Bulgarians the strategic initiative in the Morava region. The Romanian Danube Army crossed the Danube at Gigen on 15 July and occupied Pleven and Montana. Later, at Belogradchik, they linked up with Serbian forces which, after the withdrawal of the First Army, went into Bulgarian territory. By 20 July, all of northwestern Bulgaria was under Serbian-Romanian control, with the exception of Vidin, which was besieged.

Bulgarian soldiers at the Battle of Kalimanci

On 13 July 1913, General Mihail Savov assumed control of the 4th and 5th Bulgarian armies. The Bulgarians dug into strong positions around the village of Kalimantsi at the Bregalnica river in northeastern Macedonia. On July 17, Serbian troops advanced against Bulgarian forward units, which withdrew to higher positions. 18 July was one of the bloodiest days in the battle beginning with Bulgarian night attacks and Serbian-Montenegrin counterattacks. By the evening, the 4th Army repelled all Serbian-Montenegrin assaults. General Savov then ordered the 5th Army to advance toward Sultan Tepe. The 5th Army advanced and drove away the Serbian forces, restoring some positions previously lost. On 19 July, the Serbian-Montenegrin force began another wave of attacks against Bulgarian positions. Bulgarian troops counterattacked and seized several important heights, but the advance of the 4th Army's right wing was threathened by the Greek advance further south against its left wing. During the night, Serbian forces again attempted to capture Bulgarian positions but were repulsed. The defensive victory, along with the successes to the north of the 1st and 3rd armies, protected western Bulgaria from a Serbian invasion. Although this boosted the Bulgarians, the situation was critical in the south, with the Greek Army. After repelling the Serbian attacks, the 5th Bulgarian army, on the orders of General Savov, sent reinforcements to assist the operations of the 4th Army against the Greeks.

== Greek front ==
The 75,000-strong Bulgarian Second Army in southern Macedonia consisted of the 3rd and 11th Divisions at incomplete strength, one brigade of the 10th Division, the insufficiently trained Serres and Drama Brigades, and the 10th Cavalry Regiment. Commanded by General Ivanov, it held a line from Lake Doiran to Kavala and the Aegean Sea and had been in position since May. The Greek General Staff overestimated the strength of the Bulgarian forces, estimating them at between 80,000 and 105,000 men.

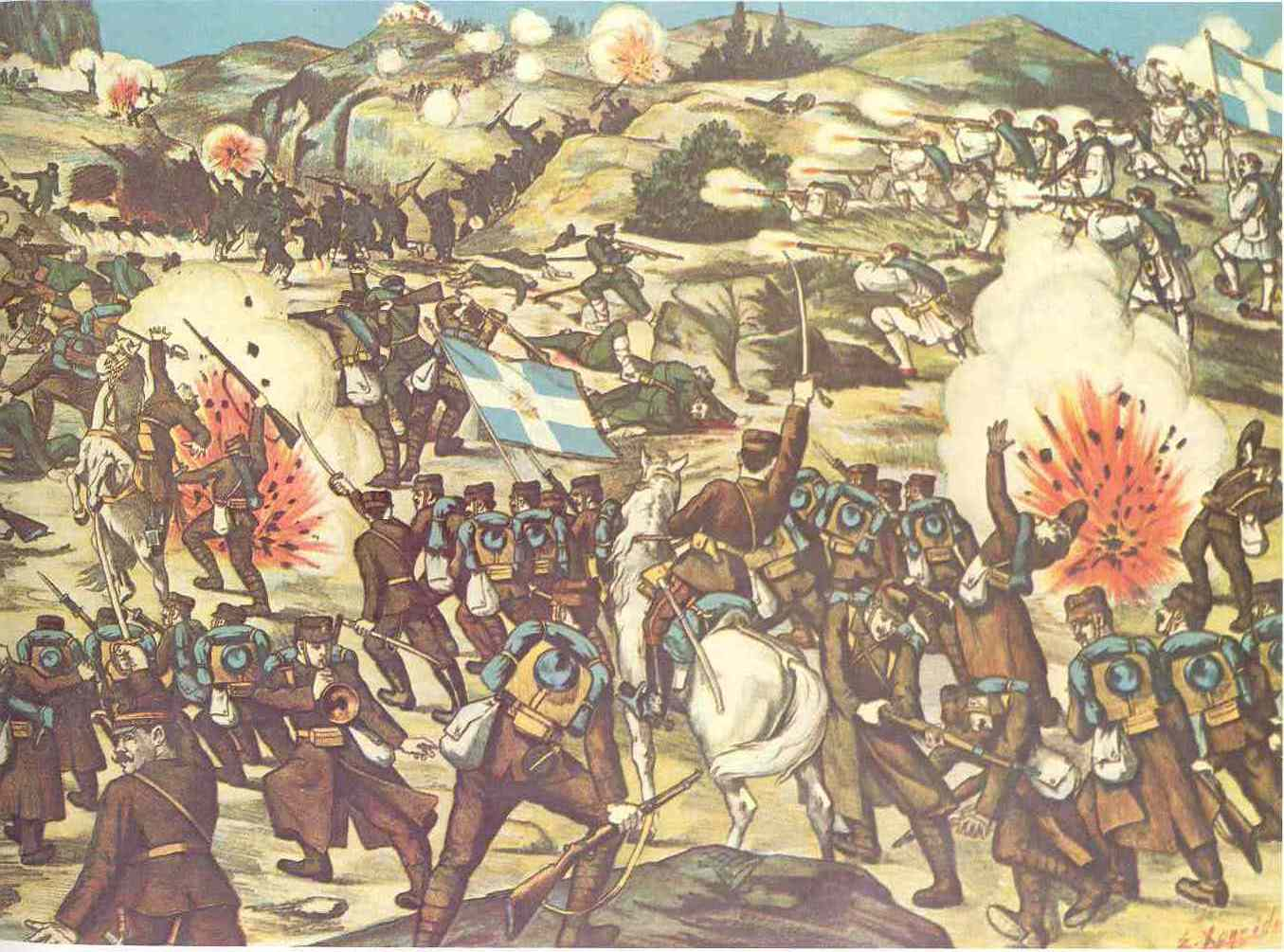
Greek lithograph of the battle of Lachanas

The Greek army, commanded by King Constantine I, had eight divisions and a cavalry brigade (117,861 men) with 176 artillery guns in a line extending from the Gulf of Orphanos to the Gevgelija area. Since the Greek headquarters did not know where the Bulgarian attack would occur, the Bulgarians would have temporary local superiority in the location chosen for the attack.

On 26 June, the Bulgarian army received orders to destroy the opposing Greek forces and to advance towards Thessaloniki. The Greeks stopped them, and by 29 June, an order for a general counterattack was issued. At Kilkis, the Bulgarians had constructed strong defences, including captured Ottoman guns which dominated the plain below. The Greek 4th, 2nd, and 5th divisions attacked across the plain in rushes supported by artillery. The Greek Army suffered heavy casualties but carried the trenches by the next day. On the Bulgarian left, the Greek 7th Division captured Serres and the 1st and 6th divisions captured Lachanas. The defeat of the 2nd army by the Greeks was the most serious military disaster suffered by the Bulgarians in the Second Balkan War. Bulgarian sources give 6,971 casualties, over 6,000 prisoners, and over 130 artillery pieces captured by the Greeks, who suffered 8,700 casualties. On 28 June, the retreating Bulgarian army and irregulars burned down the major city of Serres (a predominantly Greek town surrounded by both Bulgarian – to the north and west – and Greek – to the east and south – villages), and the towns of Nigrita, Doxato and Demir Hisar, ostensibly as a retaliation for the burning of the Bulgarian town of Kilkis by the Greeks, which had taken place after the named battle, as well as the destruction of multiple Bulgarian villages in the region. On the Bulgarian right, Greek Evzones captured Gevgelija and the heights of Matsikovo. Consequentially, the Bulgarian line of retreat through Dojran was threatened, and Ivanov's army began a desperate retreat, threatening at times to become a rout. Reinforcements from the 14th division came too late, joining the retreat towards Strumica and the Bulgarian border. The Greeks captured Dojran on 5 July but were unable to cut off the Bulgarian retreat through Struma Pass. On 11 July, the Greeks came in contact with the Serbs and then pushed up the Struma River. Meanwhile, the Greek forces, with the support of their navy, landed in Kavala and then penetrated inland to western Thrace. On 19 July, the Greeks captured Nevrokop, and on 25 July, in another amphibious operation, entered Dedeagac (today Alexandroupoli), thus cutting off the Bulgarians completely from the Aegean sea.

Greek troops advancing in the Kresna Gorge

The Serbian front had become static. Seeing that the Bulgarian Army in front of him had already been defeated, King Constantine ordered the Greek Army to march further into Bulgarian territory and take the capital city of Sofia. Constantine wanted a decisive victory despite objections by his Prime Minister, Eleftherios Venizelos, who realized that the Serbs, having won their territorial objectives, now adopted a passive stance and shifted the weight of carrying the rest of the war to the Greeks. In the pass of Kresna (Battle of Kresna Gorge), the Greeks were ambushed by the Bulgarian 2nd and 4th armies, which had newly arrived from the Serbian front and had taken defensive positions there. By 21 July, the Greek army was outnumbered by the now counterattacking Bulgarians, and the Bulgarian General Staff, attempting to encircle the Greeks in a Cannae-type battle, was applying pressure on their flanks. However, after bitter fighting, the Greek side managed to break through the Kresna pass and captured Simitli on 26 July, while at the night of 27–28 July, the Bulgarian forces were pushed north to Gorna Dzhumaya (Blagoevgrad), 76 km south of Sofia. Meanwhile, the Greek forces continued their march inland into western Thrace, on 26 July, they entered Xanthi and the next day Komotini. On 28 July, the Bulgarian army, under heavy pressure, was forced to abandon Gorna Dzhumaya.

The Greek army was exhausted and faced logistical difficulties, but resisted strenuously and launched local counterattacks. By 30 July, the Bulgarian army downscaled its attacks, having to repulse Greek counterattacks on both sides. On the eastern flank, the Greek army launched a counterattack towards Mehomia through the Predela pass. The offensive was stopped by the Bulgarians on the eastern side of the pass and fighting ground to a stalemate. On the western flank, an offensive was launched against Tsarevo Selo to reach the Serbian lines. This failed, and the Bulgarian army continued advancing, especially in the south. However, after three days of fighting at the sectors of Pehchevo and Mahomia, the Greek forces retained their positions.

== Romanian intervention ==
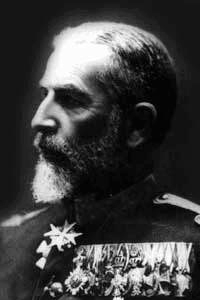
Carol I of Romania.

Romania mobilized its army on 5 July 1913, intending to seize Southern Dobruja, and declared war on Bulgaria on 10 July. In a diplomatic circular that said, "Romania does not intend either to subjugate the polity nor defeat the army of Bulgaria," the Romanian government endeavoured to allay international concerns about its motives and about increased bloodshed. According to Richard Hall, "[t]he entrance of Romania into the conflict made the Bulgarian situation untenable [and t]he Romanian thrust across the Danube was the decisive military act of the Second Balkan War." On the day of Romania's declaration, 80,000 men of the 5th Corps under General Ioan Culcer invaded Dobruja, occupying a front from Tutrakan to Balchik. The corps cavalry occupied the port city of Varna until it was clear that there would be no Bulgarian resistance. On the night of 14–15 July, the Danube Army under Prince Ferdinand crossed into Bulgaria at Oryahovo, Gigen and Nikopol. The initial occupation completed, Romanian forces were divided into two groups: one advanced westward, towards Ferdinand (now Montana), and the other advanced southwestward, towards Sofia, the Bulgarian capital, everywhere preceded by a wide fan of cavalry troops in reconnaissance.

On 18 July, Romania took Ferdinand, and on 20 July, they occupied Vratsa, 116 km north of Sofia. On 23 July, advanced cavalry forces had entered Vrazhdebna, a suburb only 7 miles (11 km) from Sofia. The Romanians and Serbs linked up at Belogradchik on 25 July, isolating the important city of Vidin. The Bulgarian rear was entirely exposed, no resistance had been offered, the capital was open to the invader, and the country's northwestern corner was cut off and surrounded. During the invasion, the fledgling Romanian Air Corps performed photoreconnaissance and propaganda leaflet drops. Sofia became the first capital city in the world to be overflown by enemy aircraft.

Romania did not count any combat casualties during its brief war. Its forces were struck by an outbreak of cholera, leaving 1,600 men dead.

== Ottoman intervention ==
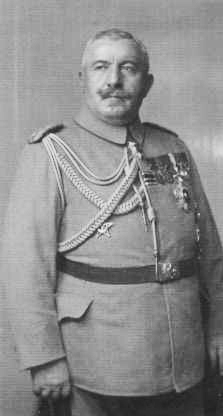
Ahmed Izzet Pasha in uniform (c. 1913)

The lack of resistance to the Romanian invasion convinced the Ottomans to invade the territories just ceded to Bulgaria. The main object of the invasion was the recovery of Edirne (Adrianople), which was held by Major General Vulko Velchev with a mere 4,000 troops. Most Bulgarian forces occupying East Thrace had been withdrawn to face the Serbian–Greek attack earlier in the year. On 12 July, Ottoman troops garrisoning Çatalca and Gelibolu reached the Enos–Midia line and on 20 July 1913 crossed the line and invaded Bulgaria. The Ottoman invasion force contained 200–250,000 men under the command of Ahmed Izzet Pasha. The Ottoman 1st Army was stationed at the eastern (Midia) end of the line. From east to west it was followed by the 2nd Army, 3rd Army and 4th Army, stationed at Gelibolu.

In the face of the advancing Ottomans, the outnumbered Bulgarian forces retreated to the prewar border and abandoned Edirne on 19 July. The Bulgarian command began to transfer troops to Thrace and on 20 July, with increasing resistance, the Turkish advance was temporarily halted. Edirne was re-occupied the next day, but was abandoned again on 21 July and occupied by the Ottomans on 23 July. Edirne had been conquered by Sultan Murad I in the 1360s and had served as the first European capital of the Empire before the capture of Constantinople in 1453. Minister of War Enver Pasha called himself the "Second Conqueror of Edirne," although the conquering forces had met no resistance on the way to Edirne.

Meanwhile, a Bulgarian ambush on an Ottoman reconnaissance unit led by Captain Reşit Bey left him killed and his unit suffered casualties.

The Ottoman armies did not stop at the old border but crossed into Bulgarian territory. A cavalry unit advanced on Yambol and captured it on 25 July. The Ottoman invasion, more than the Romanian, incited panic among the peasantry, a number of whom fled to the mountains. Among the Bulgarian leadership, it was recognized as a complete reversal of fortune. In the words of historian Richard Hall, "[t]he battlefields of eastern Thrace, where so many Bulgarian soldiers had died to win the First Balkan War, were again under Ottoman control." Like the Romanians, the Ottomans suffered no combat casualties but lost 4,000 soldiers to cholera. Some 8,000 Armenians fighting for the Ottomans were wounded. The sacrifice of these Armenians was praised greatly in Turkish papers.

To help Bulgaria repulse the rapid Ottoman advance in Thrace, Russia threatened to attack the Ottoman Empire through the Caucasus and send its Black Sea Fleet to Constantinople; this caused Britain to intervene.

The 1918 book "Destruction of the Thracian Bulgarians in 1913" describes how Ottoman forces perpetrated ethnic cleansing and other atrocities against the Bulgarians in Eastern Thrace during the invasion and aftermath,which resulted in the mass migration of the Thracian Bulgarians to Bulgaria and largely the end of the Bulgarian ethnic minority in the region.

== Negotiating a way out ==
=== Armistice ===
As the Romanian army closed in on Sofia, Bulgaria asked Russia to mediate. On 13 July, Prime Minister Stoyan Danev resigned in the face of Russian inactivity. On 17 July, the tsar appointed Vasil Radoslavov to head a pro-German and Russophobic government. On 20 July, via Saint Petersburg, the Serbian Prime Minister Nikola Pašić invited a Bulgarian delegation to treat with the allies directly at Niš in Serbia. The Serbs and Greeks, both now on the offensive, were in no rush to conclude a peace. On 22 July, Tsar Ferdinand sent a message to King Carol via the Italian ambassador in Bucharest. The Romanian armies halted before Sofia. Romania proposed that talks be moved to Bucharest, and the delegations took a train from Niš to Bucharest on 24 July.

When the delegations met in Bucharest on 30 July, the Serbs were led by Pašić, the Montenegrins by Vukotić, the Greeks by Venizelos, the Romanians by Titu Maiorescu and the Bulgarians by Finance Minister Dimitur Tonchev. They agreed to a five-day armistice to come into effect on 31 July. Romania refused to allow the Ottomans to participate, forcing Bulgaria to negotiate with them separately.

=== Treaty of Bucharest ===
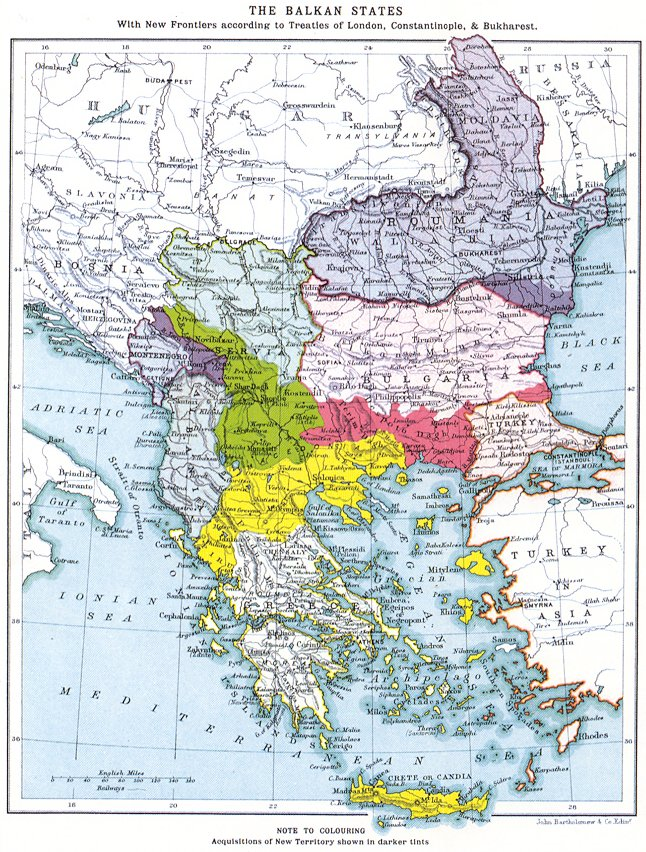
Map showing the final territorial gains of the Balkan countries after the Balkan Wars

Bulgaria had agreed to cede Southern Dobruja to Romania as early as 19 July. At the peace talks in Bucharest, the Romanians, having obtained their primary objective, were a voice for moderation. The Bulgarians hoped to keep the Vardar River as the boundary between their share of Macedonia and Serbia's. The latter preferred to retain all of Macedonia as far as the Struma. Austro-Hungarian and Russian pressure forced Serbia to be satisfied with most of northern Macedonia, conceding only the town of Štip to the Bulgarians, in Pašić's words, "in honour of General Fichev," who had brought Bulgarian arms to the door of Constantinople in the first war. Ivan Fichev was chief of the Bulgarian general staff and a member of the delegation in Bucharest at the time. When Fichev explained why Bulgaria deserved Kavala, a port on the Aegean occupied by the Greeks, Venizelos is said to have responded, "General, we are not responsible. Before [29] June, we were afraid of you and offered you Serres and Drama and Kavala, but now when we see you, we assume the role of victors and will take care of our interests only." Although Austria-Hungary and Russia supported Bulgaria, the influential alliance of Germany—whose Kaiser Wilhelm II was brother-in-law to the Greek king—and France secured Kavala for Greece. Bulgaria retained the underdeveloped port of Dedeagac (Alexandroupoli).

The last day of negotiations was 8 August. On 10 August, Bulgaria, Greece, Montenegro, Romania, and Serbia signed the Treaty of Bucharest and divided Macedonia in three: Vardar Macedonia went to Serbia; the smallest part, Pirin Macedonia, to Bulgaria; and the coastal and largest part, Aegean Macedonia, to Greece. Bulgaria thus enlarged its territory by 16 percent compared to what it was before the First Balkan War, increasing its population from 4.3 to 4.7 million people. Romania enlarged its territory by 5 percent and Montenegro by 62 percent. Greece increased her population from 2.7 to 4.4 million and her territory by 68 percent. Serbia almost doubled her territory, enlarging her population from 2.9 to 4.5 million. The Montenegrins at Bucharest were primarily interested in obtaining a favourable concession from Serbia in the former Sanjak of Novi Pazar. They did it, later confirming it in a treaty signed at Belgrade on 7 November.

=== Ottoman treaties ===
In August, Ottoman forces established a provisional government of Western Thrace at Komotini to pressure Bulgaria to make peace. Bulgaria sent a three-member delegation—General Mihail Savov and the diplomats Andrei Toshev and Grigor Nachovich—to Constantinople to negotiate peace on 6 September. The Ottoman delegation was led by Foreign Minister Mehmed Talat Bey, assisted by future Naval Minister Çürüksulu Mahmud Pasha and Halil Bey. Although Russia tried to intervene throughout August to prevent Edirne from becoming Turkish again, Toshev told the Ottomans at Constantinople that "[t]he Russians consider Constantinople their natural inheritance. Their main concern is that when Constantinople falls into their hands it shall have the largest possible hinterland. If Adrianople is in the possession of the Turks, they shall get it too."

Resigned to losing Edirne, the Bulgarians played for Kırk Kilise (Lozengrad in Bulgarian). Both sides made competing declarations: Savov that "Bulgaria, who defeated the Turks on all fronts, cannot end this glorious campaign with the signing of an agreement which retains none of the battlefields on which so much Bulgarian blood has been shed," and Mahmud Pasha that "[w]hat we have taken is ours." In the end, none of the battlefields were retained in the Treaty of Constantinople of 30 September. In October, Bulgarian forces finally returned south of the Rhodopes. The Radoslavov government continued negotiating with the Ottomans in the hopes of forming an alliance. These talks finally bore fruit in the Secret Bulgarian–Ottoman Treaty of August 1914.

As part of the Treaty of Constantinople, 46,764 Orthodox Bulgarians from Ottoman Thrace were exchanged for 48,570 Muslims (Turks, Pomaks, and Roma) from Bulgarian Thrace. After the exchange, according to the 1914 Ottoman census, there remained 14,908 Bulgarians belonging to the Bulgarian Exarchate in the Ottoman Empire.

On 14 November 1913, Greece and the Ottomans signed a treaty in Athens, formally ending their hostilities. On 14 March 1914, Serbia signed a treaty in Constantinople, restoring relations with the Ottoman Empire and reaffirming the 1913 Treaty of London. No treaty between Montenegro and the Ottoman Empire was ever signed.

== Atrocities and migrations ==
By the time of the war, the distinction between civilian and combatant had seriously eroded. Atrocities against civilians became widespread once the former Balkan allies began fighting one another.

Retreating Bulgarian forces "took out their frustrations on Greek civilians" through atrocities. Meanwhile, the advancing Serbian and Greek armies, angered by massacres committed by the retreating Bulgarian forces and irregulars, retaliated in kind. Ottoman forces returning to Eastern Thrace sought retaliation against the Bulgarian population, culminating in the "Destruction of Thracian Bulgarians", while even the Romanian army, despite encountering virtually no military resistance, committed atrocities.

=== By Bulgaria ===
During the retreat of the Bulgarian army through eastern Macedonia, several massacres of Greek civilians occurred. At Doxato, Bulgarian forces bombarded the town and a massacre followed, during which civilians were killed, women were raped and prominent inhabitants were taken hostage. The greater number of those killed were women and children. The attack was directly ordered by Bulgarian headquarters, who armed local Muslims and left them in control of the town, resulting in the massacre. At Serres, the retreating Bulgarian army set parts of the city on fire and civilians were killed in their homes, while, at Demir Hisar, Bulgarian troops and komitadjis carried out mass killings which included local notables and clergy.

There was also destruction of Greek villages elsewhere in eastern Macedonia as the Bulgarian forces withdrew, with villages getting repeatedly burned by the Bulgarians. British vice-consul H. E. W. Young reported Bulgarian atrocities against civilians were happening in Kavala and Xanthi as well, including in places which had surrendered without resistance. Contemporary Greek reports also alleged that around 1,500 Greeks had been murdered in the Nigrita district; The Daily Telegraph sent a correspondent to Nigrita and reported at least 470 people killed or burned alive in the town and another 1,100 murdered in the surrounding villages, a total of approximately 1,570.

Bulgarian forces also committed serious abuses on the Serbian front. During the occupation of areas around Knjaževac in eastern Serbia, killings, widespread pillaging and sexual violence were recorded against civilians. French journalist Henry Barby, who travelled through the area, compared the destruction unfavourably even with Bulgarian conduct in Macedonia and described the purpose of the advancing Bulgarian army as the devastation and pillage of the region.

In the nearby villages, Bulgarian detachments moved from settlement to settlement plundering houses and assaulting civilians; reports recorded sexual violence at Bulinovac, Vina and Slatina, including against girls as young as thirteen.

=== By Greece ===
The Greek advance northward was likewise accompanied by violence against Bulgarian civilians and the destruction of Bulgarian settlements, with the Greek Army "infuriated by the scale of massacres of the retreating Bulgarian army and irregulars" retaliating against Bulgarian civilians. For example, Bulgarian villages around Gevgelija were burned during the advance, while there were also reports of killings and other atrocities. Kilkis was partly destroyed by Greeks with artillery, in order to prevent Bulgarian irregular forces from returning, while its destruction also carried a symbolic meaning because of its association with the Bulgarian national movement. The Greek army also burned Strumitsa between 21–27 August and attributed it to the Bulgarians afterwards.

The violence was not, however, encouraged uniformly by Greek officers, and there were some attempts to restrain it. For example, when Captain Alexandros Mazarakis entered Serres after the Bulgarian withdrawal, he encountered a city in which destruction by irregulars had already begun and organized local committees in an attempt to prevent inhabitants from looting Bulgarian property.

=== By Serbia ===
Serbian forces also carried out reprisals against Bulgarian civilians during their advance. After Bulgarian troops withdrew from eastern Serbia, Serbian units crossed the Bulgarian frontier and devastated a number of settlements around Vidin and Belogradchik, burning houses and killing civilians. Muslim auxiliaries returned alongside the Serbian regular army and paramilitary formations and attacked the Bulgarian Exarchist population around Kratovo, Radoviš and the Tikveš. Serbian authorities were reported to have known of, and in some cases been directly responsible for, the violence, which contributed to the flight of thousands of civilians to Bulgaria.

Serbia also employed local armed groups in areas where the Internal Macedonian Revolutionary Organization and Bulgarian national organizations remained active, and Serbian authorities armed Muslim auxiliaries to oppose the IMRO during the summer of 1913 in what became known as the Tikveš uprising. Serbian forces surrounded and burned the town and the surrounding villages, killing 227 people, while the total number of victims reached 633. In Negotino, 280 Bulgarians were killed and their bodies thrown into the Vardar River. Among them were entire families with underage children. Following the Serbian victory, pressure on Bulgarian national institutions in Serbian-held Macedonia intensified, and Bulgarian schools, ecclesiastical institutions and political organizations were increasingly displaced by Serbian institutions, causing the Bulgarian Exarchate's network to get "destroyed" in the region.

=== By Romania ===
The Romanian invasion of Bulgaria encountered almost no organized military opposition, and the campaign was considerably less bloody than the fighting on the Serbian and Greek fronts. Romania declared that it did not seek to destroy the Bulgarian state or army, and its principal objective was the acquisition of Southern Dobruja. The Romanian army advanced deep into Bulgaria without a major battle, and Romanian military losses resulted overwhelmingly from disease rather than combat.

However, despite the lack of Bulgarian resistance, abuses against the civilian population still occurred. Romanian soldiers engaged in burning, looting and rape during their advance through Bulgaria.

=== By the Ottoman Empire ===
The Ottoman reoccupation of Eastern Thrace during the Second Balkan War was accompanied by extensive violence against its Bulgarian Christian population. With the Bulgarian army engaged against Greece and Serbia, Ottoman forces crossed the Enos–Midia line and rapidly recovered Adrianople, meeting no resistance. Historian Darko Majstorović argues that the campaign marked the development by the Committee of Union and Progress of a "specific, new and systematic form of violence" which was subsequently applied against other Christian populations during World War I. Up to 60,000 Bulgarian civilians are estimated to have been killed.

Ottoman regular troops were accompanied by irregular formations and refugees, and widespread pillaging, killing, rape and destruction followed the reconquest. Historian Panagiotis Delis writes that Eastern Thrace was a "laboratory of ethnic expulsion", with diplomatic representatives of the Great Powers reporting lawlessness and impunity, with soldiers and irregulars pillaging villages sometimes in the presence of Ottoman officers. These ethnic cleansing operations were conducted principally by irregulars encouraged by the Ottoman state, while local Muslims also participated in reprisals against Bulgarians.

Violence also affected the Greek population in Eastern Thrace. Just like Bulgarians, Greeks suffered intimidation, pillaging and violence in 1913, which became widespread, with some of the most serious attacks occurring around Malkara and Rodosto. Historian Taner Akçam dates the beginning of expulsions and forcible migration from Eastern Thrace to the spring and summer of 1913, just after the Ottoman reoccupation, and notes that attacks continued through the year, before assuming a more systematic character after March 1914.

During the spring and summer of 1914, the campaign spread particularly strongly to the Aegean coast of Anatolia. Historian Matthias Bjørnlund estimates that more than 100,000 Greeks were removed from the Aegean and Thrace during this phase and describes the campaign as part of a policy of "violent Turkification". In June 1914, armed bands attacked Phocaea from several directions, killing inhabitants and systematically looting homes and shops, forcing thousands of Greeks or evacute to nearby islands, in what became known as the Massacre of Phocaea. Bjørnlund notes that attacks at Phocaea and elsewhere coincided with the settlement of Muslim refugees from the Balkan Wars in areas abandoned by Greeks and regards the simultaneous operations as evidence of an organized anti-Greek campaign.

=== Death toll ===
The civilian death toll is difficult to determine in total. Historian Alan R. Kramer, citing the Report of the International Commission on the Balkan Wars, tried to summarize some of the known evidence:

In the Second Balkan War, [p]robably 500 Greeks were killed at Doxato, (Note: Some sources report 600; a postwar investigation found around 600 bodies collected from the fields at Doxato in 1913.) 200 Bulgarians at Seres/Serres, and there were mutual killings of Greeks and Bulgarians at Demir-Hissar. Muslims and Greeks were forced to abandon their homes in the part of Macedonia occupied by Bulgaria under threat of massacre, and there were forced conversions to Bulgarian nationality and from Islam to Christianity. There were massacres [by Bulgarian and Ottoman forces and irregulars] of Greeks, Bulgarians, Turks, and Armenians in Adrianople (today Edirne) and elsewhere in Thrace in the period March to July 1913, with "many thousands" killed. Serbian and Montenegrin troops committed mass violence "with a view to the entire transformation of the ethnic character of regions inhabited exclusively by Albanians". At Ohrid 150 Bulgarians and 500 Turks and Albanians were killed by Serb forces, and throughout Serbian Macedonia the new regime attempted to impose its culture and Orthodox religion.

=== Migrations ===
Southern Dobruja, annexed by Romania, and Eastern Thrace, re-annexed by the Ottoman Empire, were the two biggest sources of migrations for Bulgarian refugees after Bulgaria's defeat. It is estimated that slightly over 100,000 Bulgarians, mainly from the two aforementioned areas, migrated to Bulgaria in total. Around 10,000 Greeks also fled the Bulgarian-controlled parts of Macedonia or left the Serbian-controlled parts for Greece.

The 1913 Ottoman–Bulgarian exchange, signed after the war, legalized the emigration of 48,570 Muslims from Bulgarian territory (mostly from the First Balkan War) and 46,764 Bulgarians from Ottoman Eastern Thrace (mostly from the Second Balkan War).

== Aftermath ==
The Second Balkan War made Serbia the most militarily powerful state south of the Danube. Years of military investment financed by French loans borne fruit. Central Vardar and the eastern half of the Sanjak of Novi Pazar were acquired. Its territory grew in extent from 18,650 to 33,891 square miles, and its population grew by more than one and a half million. The aftermath brought harassment and oppression for those in the newly conquered lands. The freedom of association, assembly and the press guaranteed under the Serbian constitution of 1903 was not introduced into the new territories. The inhabitants were denied voting rights, ostensibly because the cultural level was considered too low, in reality, to keep the non-Serbs, who made up the majority in multiple areas, out of national politics. Opposition newspapers like Radicke Novine remarked that the 'new Serbs' had better political rights under the Turks. There was a destruction of Turkish buildings, schools, baths, mosques. In October and November 1913, British vice-consuls reported systematic intimidation, arbitrary detentions, beatings, rapes, village burnings and massacres by Serbs in the annexed areas. The Serbian government showed no interest in preventing further outrages or investigating those that had happened. When the Carnegie Commission, composed of an international team of experts selected for their impartiality, arrived in the Balkans, they received virtually no assistance from Belgrade.

The treaties forced the Greek Army to evacuate Western Thrace and Pirin Macedonia, which it had occupied during operations. The retreat from the areas that had to be ceded to Bulgaria, together with the loss of Northern Epirus to Albania, was not well received in Greece; from the areas occupied during the war, Greece succeeded in gaining only the territories of Serres and Kavala after diplomatic support from Germany. Serbia made additional gains in northern Macedonia and, having fulfilled its aspirations to the south, turned its attention to the north where its rivalry with Austro-Hungary over Bosnia-Herzegovina led the two countries to war a year later igniting the First World War. Italy used the excuse of the Balkan wars to keep the Dodecanese islands in the Aegean, which it had occupied during the Italo-Turkish War of 1911 over Libya, despite the agreement that ended that war in 1912.

At the strong insistence of Austria-Hungary and Italy, both hoping to control for themselves the state and thus the Otranto Straits in the Adriatic, Albania acquired officially its independence according to the terms of the Treaty of London. With the delineation of the exact boundaries of the new state under the Protocol of Florence (17 December 1913), the Serbs lost their outlet to the Adriatic and the Greeks in the region of Northern Epirus (Southern Albania). This was highly unpopular with the local Greek population, who, after a revolt, managed to acquire local autonomy under the terms of the Protocol of Corfu.

After its defeat, Bulgaria became a revanchist local power looking for a second opportunity to fulfill its national aspirations. After Bucharest, the head of the Bulgarian delegation, Tonchev, remarked that "[e]ither the Powers will change [the territorial settlement], or we will destroy it."

To this end, it participated in the First World War on the side of the Central Powers since its Balkan enemies (Serbia, Montenegro, Greece, and Romania) were pro-Entente (see articles on the Serbian Campaign and the Macedonian front of World War I). The resulting enormous sacrifices during World War I and renewed defeat caused Bulgaria a national trauma and new territorial losses.

The political upheavals and territorial shifts resulting from the Second Balkan War also resonated beyond Europe. The Indian Muslim community, with its strong pan-Islamic sentiment towards the Ottoman Empire, was significantly impacted. The Indian Red Crescent Mission's involvement with the Ottoman lands during the Balkan Wars fostered a deeper connection between Indian Muslims and the Ottoman cause, influencing political movements in India, including the Khilafat Movement and the eventual founding of the Muslim League.

== List of battles ==
=== Bulgarian–Greek battles ===
Battle	Date	Bulgaria Commander	Greece Commander	Result
Battle of Angitis	5–6 June 1913 (23–24 May O.S.)	Mihail Savov	Constantine I	Bulgarian Victory
Battle of Kalinovo	2–4 July 1913 (19–21 June O.S.)	Konstantin Kavarnaliev	Leonidas Paraskevopoulos	Greek Victory
Battle of Kilkis-Lahanas	2–4 July 1913 (19–21 June O.S.)	Nikola Ivanov	Constantine I	Greek Victory
Battle of Doiran	6 July 1913 (23 June O.S.)	Nikola Ivanov	Constantine I	Greek Victory
Battle of Hill 1378	25–28 July 1913 (12–15 July O.S.)	Vasil Delov	Dionysios Papadopoulos; Ioannis Velissariou	Greek Victory
Battle of Kresna Gorge	21–31 July 1913 (8–18 July O.S.)	Mihail Savov	Constantine I	Final Armistice

=== Bulgarian–Serbian battles ===
Battle	Date	Bulgaria Commander	Serbia Commander	Result
Battle of Bregalnica	30 June–9 July 1913 (17–26 June O.S.)	Stiliyan Kovachev	Radomir Putnik	Serbian Victory
Battle of Knjaževac	4–7 July 1913 (21–24 June O.S.)	Vasil Kutinchev	Vukoman Aračić	Bulgarian Victory
Battle of Pirot	6–8 July 1913 (23–25 June O.S.)	Racho Petrov	Božidar Janković	Serbian Victory
Battle of Belogradchik	8 July 1913 (25 June O.S.)	Radko Dimitriev	Božidar Janković	Serbian Victory
Siege of Vidin	12–18 July 1913 (29 June–5 July O.S.)	Krastyu Marinov	Vukoman Aračić	Bulgarian Victory
Battle of Kalimanci	17–24 July 1913 (4–11 July O.S.)	Mihail Savov	Božidar Janković	Bulgarian Victory

=== Bulgarian–Ottoman battles ===
Battle	Year	Bulgaria Commander	Ottoman Empire Commander	Result
Siege of Adrianople	1913	Mihail Savov	Enver Pasha	Final Armistice

=== Bulgarian–Romanian battles ===
Battle	Year	Bulgaria Commander	Romania Commander	Result
Romanian landings in Varna	1913	Ferdinand I	Carol I	First Armistice
Southern Dobruja Offensive	1913	Ferdinand I	Carol I	Final Armistice

== See also ==
- Serbo-Bulgarian War (1885)

== Sources ==
- Borodziej, Włodzimierz; Górny, Maciej (2021). Forgotten Wars: Central and Eastern Europe, 1912–1916. Translated by Tilbury, Jasper. Cambridge: Cambridge University Press. ISBN 978-1-108-83715-6.
- Erickson, Edward J. (2003). Defeat in Detail: The Ottoman Army in the Balkans, 1912–1913. Praeger. ISBN 0-275-97888-5.
- Gedeon, Dimitrios (1998). A concise history of the Balkan Wars, 1912–1913 (1.udg. ed.). Athens: Hellenic Army General Staff. p. 260. ISBN 978-960-7897-07-7.
- Hall, Richard C. (2000). The Balkan Wars, 1912–1913: Prelude to the First World War. Routledge. ISBN 0-415-22946-4.
- Ivetic, Egidio (2012). Balkanskite voyni [The Balkan Wars] (in Bulgarian). Sofia: Ciela Norma AD. ISBN 978-954-28-1202-9.
- Markov, Georgi (2012). Balgariya v Balkanskiya sayuz sreshtu Osmanskata imperiya, 1911–1913 [Bulgaria in the Balkan League against the Ottoman Empire, 1911–1913] (in Bulgarian). Sofia: Zahariy Stoyanov. ISBN 978-954-09-0725-3.
- Markov, Georgi (2017). Balgarskoto krushenie 1913 [The Bulgarian Catastrophe 1913] (in Bulgarian). Sofia: Zahariy Stoyanov. ISBN 978-954-09-1166-3.
- Stoyanov, Aleksandar (2015). Istoriya na voynite: Balkanskite voyni na balgarskata armiya [History of the Wars: The Balkan Wars of the Bulgarian Army] (in Bulgarian). Sofia: Milenium. ISBN 978-954-515-328-0.
