= Treaty of London (1913) =

1913 settlement following the First Balkan War

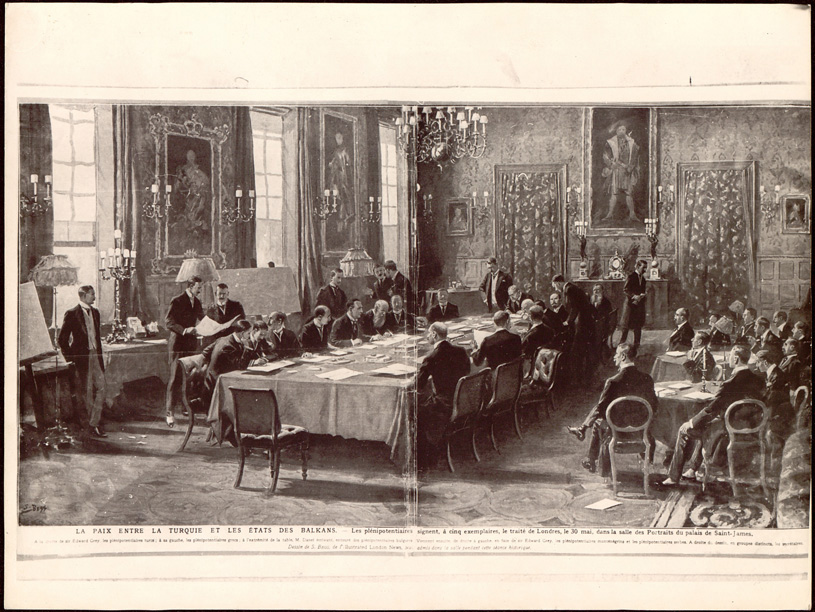
- The signing of the treaty in St James's Palace
- Signed: 30 May 1913
- Location: London, United Kingdom
- Signatories: Bulgaria; Serbia; Greece; Montenegro; Italy; Germany; Russia; Austria-Hungary

The Treaty of London (1913) was signed on 30 May following the London Conference of 1912–1913. It dealt with the territorial adjustments arising out of the conclusion of the First Balkan War. The London Conference had ended on 23 January 1913, when the 1913 Ottoman coup d'état took place and Ottoman Grand Vizier Kâmil Pasha was forced to resign. Coup leader Enver Pasha withdrew the Ottoman Empire from the Conference, and the Treaty of London was signed without the presence of the Ottoman delegation.

Further border changes were ratified in the Treaty of Bucharest in August 1913, following the conclusion of the Second Balkan War.

== Combatants ==
The combatants were the victorious Balkan League (Serbia, Greece, Bulgaria, and Montenegro) and the defeated Ottoman Empire. Representing the Great Powers were the United Kingdom, Germany, Russia, Austria-Hungary, and Italy.

== History ==
Hostilities had officially ceased on 2 December 1912, except for Greece that had not participated in the first truce. Three principal points were in dispute:

- the status of the territory of present-day Albania, the vast majority of which had been conquered especially by Serbia, but also small regions by Montenegro, and Greece
- the status of the Sanjak of Novi Pazar formally under the protection of Austria-Hungary since the Treaty of Berlin in 1878
- the status of the other territories taken by the Allies: Kosovo vilayet; Macedonia; and Thrace

The Treaty was negotiated in London at an international conference which had opened there in December 1912, following the declaration of independence by Albania on 28 November 1912.

Austria-Hungary and Italy strongly supported the creation of an independent Albania. In part, this was consistent with Austria-Hungary's previous policy of resisting Serb expansion to the Adriatic; Italy had designs on the territory, manifested in 1939. Russia supported Serbia and Montenegro. Germany and Britain remained neutral. The balance of power struck between the members of the Balkan League had been on the assumption that no Albanian polity would be formed and the later Albanian territory would be split between them.

== Terms ==
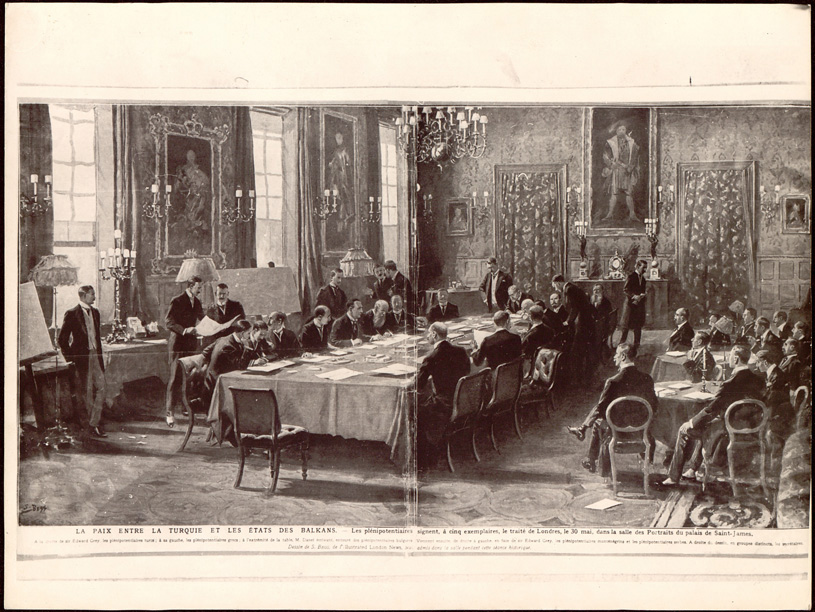
Signing of the Peace Treaty on 30 May 1913

The terms enforced by the Great Powers were:

- All European territory of the Ottoman Empire west of the line between Enos on the Aegean Sea and Midia on the Black Sea was ceded to the Balkan League, except Albania.
- His Majesty the Emperor of the Ottomans declares that he cedes to their Majesties the Allied Sovereigns the island of Crete and that he renounces in their favour all rights of sovereignty and all other rights which he possessed in that island.
- The borders of Albania and all other questions concerning Albania were to be settled by the Great Powers.

However, the division of the territories ceded to the Balkan League was not addressed in the Treaty, and Serbia refused to carry out the division agreed with Bulgaria in their treaty of March 1912. As a result of Bulgarian dissatisfaction with the de facto military division of Macedonia, the Second Balkan War broke out between the combatants on 16 June 1913. The Bulgarians were defeated, and the Ottomans made some gains west of the Enos-Midia line. A final peace was agreed at the Treaty of Bucharest on 12 August 1913. A separate treaty, the Treaty of Constantinople, was concluded between the Bulgarians and Turks, largely defining the modern-day borders between the two countries.

== Perceptions ==
The delineation of the exact boundaries of the Albanian state under the Protocol of Florence (17 December 1913) was highly unpopular among the Greek population of southern Albania. They rebelled and declared the Autonomous Republic of Northern Epirus. This was internationally recognised as an autonomous region inside Albania under the terms of the Protocol of Corfu.

Albanians have tended to regard the Treaty as an injustice imposed by the Great Powers, as roughly half of the predominantly Albanian territories and 30–50% of the population were left outside the new country's borders.

== See also ==
- Treaties of London
