= Domus Elegance Collection =

- Industry: Hospitality, Historic Hotels
- Founded: 1992; 34 years ago
- Founder: Christos and Ioanna Paraskevakis
- Headquarters: Chania, Crete, Greece
- Number of locations: (January 2025)
- Website: domuselegancecollection.com

Domus Elegance Collection is a group of boutique hotels housed in buildings of historic significance in Chania, Crete, Greece. The collection operates primarily in Chania Old Town, with Domus Renier, and in the historic district of Halepa, with Domus Blanc. Both properties are listed heritage buildings dating to the Venetian Rule (Venetocracy) era and Ottoman period in Crete.

== History and architecture ==
The hotels within the Domus Elegance Collection are housed in historical buildings connected to key phases of Chania's urban and social development. Their histories are associated with periods of Venetian, Ottoman, and later European presence in the city.

=== Domus Renier ===
Domus Renier is located at the Venetian Harbor of Chania and was built in 1608, during the period of Venetian rule, as indicated by the inscription on the entrance arch. It originally served as the residence of the Renier family, a noble house of Venice. Venetian rule in Crete ended in 1669 with the Ottoman conquest of the island, following the Siege of Candia, during which the building underwent alterations, including the addition of an enclosed balcony on the third floor.

In recent years, Renier Mansion has operated as a hotel by Domus Elegance. In 2018, it was recognized by Historic Hotels Worldwide® as “Best Historic Hotel in Europe for 2017”. The selection criteria include the age of the building, the historical significance of its location, its proximity to the historic city center, the quality and aesthetic value of the restoration, the incorporation of historical continuity into the contemporary architectural design, and the presence of memorabilia, artifacts, and works of art displayed on the premises. In 2026, the property was recognized as one of the “Top 25 Historic Hotels Worldwide® Most Romantic Hotels 2026”. Eligibility criteria required properties to be at least 75 years old and recognized for their historical significance.

=== Domus Blanc ===
During the period of Ottoman rule in Crete, particularly after the signing of the Pact of Halepa in 1878 and the establishment of the Cretan State in 1898, the city of Chania developed into a cosmopolitan and economically significant center. The district of Halepa emerged as one of the city's principal areas during this period. The area housed the consulates of the Great Powers and was associated with political, social, and cultural activity during the Belle Époque. Among these were the French Consulate and the residence of consul Paul Blanc. This building today houses and operates as the Domus Blanc hotel, member of Domus Elegance Collection.

The building was erected in 1870 by engineer Leonidas Lygounis and was given as a dowry to his daughter Erasmia upon her marriage to Paul Blanc, the French consul in Crete. Blanc, born in 1855, began his diplomatic career as vice-consul in Constantinople and, in May 1886, was appointed head of the French Consulate in Crete. Blanc was associated with Eleftherios Venizelos, and both supported the independence of Crete, a position that brought them into conflict with Prince George.

Christos and Ioanna Paraskevakis acquired the property in 1992 and later passed it to their daughters, Litsa and Aria Paraskevaki. The restoration, which lasted over four years, was designed by architects Aristomenis and Giorgos Varoudakis, with interior design by Giorgos Chrysochoou, the same team that had worked on Domus Renier. The construction of the basement took eighteen months, and part of the former guardhouse was converted into a bistro. The building opened in 2024 as a boutique hotel with 12 suites, and in 2026, Domus Blanc became a member of Historic Hotels Worldwide.

The building is also associated with Florentine Kaloutsi, a Cretan artist who studied painting and design in England from 1906. Upon returning to Crete six years later, she rented the former French consulate and installed 150 looms for weaving traditional Cretan textiles, a craft with documented origins in the Minoan period.
