= George Oldenburg =

George Oldenburg may refer to:

- George I of Greece (1845–1913), monarch of Greece
- Prince George of Greece and Denmark (1869–1957), second son of George I of Greece
- Prince George of Denmark (1653–1708), husband of Queen Anne of England
