= Konstantinos Foumis =

Greek politician

- Κωνσταντίνος Φούμης
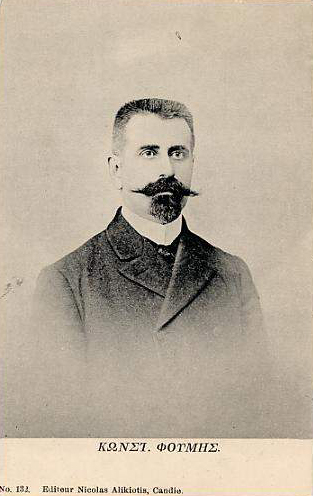
- Born: 1860
- Died: 1942 (aged 81–82)
- Occupation: politician
- Known for: Theriso revolt
- Title: Minister of Finance, Cretan State; Member of parliament, Cretan State

Konstantinos Foumis (1860 - 1942) was a Greek politician from Crete and one of the rebel leaders in the Theriso Revolt.

== Biography ==
He was born in Crete and had ancestry from the Byzantine Skordila family. He studied law at the University of Athens and in 1888 took over with Eleftherios Venizelos the publication of the newspaper Lefka Ori. He was involved in politics and was a close associate and friend of Eleftherios Venizelos. He was elected in 1899 as a representative of the province of Selino in the Cretan Assembly and was appointed advisor of finance (minister) of the Cretan State in the government formed by Prince George. In 1905 he participated in the trio that organized the revolution in Therisos. He continued to be involved in politics as an elected representative of his district after the revolution in Therisos.
