= George of Greece =

George of Greece may refer to:

- George I of Greece - King of Greece from 1863 to 1913
- George II of Greece - King of Greece from 1922 to 1924 and from 1935 to 1947
- Prince George of Greece and Denmark - second son of King George I and Queen Olga
