= Konstantinos Manos =

Former mayor of Chania, Greece

- Κωνσταντίνος Μάνος
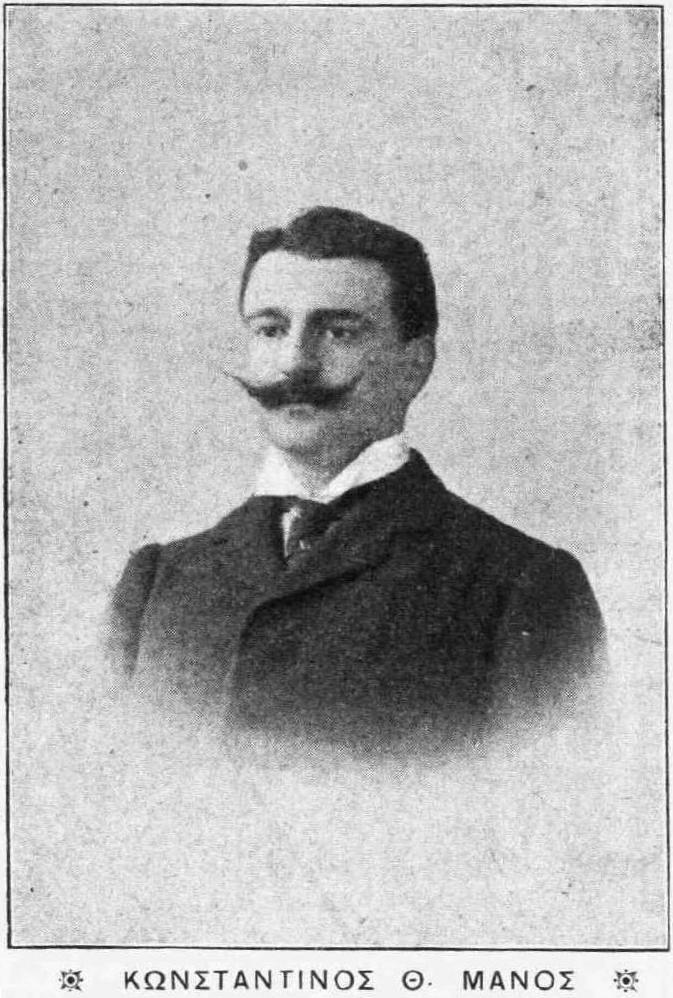

Mayor of Chania
- In office 1900–1902
- Governor: Prince George (as High Commissioner)

Personal details
- Born: 1869 Athens, Kingdom of Greece
- Died: 4 April 1913 (aged 44) Langadas, Kingdom of Greece
- Relations: Petros Manos
- Parent: Thrasyvoulos Manos
- Education: Leipzig University; Oxford University
- Occupation: Revolutionary; Soldier; Poet; Politician; Sportsman
- Awards: Order of the Redeemer

Military service
- Allegiance: Kingdom of Greece
- Branch/service: Hellenic Army
- Battles/wars: Greco-Turkish War (1897); Cretan Revolt; Macedonian Struggle; Theriso revolt; Goudi coup; Balkan Wars: First Balkan War; Second Balkan War †

Konstantinos Manos (Greek: Κωνσταντίνος Μάνος; 1869–1913) was a Greek politician, poet, soldier and sportsman and former mayor of Chania.

== Biography ==
=== Personal life and military career ===
He was born in 1869 in Athens. His parents came from historical families. Specifically, his father, Thrasyvoulos Manos, was a military officer and came from a Phanariot family, while his mother, Roxani Mavromichalis, from the Mavromichalis family.

He was the older brother of Petros Manos. He studied law in Leipzig and philosophy in Oxford. He was a teacher of Empress Elisabeth of Austria. He pioneered the organization of the first modern Olympic Games held in Athens which would later be the 1896 Summer Olympics. He was the founder of Athens Athletic Club.

With the proclamation of the Cretan Revolution in 1896 he went to Crete, where he led the Holy Corps, which he created. Various disappointments led him to leave Greece and travel, reaching as far as Alaska. He later returned to Crete to serve as mayor of Chania for two years (1900 - 1902).

His militant action, however, was not limited to the Cretan Revolution. He also took part in the Macedonian Struggle, using the pseudonym Michailidis. In 1905 he took part in the Cretan assembly of Therissos, while he came into conflict with Prince George, High Commissioner of the Cretan State. In 1909 he took part in the Goudi Coup. He was then appointed a representative in both subsequent review parliaments.

During the First Balkan War he led a corps of Cretan volunteers in the Epirus front. His military corps helped, among other things, in the liberation of Preveza. In April 1913, he was killed in action when his plane crashed in Langadas during a reconnaissance flight to a Bulgarian camp.

=== Literary work ===
Despite only 44 years of his life, Konstantinos Manos wrote several poems, which he published in the only collection he published under the title Words of the Heart. His collection was honored with the first commendation in the Philadelphia competition. He also pioneered the introduction of the vernacular together with Lorentzos Mavilis. In 1905 he published a translation of Sophocles' Antigone in the elementary school, a pioneering event for his time.

=== Sports career ===
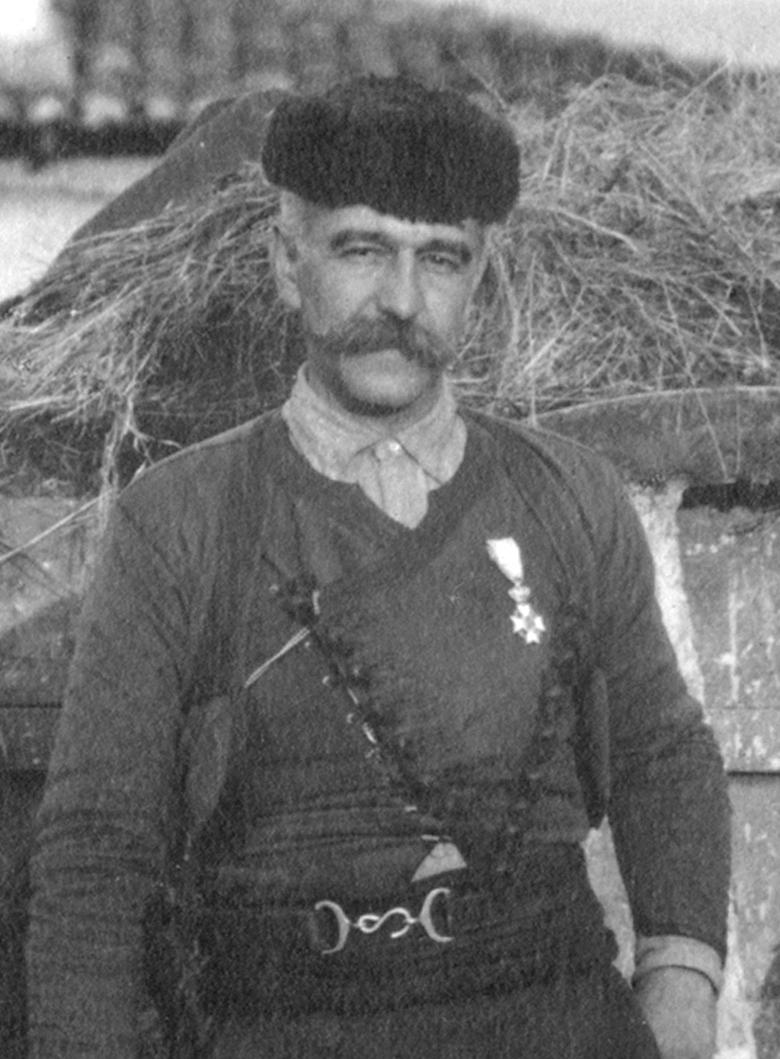
Konstantinos Manos, in Cretan dress, on the Epirus front in December 1912.

Konstantinos Manos was among those who saw the undertaking by Greece of the organization of the first modern Olympic Games, in 1896, as a unique opportunity to promote national law. The (then) successor Konstantinos, as president of the National Olympic Committee, recognized the skills of K. Manos and appointed him general secretary of the National Olympic Committee.

Konstantinos Manos was the first to offer money for the Olympic Games, and in fact the important amount of 10,000 drachmas for that time. He was also the founder of the "Athens Athletic Club".

K. Manos was an extreme supporter of amateurism. He was the author of the first rules of the game, according to which all forms of professionalism were eliminated from the field of sports. The eradication of all kinds of professionalism from sports has caused conflicts and confusion in the world of sports. The gymnasts of the time, led by Ioannis Chrysafis, reacted against Manos, because according to his regulations, all gymnasts were excluded from the Panhellenic Games and the Olympic Games, as professionals.

In 1904, Konstantinos Manos lost his status as a member of the National Olympic Committee by an act of its President, successor Konstantinos, because he was absent from three consecutive meetings of the National Olympic Committee. However, the real reason for K. Manos' absence from the meetings was that he had been imprisoned in Turkish prisons, having gone to (then enslaved) Western Macedonia, an envoy of the Macedonian Committee, to take over the leadership of the Macedonian Struggle. It was released in 1905. The deletion from the National Olympic Committee is a tangible item that no longer enjoyed the favor of the palace.

== Bibliography ==
- Kitriotis Dimitris, Mylonas Giannis: Biographies & Essays of Greek authors, Pataki Publications, Athens 1997, ISBN 960-293-066-7
- Kyriakos A. Georgiou, Antonia Papastylianou: Biographies of Modern Greek Writers, Giannis Rizou Publications, Athens 1980
- Haderer Stefan: Under the Spell of a Myth. Empress Sisi in Greece, KDP, Seattle 2022, ISBN 979-884-42195-0-4
- Great Encyclopedia Giovanni, edition 1979, volume 14
- Kaimakamis Vassilios: Special Issues of the Olympic Games, Thessaloniki 2012, ISBN 978-618-80168-1-1
