= Ioannis Sfakianakis =

Creatan politician (1848–1924)

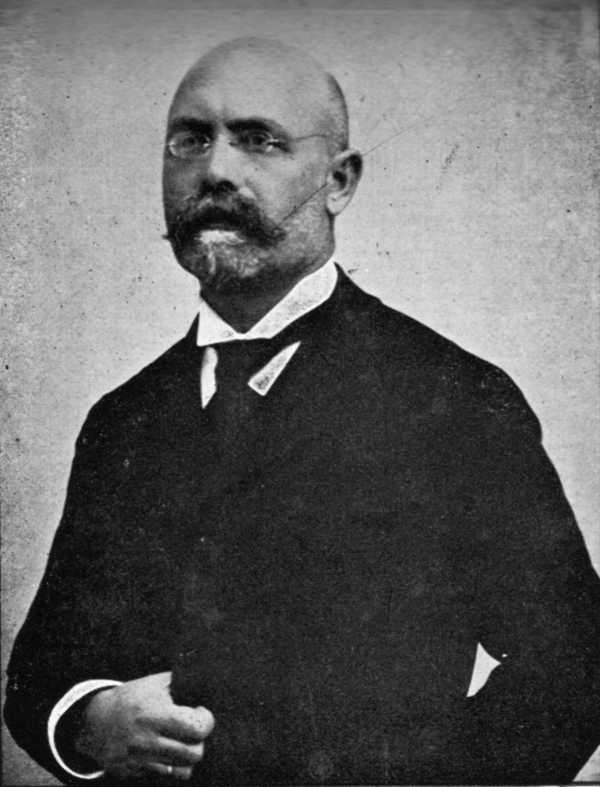
Ioannis Sfakianakis

Ioannis Sfakianakis (c. 1848–1924) was a Cretan politician of the late 19th century with a significant contribution in the political life of the island and the union with Greece.

After his medical studies, he settled in Heraklion working as a doctor. He participated in all the major revolutions against the Ottoman Empire and distinguished for his rhetorical abilities and his prudence. He was the president of the Cretan revolutionary assembly (1878) and the main negotiator for the Pact of Halepa. During the revolution of 1897 he was president of the Cretan general assembly and later the first Speaker of the Cretan parliament.

In 1905 he supported the Theriso revolt and Eleftherios Venizelos. He was elected representative of Heraklion several times. He died in 1924 in Athens and was honoured by the Hellenic Parliament.
