= Emmanouil Antoniadis =

Greek journalist and politician (1791–1863)

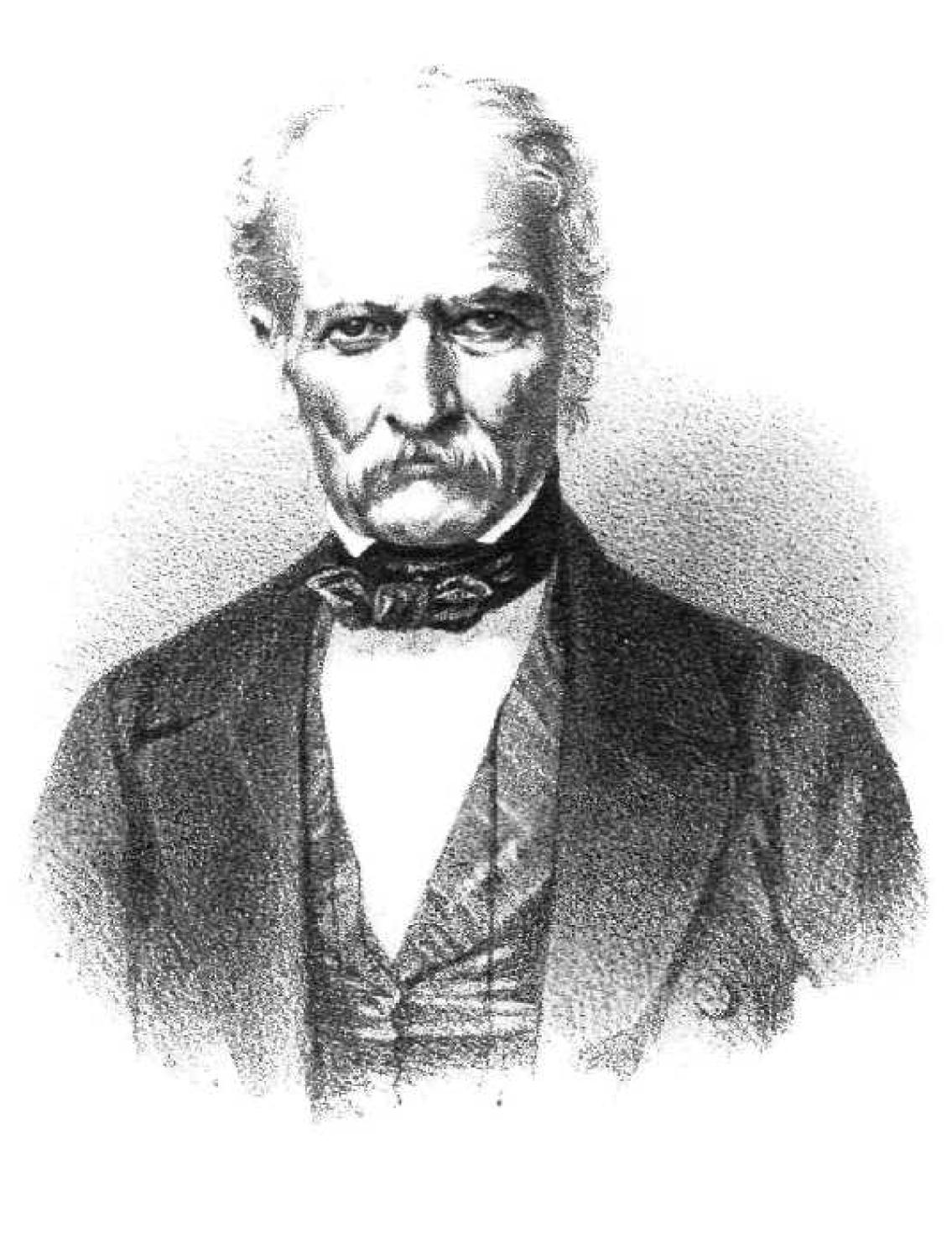
Emmanouil Antoniadis Portrait (1865)

Emmanouil Antoniadis (c. 1791–1863) was a revolutionary in the Greek War of Independence, a politician and a journalist from the island of Crete.

== Biography ==
He was born in the village of Halepa, near Chania, in about 1791. He acquired great education and was able to speak two foreign languages fluently (French and Italian). In 1814 he went to Istanbul in order to work as a secretary. There he became a member of the Filiki Eteria. Because of his revolutionary actions, he had to flee from Istanbul to Odessa, hunted by the Turks. From there, through Vienna and Trieste, he came to the Peloponnese right before the outburst of the Greek War of Independence.

In 1822, in Crete, alongside Joseph Valest, he faced-off against a Turko-Egyptian army of 10.000 men right outside the village of Malaksa, where they acquired a victory of great importance. When Ibrahim set foot on the Peloponnese with his Turko-Egyptian army, Emmanouil gathered an army of Cretans and, outside the village of Mili, near Nafplio, beat them in battle, making them fall back to the city of Tripoli.

He took part as an attorney of Crete in both the second and the third National Assemblies of Greece (the first in 1823 and the second in 1827). After the battle of Malaksa in 1825, he joined the Greek parliament.

He was one of the first journalists in Greece and also an editor for the newspaper Athena (Αθηνά).

He died in Athens.

== Sources ==
- Nikolaos Saripolos, "Λόγος επικήδειος είς Εμμανουήλ Αντωνιάδην", 2 August 1863
