= Thomas Backhouse Sandwith =

British diplomat (1831–1900)

Thomas Backhouse Sandwith (1831-1900) was a member of the British consular service in the Levant. He was a Vice Consul in Syria 1857 to 1865, and then Vice Consul in Cyprus between 1865 and 1870. He was Consul in Chania, Crete from 1870 to 1885, in Tunis 1885 to 1888 and Consul-General in Odessa 1888 to 1891.

== Background ==
Thomas Sandwith was born in Bridlington in 1831 into a family long resident in Yorkshire in which successive generations had practiced medicine, as did his father. Like numerous middle-class families of the time, the Sandwiths believed strongly in education (at least for their sons) and he went to good schools: Christ's Hospital (while his father took a break from medicine to edit a Methodist journal in the London, for he was a strongly committed Methodist), Wesley College Sheffield, and Edinburgh Academy. From there he went to St Catharine's College, Cambridge, whence he graduated in 1855.

== Consular career ==
In 1855, a year into the Crimean War, Sandwith sailed to Constantinople to work for the recently appointed Consul in Aleppo. The post was personal and unpaid and was seemingly arranged by his elder brother Humphry, who for some years had been a doctor in the city and was then a medical officer with the Turkish forces fighting the Russians. But events intervened and he went instead to support the same Consul who had been sent by the British Ambassador on a special mission to the Dardanelles to handle disputes in the British-funded Turkish irregular cavalry. Here he witnessed the so-called mutiny by General Beatson and the General's dismissal. He then spent the winter with the irregular cavalry in Bulgaria where it faced further crises. The Consul helped gather witnesses for the inquiry into Beatson's alleged incitement of the 'mutiny', and they then both went to Aleppo in spring 1857.

After a few months helping the Consul in Aleppo, Sandwith was appointed to an unpaid Vice Consul post in Aintab and soon after to the additional post in Marash (Gaziantep and Kahramanmaras in modern Turkey). He served in these two isolated posts, which had never before had a resident British representative, until 1861 when he was appointed to the salaried Vice Consul post in Haifa. But before he could take it up, he was diverted to spend eight months working for the British representative on the International Commission the West European countries had forced on the Ottoman government following the massacre of Christians in Damascus in 1860. There followed six months as Acting Consul in Damascus (where he received the Prince of Wales on his Middle Eastern tour), so that he reached Haifa only in summer 1862, destined to spend three years there. Haifa was then a tiny port on the Syrian coast and life there was lonely. He added some Arabic to the Turkish he had already learnt fluently (he also had French and Italian and later became fluent in Modern Greek), reported on political events and on the economy and had to deal with tricky issues arising from rebellious tribespeople. Together with some months supporting the Consul General in Beirut, Sandwith's eight years in Syria gave him unusually wide experience and he impressed his superiors enough to be appointed to the much more important post of Vice Consul in Cyprus in 1865.

Sandwith served five years as Vice Consul in Cyprus at a time when the island mattered little to Britain. He reported on political events and the economy, and sometimes made severe comments about the quality of the local Ottoman administration. He also played an important part in opening up archaeology on the island, described below.

Promoted to Consul, Sandwith was in Crete from 1870 to 1885. It was the longest post he held and the one in which he made his most significant impact. His reports paint a detailed and important picture of the islands over these years. The island had a history of turbulence, most recently in a rising against the ruling Ottomans 1866 to 1869 and became caught up in the Balkan crisis of 1875 to 1878. In the months after the Treaty of Berlin in summer 1878 Crete teetered on the brink of another rising. Had it occurred, it would have had a major impact on both the island and on international relations. It was at Sandwith's suggestion that, working hand in hand with the British Ambassador in Constantinople, he brokered an agreement between the local Ottoman authorities and the Cretan Christian leaders that resulted in the Pact of Halepa in October 1878. The agreement secured another two decades peace for the island. It earned Sandwith the thanks of the Foreign Secretary, Lord Salisbury, and the Companionship of the Order of the Bath.

In 1885, Sandwith was suddenly transferred to be Consul in Tunisia, which had recently become a French protectorate. He was by now a senior and experienced Consul. Anglo-French relations at the time were at a low ebb, especially following Britain's invasion of Egypt in 1882, and local relation in Tunisia were especially soured. It fell to Sandwith to help put them back on an even keel, working with successive French officials, whilst at the same time upholding Britain's interests and those of a large and somewhat disputatious British community. He was able successfully to balance the various pressures and left with the respect of the French, the local British community, and the Foreign Office, which promoted him to Consul General in 1888 and posted him to Odessa.

Although Sandwith's consular district was his largest yet - the modern Ukraine and large areas beyond it – but this, his final post, turned out to be an anti-climax. He found he was no longer a political officer; southern Russia raised no special issues that affected Anglo-Russian relations, which the Ambassador handled in St Petersburg. The basic consular duties were not exacting. He found the salary (effectively reduced by the exchange rate) inadequate. The only new issue was British concern about Russian ambitions in central Asia, and it fell to him and his team to submit frequent reports on military activities. At one point he recruited a clandestine agent to tell him about ship movements in the harbour at Odessa. But even this work was pretty straightforward. The one issue that greatly exercised him was official Russian policy and public attitudes towards the Jewish community, on which he sent highly critical reports to London. He decided to retire on reaching sixty. The actual date was determined by the death in 1891 in Britain of his second daughter, aged seventeen. He was further disappointed to find his pension was less than he had expected.

== Archaeology ==
Sandwith's interests were not confined to diplomacy. In two posts – Cyprus and Crete – he engaged in the areas' archaeology and in both he left his mark.

During his time in Cyprus, he amassed a large collection of Cypriot antiquities, through his colleagues such as Luigi Palma di Cesnola, Robert Hamilton Lang and Demetrios Pierides who were conducting excavations throughout the island. He is notable for publishing the first attempt at a typology of Cypriot pottery in a paper delivered at the Society of Antiquaries of London in 1871 and was later published the journal Archaeologia (vol. 45). His typology was divided into four classes, class III corresponded to the Iron Age. He described the fabric and decoration of each type and recorded some of the distinctive shapes, but he never attempted to label the different fabrics or offer a typo-chronology of Cypriot pottery.

In 1869, the British Museum purchased 52 artefacts from his Cypriot collection, while he donated some additional items in 1870. Some of the artefacts were exhibited at the Fine Arts section of the Yorkshire Exhibition of Arts and Manufactures in Leeds in 1875 and later sold to the Leeds Literary and Philosophical Society, the Edinburgh Museum of Science and Art (now the National Museum of Scotland), as well as a number of other museums. In 1884, his brother Henry donated Cypriot items to the Cawthorne Village Museum outside of Barnsley in South Yorkshire. Additionally, part of his Cypriot collection was acquired by Augustus Franks and also came under the possession of the British Museum through the latter's bequest in 1917.

Sandwith continued to collect in Crete. He sold some antiquities to the British Museum and other collections; a few others he kept. He sold his large collection of Cretan embroidery and lace to the South Kensington Museum (now the Victoria & Albert Museum) where it formed the core of the Museum's Greek textile collection; those items that he kept were donated in 1975 by his granddaughter to the Historical Archives of Crete. He was early to recognise that Knossos must be an important site and tried, but failed, to persuade the British Museum to excavate there twenty years before Arthur Evans. He secured the transfer to the British Museum of a large pithos – which turned out to be the first Minoan object in the Museum's collection from a recorded excavation in Crete. He later acquired a seventeenth-century Cretan icon, now also in the British Museum.

== Personal life ==
Sandwith was married in December 1865, shortly before going to Cyprus. He and his wife had five children: the eldest, a son born in late 1866 in Cyprus, died as an infant in 1868; the second, also a son, was born in 1869 in Britain; his other three children were born in Crete – two daughters in 1871 and 1874 and a son in 1872. His wife subsequently suffered from ill health, and they increasingly led separate lives, she in Britain and he at his successive posts.

== Retirement and death ==
Sandwith spent his retirement quietly in Hove, London and, from 1898, in Surrey. He suffered a further tragedy when, ten months after the death of his daughter, his second son and oldest surviving child died of disease serving with the Army in India. He was active in local church affairs, for he never lost his faith; he followed world affairs and occasionally wrote to The Times; he pursued his charitable instincts, helping raise funds for refugees, selling some ancient Cretan antiquities for charity, and directing in his will that he had only a simple coffin and no tombstone, the £20-£25 thereby saved to be given to a hospital. He twice went on foreign trips with his surviving daughter. The diary he wrote on the first on the Nile in 1893 has been published; see Bibliography below. The second was to Crete and North Africa in 1895. He died in April 1900 after a road accident: out riding his recently acquired bicycle, he fell off when avoiding road works and was run over by a horse and cart.

== Conclusion ==
Sandwith's career tells us much about the British consular service in the Levant from the mid-nineteenth century. He exemplified the kind of person whom the Foreign Office increasingly wanted to represent the country abroad: British, not born in the Levant, as had once been the case; well-educated, able to acquire the languages of the region and to engage effectively with the Foreign Office, Ambassadors and officials of other governments as befitted a confident country that pursued a robust foreign policy throughout the region. His role shows how consuls in the Ottoman Empire were not just concerned with trade, protection and other traditional consular tasks but were very much political officials, reporting on issues that could directly affect foreign policy on the 'Eastern Question', and sometimes agents in the exercise of that policy; the contrast with his role when he moved to Odessa is striking. He became one of the British so-called 'Consular Collectors' in the nineteenth-century Levant, thereby showing that though his posts could be very demanding, they were not always so. At a more personal level, he experienced the loneliness and isolation that was sometimes the lot of Levant consuls, as he did too the sudden transfers between posts, moved by the Foreign Office without prior consultation and usually without reference to the Ambassador.

== Publications ==
- On the different styles of pottery found in ancient tombs in the island of Cyprus: read may 4th, 1871. London, 1877.

== Bibliography ==
- Stephen Boys Smith, Thomas Sandwith: A British Consul in the Levant, 1855-1891, The Isis Press, Istanbul, 2020. (This book contains the material and cites the sources on which this entry is largely based.)
- Stephen Boys Smith, "Two Months on the Nile: Thomas Sandwith's Nineteenth-Century Egyptian Journey", I B Tauris/Bloomsbury, London, 2025.
- Stephen Boys Smith, Thomas Sandwith, Oxford Dictionary of National Biography, www.oxforddnb.com
- Stephen Boys Smith, "Thomas Sandwith: a consul's view of mid-nineteenth-century Cyprus" in ed. Mehemt Demiryürek, Stephen Boys Smith, Michalis N Michael, Ali Efdal Özkul, Studies on Ottoman Nicosia: From the Ottoman Conquest to the Early British Period, The Isis Press, Istanbul, 2019.
- R S Merrillees, "T B Sandwith and the beginnings of Cypriot archaeology", in ed. V Tatton-Brown, Cyprus in the 19th century AD: fact, fancy and fiction, Oxbow Books, Oxford, 2001.

== See also ==
- Cypriot Pottery
