= Thrasyvoulos Manos =

Greek major general who led forces in the Greco-Turkish War of 1897

- Θρασύβουλος Μάνος
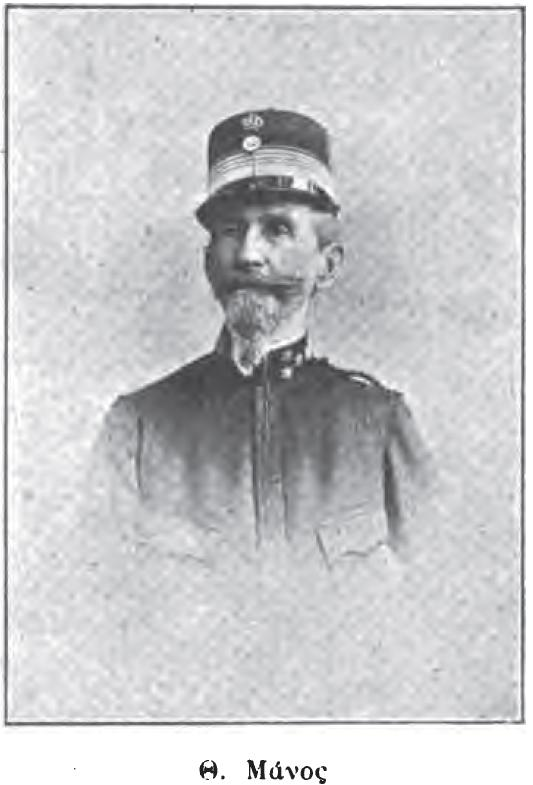
- Thrasyvoulos Manos c. 1894
- Born: 16 November 1835; Nafplio, Kingdom of Greece
- Died: 1922 (aged 86–87); Athens, Kingdom of Greece
- Alma mater: Hellenic Military Academy
- Spouse: Roxanne Mavromichalis
- Children: Konstantinos Manos; Petros Manos
- Relatives: Caradja family Soutzos family Aspasia Manos (Granddaughter)
- Military career
- Allegiance: Kingdom of Greece
- Branch: Hellenic Army
- Service years: ?–1918
- Rank: Major General
- Conflicts: 23 October 1862 Revolution; Cretan revolt (1866–1869); Battle of Vafe (WIA) (POW); Greco-Turkish War (1897)

Thrasyvoulos Manos (Greek: Θρασύβουλος Μάνος, 1835–1922) was an officer, later Major general of the Hellenic Army.

== Early life and ancestry ==
Born in 1835, into the Manos family, an old Phanariot family, as the son of the poet, writer and philosopher Konstatinos Manos (1785-1835) and his wife, Sevastia Argyropoulos (1806-1883). His father was the grandson of Nicholas Caradja, Prince of Wallachia, while his mother was the granddaughter of Michael Drakos Soutzos, Prince of Moldavia, which made him descendant of the rulers of Danubian principalities.

== Military career ==
He entered the Hellenic Military Academy and graduated as an artillery officer. He joined the Cretan uprising of 1866 as a volunteer, but was wounded and taken prisoner by the Ottomans at the battle of Vafe. He was brought to Constantinople, but managed to escape and return to Greece.

== Greco-Turkish war ==
During the Greco-Turkish War of 1897, he led the Greek forces in the Epirus front. After the war he was accused of negligence and blamed for the poor performance of Greek troops, but was exonerated and published an account of the campaign.

== Retirement and death ==
He retired with the rank of major general on 29 January 1918, and died in Athens in 1922.

== Personal life ==
In September 1868 in Paris, he was married to Roxane Mavromichalis (1848-1905). They had:

- Konstantinos Manos (1869–1913), Greek politician and a poet
- Petros Manos (1871-1918), Aide-de-camp of King Constantine I, father of Aspasia Manos, the consort of King Alexander of Greece and the grandfather of Queen Alexandra of Yugoslavia.
