= Cretan Gendarmerie =

Cretan Gendarmerie Κρητική Χωροφυλακή

Agency overview
- Formed: 1899
- Dissolved: 1913
- Superseding agency: Hellenic Gendarmerie

Jurisdictional structure
- Operations jurisdiction: Cretan State

The Cretan Gendarmerie (Greek: Κρητική Χωροφυλακή) was a gendarmerie force created under the Cretan State, after the island of Crete gained autonomy from Ottoman rule in the late 19th century. It later played a major role in the coup that toppled the government of King Constantine in 1916, and also in the World War II Battle of Crete and the Greek Resistance that followed.

== The police in Crete before autonomy ==
During the second half of the 19th century the Christian Cretans revolted almost every decade against Ottoman rule. In 1878, in an agreement known as the Pact of Halepa, the Sultan Abdul Hamid II, agreed that in future Crete would be policed by native-born Cretans, Christian and Muslim. It was agreed that a new body of Gendarmerie would be formed and recruited only from Cretans.

In 1889, however, there was a breakdown of law and order on the island which gave the Sultan the chance to land large numbers of troops on the island and to ignore the undertakings contained in the Pact of Halepa, although he never formally renounced it. The Sultan appointed Colonel Tahsin as chief of police in Crete at the head of a body of two hundred men recruited in Macedonia. In 1896, law and order again broke down in Crete and a final Christian insurrection against Ottoman rule took place. Under pressure from foreign powers, Abdul Hamid agreed to the creation of a body of one hundred Montenegrin constables under the command of the British Major Bor. These men remained on the island until February 1899 and were generally regarded as an effective force, although their numbers were not proportionate to the problems of the island. In 1898, the Muslim population of Heraklion, who had been enduring intolerable conditions for nearly two years, revolted against the British force there and killed eighteen British soldiers and several hundred Cretan Christians. This led directly to the end of Ottoman rule on the island as Britain and other Great Powers tried to force the Turkish authorities to withdraw from the island by the middle of November 1898. Prince George of Greece, the second son of the King of Greece, arrived on 21 December 1898 as High Commissioner appointed by the Great Powers to rule Crete, which was now de facto autonomous, although under Ottoman suzerainty. The Prince replaced one of the earliest examples of international rule in European history. After the collapse of Ottoman rule in much of the island in February 1897, a committee of admirals of four of the Great Powers (Britain, France, Russia, and Italy) had run the coastal sections and immediate hinterland of the island. The British administered the prefecture of Heraklion, the Russians the prefecture of Rethymno, the French the prefecture of Lasithi and Sitia, and the Italians the prefectures of Chania and Sfakia.

The public safety situation on the island was far from ideal. Normal law and order had disappeared with the collapse of Ottoman administration and almost all adult males were armed, and apart from the national problems there were also personal feuds and endemic problems, such as cattle stealing and vendettas. Many people abandoned the countryside and flocked to the cities for protection. The foreign governors were forced to organize units of gendarmerie from Cretans to supplement their own police and military forces, and a separate force was formed in each prefecture. Naturally, the organization and system of operation of every one of these units was different and reflected the national origins of the governor. As a result, Crete was policed by four independent units of Gendarmerie, which were organised on completely different models.

== The foundation and organization of the Cretan Gendarmerie ==
Postcard from ca. 1900 showing Cretan gendarmes with a Carabiniere instructor

When Prince George of Greece undertook his duties as High Commissioner, one of his fundamental objectives was to restore law and order. He wanted to prove to everyone that Cretans were worthy of autonomy. So it was decided that all residents should be disarmed and a central body of Gendarmerie should be created. The core of the new Cretan Gendarmerie were the small units that the powers had created.

In January 1899 the Prince called the commanders of the four Gendarmerie units to Chania to hear their proposals on the way the Cretan Gendarmerie should be organized. At this meeting it was realized that the only commander who was expert and had serious proposals on the subject was the Italian representative. Thus, the Italian proposal was accepted and it was decided on the organization of a unit of gendarmerie similar to the Italian Carabinieri, which was considered one of the best such units in Europe.

In the summer of 1899, Carabinieri Captain Federico Craveri was named commander and organizer of the new Cretan Gendarmerie. Craveri, with the help of a team of 140 Carabinieri officers and non-commissioned officers, undertook the organization of the new force, using as a core the personnel of the four forces created by the international governors. In the achievement of this objective he was helped by two particularly favourable factors.

First, was that many young Cretans, inspired by love for their country, hurried to enlist in this new paramilitary unit of the independent Cretan State. This meant that Craveri could choose the best. Enlistment in the Gendarmerie, which also had military duties (the foundation of Militia having been postponed permanently due to lack of funds), was considered an honorable service to the nation. Georgios Vouros, for example, abandoned his studies in the Law Faculty of Athens University in order to enlist as a simple constable, and Evangelos Sarris, who had previously abandoned his studies in order to participate in the revolution of 1898, immediately enlisted in the Gendarmerie. Both were later to be among the first Cretans commissioned into the Gendarmerie.

The other factor that helped Craveri to enforce law and order in the island was his excellent relationship with the government and Prince George, as well as the fact that the island's authorities had the right to deport all persons who were considered dangerous. This measure was initially applied by the international authorities and the constitution of 1899 and was extended for two years as a privilege of the Prince. None of the people deported by the admirals or the Prince had the right to return to Crete unless the Prince decided so.

=== Organization and uniform ===
The Cretan Gendarmerie consisted of a single battalion of five companies. Although the official establishment was 1,600, under Italian command the total was never more than 1,275. One company was assigned to each nomos (prefecture). The company commanders were Carabinieri lieutenants, who in Crete were given the local rank of captain. In June 1900 Craveri was replaced by Luigi Balduini Caprini, who created a sixth headquarters company. The first company commanders were: Ferdinando Mensitieri (HQ Company), Luigi Bassi (Chania Company), Ettore Lodi (Sfakia Company), Arcangelo de Mandate (Heraklion Company), Edigio Garrone (Rethymno Company), and Filiberto Vigliani (Lasithi Company).

Each company was divided into three or four ypomoirarchies (subcompanies), each also under the command of an officer. Each ypomoirarchia had six enomoties (stations) commanded by a non-commissioned officer. Initially all officers and non-commissioned officers were Italian Carabinieri, but gradually the non-commissioned officers were replaced by Cretans. The Cretans, many of whom were well educated, were promoted rapidly after three months training at a military school operating at the headquarters, at the end of which they took examinations. Some of the Italian officers slightly changed their signatures to look Greek: Luigi Balduini Caprini, for instance, signed himself "Kaprinis".

The uniform was dark blue in winter and white in summer. The constables wore the traditional Cretan vraka (voluminous breeches) and the officers wore trousers. The constables wore a round hat and the officers wore a kepi similar to that worn by officers of the Greek Army. Both officers and constables wore black boots. The constables were armed with rifle, bayonet, and revolver, while some also carried the traditional Cretan knife on their belts.

== The Cretan Gendarmerie in an autonomous Crete ==
The Gendarmerie was busy upholding the public order, struggling against brigands and also performing services as saving people from drowning in the harbour of Chania.

In a very short period of time, the Cretan Gendarmerie managed to gain the trust of the Cretans and the foreigners, although the latter had initially been prejudiced against the Cretans..

During the Theriso Revolt, the Cretan Gendarmerie remained loyal to Prince George and fought against the rebels, aided by a Russian expeditionary corps. Those members of the Gendarmerie who had defected to the rebels were not included in the amnesty the rebels received later, but were allowed to leave for Greece.

== From the departure of Prince George until the Balkan Wars ==
On 16 December 1906 Eugenio Monaco, third and last head of the Italian mission, delivered command of the Gendarmerie to Artillery Lieutenant Colonel Andreas Momferratos, head of the Greek mission. The first objective of the Greek mission was the creation of a militia and the equipping of the Gendarmerie with new rifles of the Mannlicher–Schönauer type. They also tried to introduce more intensive military education. The creation of battalions of militia released the Gendarmerie from certain military duties.

The Greek mission immediately began to promote of Cretans to commissioned officer rank. The first Cretans to be commissioned as lieutenants on 14 January 1907, in order of seniority, were: Evangelos Sarris, Dimitrios Kokkalas, Andreas Androulakis, Alexandros Hatzioannou, Nikiforos Nikiforakis, Zaharias Brillakis, Ilias Mourginakis, Minos Mylogiannakis, Emannouil Vogiatzakis, Georgios Vouros, and Ioannis Souris.

On the eve of the Balkan Wars in 1912 there were 45 officers, 50 senior non-commissioned officers, and 1,371 junior non-commissioned officers and constables serving in the Cretan Gendarmerie. Of the officers, five second lieutenants were physicians and one a pharmacist, while another pharmacist was a senior NCO.

Some of the officers were attached from the Greek Army, including the commander, Colonel Andreas Momferratos. Army officers constituted the entire Greek mission that replaced the Italians in December 1906.

As a direct result of the Cretan Gendarmerie's success in its duties, the organization of the Greek Gendarmerie was also assigned to Italian officers in July 1911. Some of them, like Arcangelo de Mandate, had also participated in the organization of the Cretan Gendarmerie.

== The Balkan Wars ==
On 4 October 1912 the Christian countries of the Balkans (Bulgaria, Greece, Montenegro and Serbia) declared war on the Ottoman Empire. The advance of the Greek Army was rapid and on 26 October the Turks surrendered Thessaloniki (Salonika). Eleftherios Venizelos, forecasting the problems of law and order that would be presented after the liberation of the city and knowing that the Bulgarians and other European nations would like to promote a picture of chaos and a Greek state incapable of imposing order, ordered Cretan Gendarmerie units to be transported to the city.

Thus, on 24 October 1912 the commander of the Cretan Gendarmerie with four officers, two senior non-commissioned officers and 150 constables left from Chania for Athens and thence to Thessaloniki aboard the steamer Arcadi. This force was strengthened and eventually almost the whole of the Gendarmerie was shipped to Thessaloniki. On the 14 October 1912, the Governor-General of Crete Stefanos Dragoumis mobilised the reservist non-commissioned officers and constables enlisted in the 1880s and 1890s.

Thessalonica was then an international city. Apart from the Greeks, it was also inhabited by many Turks and Western Europeans, a very large Jewish community, and a substantial Bulgarian minority. Most of them did not welcome the Greek flag flying over the city. The Western Europeans considered that they would lose their commercial privileges; the Jews for commercial reasons would have preferred an Austrian administration or the internationalization of Thessalonica; whilst the Bulgarians, Turks and Austrians wanted the city for their own countries. The composition of population in the city of Thessalonica, according to Turkish authorities a short time before its liberation, was:

- Jews - 61,000
- Turks - 43,000
- Greeks - 40,000
- Bulgarians - 6,000
- Other nationalities - 5,000

The reader should notice that the population of the suburbs and the rural area around Thessaloniki was almost 100% Greek. However, to these numbers of permanent citizens there should also be added others. Because of the war the population of the city almost had been doubled. Also present were the Greek army, the Bulgarian army, gangs of Komitadji (Bulgarian irregulars), the crews of British, Russian, Austrian and French warships that were in Thessalonica in order to protect their nationals, and the Turkish troops, who according to the treaty had freedom of movement. There were also the Turkish Gendarmerie and police, who according to the treaty were not disarmed, and a large number of Turkish deserters, many of them also armed, who were wandering the streets begging for food and money. Finally, there were Muslim refugees who had been gathering in the city as a result of Bulgarian atrocities against the unarmed population. These were assembled in Panes, cemeteries and squares creating unacceptable hygiene conditions and the immediate danger of a spread of epidemics in the city.

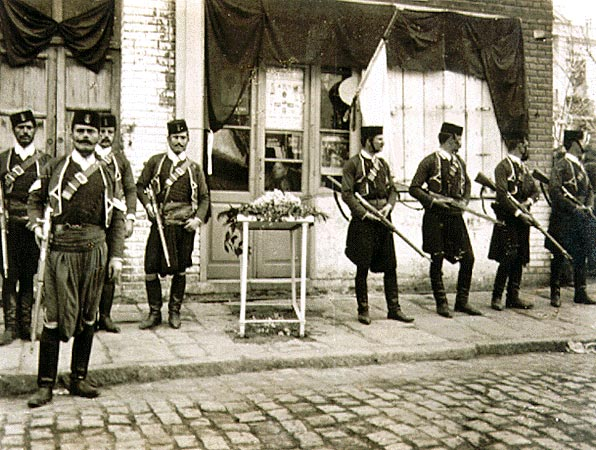
Cretan Gendarmes patrolling the streets of Thessaloniki in 1912

The British correspondent of The Times, Crawford Price, reported: "Eloquent proof of the size and gravity of the Turkish defeat lies in the thousands of the refugees, who come to Salonika like swarms of locusts. Terrified and panicked leave to save their lives from the Servo-Bulgarian advance...ask shelter and protection from the cold behind walls and wear various rags...One can see pregnant women lying in the mud, and the complete absence of all elementary sanitary precaution, and not having a single blanket...one can see women and children starving not having a single piece of bread."

The policing of the city was very difficult, with a varied population, with explosive racial and religious prejudices, with the economic problems that were created by the change of rule, with the consequences of the recent battles, but also with the lack of any infrastructure for solving these problems.

Initially, the Cretan Gendarmerie took care of the refugees by organizing them in settlements in the suburbs of the city, thus allowing the municipal workers to clean the city. They then tried to create a climate of calm and order in the city, so that all the citizens, regardless of their nationality, could feel safe. The gendarmes immediately gained the confidence and admiration of population, as it appears from the following comments in newspapers and magazines on their actions in Thessalonica:

From the French paper L' Illustration, in an article by the military correspondent Jean Len: "There is something that occasionally draws the attention of the crowd. The passage of a Cretan Gendarmerie patrol, dressed in their national uniform: boots, vraka, shirt and toca hat on their heads. They are handsome men with dark hair, tall with a steady step...pride lights their faces. What a dream they live, these man who were for so long the captives of the Turks in their poor island, when they realize that they are entrusted to keep order in Thessalonica which they liberated from the Turks and which is still inhabited by so many of the previous conquerors, who now have to obey them! The presence of this Gendarmerie might calm the Bulgarian soldiers a little. Every evening they drink too much, creating problems wherever they pass."

From Morning of Thessalonica: "The Cretan Gendarmes impose equally the law on civilians, partisans and soldiers, regardless of race or religion, everybody obeys to everything they impose, because everyone respects and fears them."

From New Truth of Thessalonica: "The Cretan Policeman – man of duty, disciplined and decent, managed from the first days to impose order...So in a short period of time Thessalonica had the fortune to see a peace and order that during the last years of Turkish occupation could not even be dreamt of. What men, what great lads. How handsome, decent and strong these Cretan Gendarmes...There is not soil in the world able to give birth to men better and braver than Cretans."

From Time of Athens (C. Chairopoulos): "Excellent in their carriage, discipline, organization, every man chosen with the serious sight of American or British policemen, they patrol the city inspiring respect in all citizens regardless of nationality. Trained well, military by nature, brave of character, strengthened by exercise, they are a formidable force."

From Time of Moscow: "Unfortunately not all countries have the brave men of Crete in order to create such a Gendarmerie."

The Bulgarians did not cease their efforts to make Thessalonica seem like a city in anarchy or to make it appear that they were also in control. On the night of 31 October, only five days after the liberation, a group of Bulgarian irregulars blew up a big Turkish ammunition dump in the suburb of Zeitelik. As a result, some Turkish prisoners and a few Greek cavalry troopers were killed. Soon afterwards, the Bulgarian irregulars started lighting fires and slaughtering the Turkish non-combatants. The Cretan gendarmes attacked them and forced them to stop their actions and retreat to the Bulgarian army barracks to seek protection.

This was the first in a series of incidents involving the Bulgarians. In the following days they started occupying mosques and turning them into Bulgarian churches, insulting the religious feelings of the Muslim citizens, who protested to the Greek authorities. The Cretan Gendarmerie, with the help of the Greek Army, intervened to protect the Muslims. Most of these mosques had been converted from Greek Orthodox churches when the Turks first captured the city five centuries before.

In another case, Ipenomotarchis John Petrakis, who with ten other gendarmes was guarding the railway station, discovered a Bulgarian plot to blow up the station. He arrested the Bulgarians and confiscated 100 kilograms of gunpowder and some rifles. Elsewhere, the French post office was closed after a Bulgarian officer shot the clerks because they would not accept Bulgarian banknotes.

According to the report of the French military correspondent Jean Len, the whole population of Thessalonica disliked the Bulgarians. The only exception was the Jewish community, which initially, following the orders of the Austrian counsellor, gave to the Bulgarian army buildings that they refused to give to the Greek Army. Later, however, the Jewish community changed their point of view

== Capture of Bulgarian units in Thessalonica ==
On 17 June 1913 the Bulgarians, without any declaration of war, attacked the Greek Army. The Second Division and the Cretan Gendarmerie were given the task of neutralising the Bulgarian units in Thessalonica. The Cretan Gendarmerie was ordered to capture the various small Bulgarian units scattered around the city, while the Second Division was to capture the larger units of Bulgarian Army.

Later the same day General Kallaris sent the following message to the commander of Bulgarian forces in Thessalonica :

Sir,

Since Bulgarian troops began hostilities in the countryside against our Army, I have the honour to request you to leave the city of Thessalonica one hour after the delivery of this letter.

The arms of your men must be delivered to our officers, while your officers may keep their swords. A train will transport your men to the front and measures will be taken to allow them to safely pass the front line. After this deadline expires I must, to my regret, give orders that your troops will be considered hostile.

As expected, the Bulgarians ignored the ultimatum and plans for their disarmament were initiated. The operations began in the afternoon of the same day and lasted until the morning of the next day.

Bulgarian units were located in the Rotunda, in the building of the Faculty of Public Employees, in the church of Saint Sofia, in the buildings along the Hamidiye road, in the Turkish school on Kassandrou Street, and inside the Ioannidios School. The Bulgarian headquarters were located in a large house that belonged to the banker Samouel Mouson.

Soldiers and Cretan gendarmes encircled the Public Employees building and firing from the houses opposite forced the Bulgarians to surrender. The Bulgarian units that were located in the buildings on Hamidiye road surrendered after a hard battle. Gendarmes and soldiers positioned in the houses opposite continued firing at them until the Bulgarians surrendered. The bullet holes in the facades of the buildings could still be seen until their destruction during the earthquake of 20 June 1978.

In the Turkish school Ticaret Mectebi on Kassandrou Road and in the Bulgarian consulate there were about one hundred Bulgarian irregulars (komitadjis), who were used to attack the Greek headquarters. The komitadjis were always causing problems, walking provocatively in the streets, and they often attacked Turkish refugees housed nearby. On the afternoon of 17 June a unit of gendarmes commanded by Ypenomotarchis Emmanuel Tsakonas encircled the building and called on the Bulgarians to surrender. When they refused, heavy firing began that lasted into the next morning. Then Tsakonas resorted to a trick. He entered the courtyard of the school carrying a "bomb" and threatened to blow up the building unless they surrendered in one hour. The Bulgarians surrendered without realising that the supposed bomb was actually a bottle of mineral water.

Lieutenant Hatzioannou with his unit attacked, neutralised and arrested the guard of the Bulgarian post office and bank in the Grant hotel.

The fighting was hard in Saint Sofia, where sergeant Avatzos's unit had the task of capturing the Bulgarians who were holed up in the church. At one point in the battle the Bulgarians raised a white flag. As soon as the Cretans advanced in order to arrest them the Bulgarians started firing again, wounding two gendarmes. Then the Cretans assaulted with fixed bayonets and captured all the surviving Bulgarians.

At the Roman monument of Rotunda, the Greek soldiers, taking positions in the terraces of the surrounding houses and aided by many citizens, fired at the tents of the Bulgarians located in the courtyard and against the windows of Rotunda until they surrendered.

In total, 1,300 Bulgarian soldiers were arrested, including seventeen officers and General Hesapsiev, who was transported aboard the steamer Marietta Rialdi to Piraeus, where he was held until the end of war.

== After the Balkan Wars ==
In July 1913 the Cretan Gendarmerie was incorporated into the Greek Gendarmerie. However the majority of its personnel remained in Macedonia, and the distinctive uniform was retained. In 1914 a "Battalion of Gendarmerie of the Expeditionary Army" was created, consisting of four companies, mainly reservist gendarmes of the Cretan Gendarmerie.

Unfortunately, peace did not last long. On 22 September 1915, ignoring Greek neutrality, Allied forces occupied Thessaloniki to further their plans for a Macedonian front. In December 1915 Italian and French forces occupied the Greek island of Corfu, where they gathered the remnants of the Serbian Army and Government.

King Constantine wanted to keep Greece neutral and did not wish to participate in a war that might end in economic and/or military disaster for Greece. After all, Greece had doubled its territories after the Balkan Wars. The soldiers wanted to return at their homes and there were many economic problems as a result of the Army's mobilisation. Also many Greeks were angry with the Italians and French, who after the Balkan Wars did not support the Greek claims on the liberated lands of Macedonia and Northern Epirus.

On the other hand, Prime Minister Eleftherios Venizelos believed that Greece had an obligation to help Serbia and enter the war with the Allies against the Central Powers. The main thrust of his policy was that Greece, as a maritime nation, should always follow Britain's lead. He hoped that Greece again had the chance to liberate the many Greeks still living under Turkish rule.

The King was accused of being pro-German due to his relationship to the Kaiser. However, he was also a cousin of the Tsar and the British King.

By the end of 1915 it was obvious that neutrality could not be maintained and that Greek sovereignty was being eroded day by day. A group of influential Greek Macedonian citizens and officers, believing that the Allies may give Greek Macedonian grounds to the Serbs, decided on a coup d'etat in order to force King Constantine to abandon neutrality and enter the war in favour of the Allies. This group, the Committee of National Defence, was led by D. Ligas, Periklis Argyropoulos, Alexandros Zannas, K. Aggelakis, N. Manos, Pazis, Grekos, Pamikos Zymvrakakis, Th. Koutoupis and others. The leadership was offered to the now ex-Prime Minister Eleftherios Venizelos, who strongly believed that Greece should enter the war in favour of the Allies. Venizelos agreed on condition that military units should be committed on all fronts and not only in Macedonia.

In March 1916 the German and Bulgarian forces started occupying Greek territories in Eastern Macedonia and Thrace. Bulgarian forces, intent on expelling the Greek population from the area, started a campaign of terror, slaughtering civilians, burning villages, raping women and children, and robbing the population. The Germans objected to these atrocities, but did not wish to displease their allies too much. Once again refugees, Greeks this time, began flooding into Thessaloniki.

Cretans and other Greek soldiers who could not tolerate the occupation of Greek soil by the Bulgarian army started volunteering for the Allied armies in order to fight against the Central Powers. The Greek high command started transferring units from Thessaloniki to Southern Greece in order to maintain discipline and avoid provocative actions against the Allied forces who were in Thessaloniki.

== The National Defence coup d'état ==
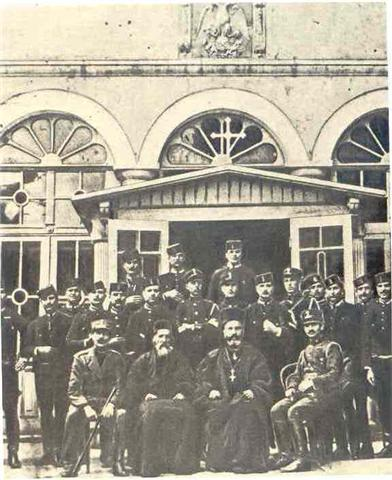
Cretan Gendarmes in the Ecumenical Patriarchate of Constantinople, November 1918.

On 21 May 1916, the day of King Constantine's name-day, the French forces of General Sarrail imposed martial law in Thessaloniki (despite British opposition), occupying the post office, the telegraph office, the telephone office, the railway facilities, the power station, and the gasworks.

Simultaneously they imposed censorship in the press, forcibly closed two newspapers and expelled five Greek officers with whom they considered that could not work: Colonel Troupakis, commanding the constabulary, Lieutenant-Colonel Nidriotis, commanding the police, Colonel Messalas, commanding Fortress Thessalonica, his chief of staff Lieutenant-Colonel Gouvelis, and Colonel Bouklakos, commanding the artillery.

Any form of Greek sovereignty in the Allied-occupied Greek territories had been eliminated. The French naval attaché Lieutenant-Commander de Rokfeill reported in September 1916: "There is not any question of concern for the sovereign rights of Greece because no-one remains in this country that has not been violated".

In April 1916 the new Serbian Army of 120,000 men was transported to the Macedonian front. Simultaneously the King of Serbia and his government arrived in Thessalonica. In this situation and with the danger that the Allies would proclaim Thessalonica capital of the Kingdom of Serbia, the Committee of National Defence on 17 August 1916 decided to mount their coup d'état. The representative of the Cretan Gendarmerie on this Committee was Captain D. Kokkalas. The decision was taken after General Sarrail threatened to nominate a Serbian prefect in Thessalonica and despite the possible objections of Venizelos. Afterwards the Committee of National Defence issued two proclamations, to the population and to the army.

Lieutenant-Colonel Konstantinos Mazarakis tried without success to convince the 11th Artillery Battalion to take part in the coup. But all army units remained loyal to the legal government and only individual officers and soldiers took part in the coup, mostly men from units of the IV Army Corps who had felt the humiliation of surrendering Greek lands to the Bulgarians without a fight.

The Cretan Gendarmerie, however, managed to overcome the loyal forces in Thessaloniki and to initiate the coup. Many of the Gendarmerie officers were already insiders in the conspiracy. After the declaration of the Committee of National Defence, the first Gendarmerie unit to revolt was the Second Company of Gendarmerie that was attached to the army, commanded by Second Lieutenant Emmanuel Tsakonas. This was followed by other companies of Cretan Gendarmerie, including the First Company (First Class Captain Evangelos Sarris), the Second Company (Captain Pavlides), and HQ Company (Major Panousopoulos). All officers and gendarmes of the Cretan Gendarmerie participated voluntarily at the coup. Even the Italian Lieutenant Farughi, still serving with the Gendarmerie, participated at the coup.

Cavalry Lieutenant-Colonel Zymvrakakis, who was a member of the National Defence Committee, undertook the leadership of the coup and led the troops to the general headquarters of the Allied forces. There he announced to General Sarraill that they wished to put themselves under his orders. The British officer Price C. Ward in his book The Story Of The Salonica Army wrote: "General Sarrail accepted their offer since he already had the habit of accepting Greek volunteers from the moment Bulgarians had entered Greece."

The only organised units that participated at the coup were the Cretan Gendarmerie and the volunteer battalion that was already under French orders. Alexandros Zannas, a member of the National Defence committee, wrote that "the situation was curious. We (the rebels) had occupied the city of Thessaloniki (17 August 1916) based only on the forces of the Cretan Gendarmerie."

Athinogenis, the prefect of Thessaloniki, and the assistant district attorney convinced the officers of the loyal troops not to try to suppress the rebels immediately. Then the rebels tried to surround the loyal units. Fortunately, the occasional firing only resulted in three dead and seven wounded. The next day French troops forced the loyal units to surrender. It was a tragic irony that the French bayonets that had created the conditions for a civil war with the occupation of Greek territories at this moment prevented one.

In the following days the coup was established in other Greek Macedonian cities, Crete and other islands, always with the help of Cretan Gendarmerie officers like Captain Vouros in Veria.
