= Theriso revolt =

1905 rebellion against the Ottoman-controlled government of Crete

Theriso Revolt
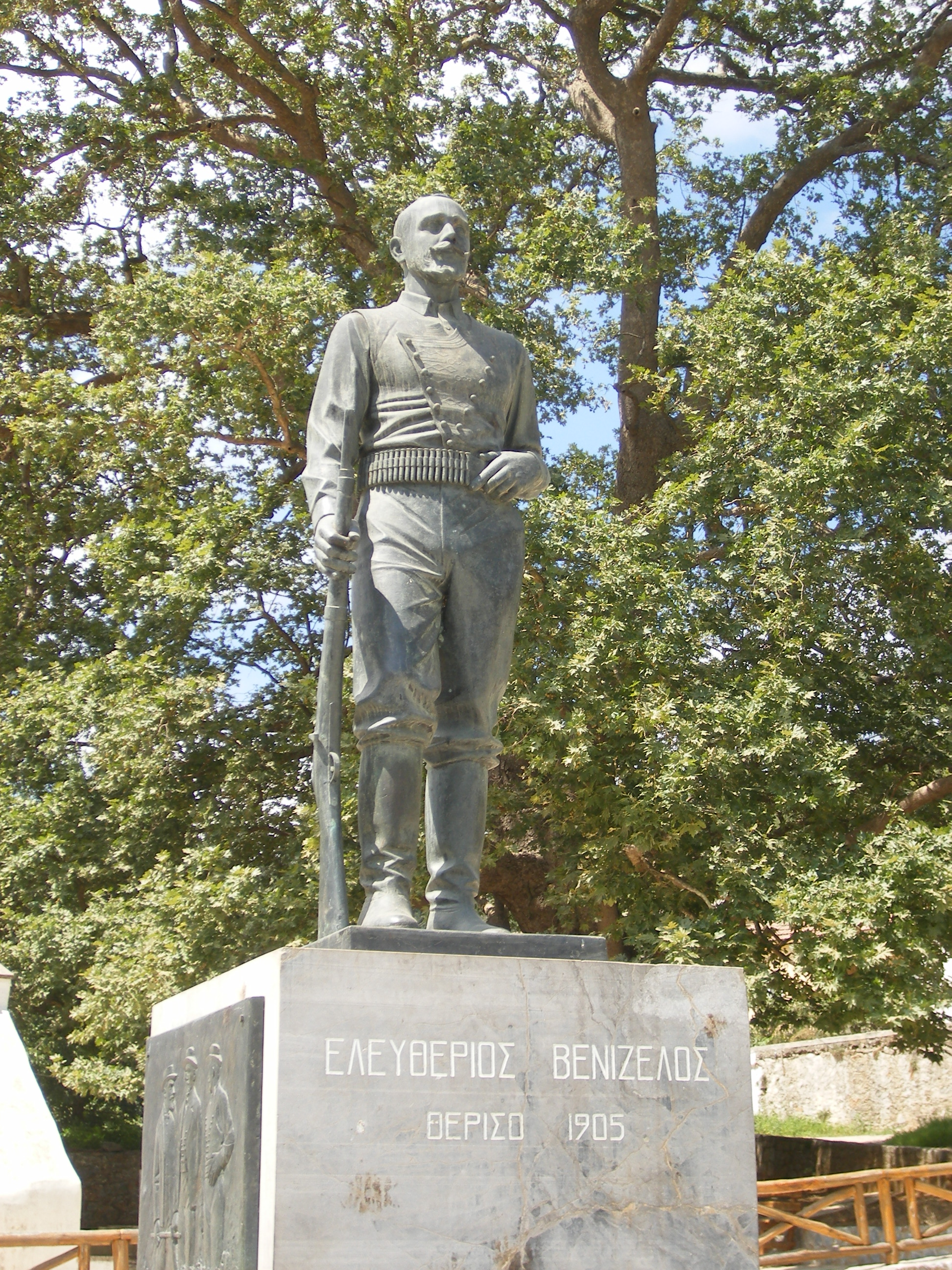
- Statue of Eleftherios Venizelos in the village of Theriso.
Date	23 March – 25 November 1905 (8 months and 2 days)
Location	Cretan State (now Greece)
Result	Resignation of Prince George; Change of political status on the island Union not achieved

Belligerents
(Greece) Cretan rebels	Cretan State; Military support: Russian Empire; Other support: British Empire; Greece

Commanders and leaders
(Greece) Eleftherios Venizelos; (Greece) Konstantinos Manos; (Greece) Konstantinos Foumis; (Greece) Aristeidis Stergiadis; (Greece) Ioannis Sfakianakis	(Cretan State) Prince George (surrendered); (Greece) Theodoros Deligiannis; (Russian Empire) Colonel Urbanovich

Units involved
	(Cretan State) Cretan Gendarmerie (Russian Empire) Imperial Guards (200)

Strength
1,500	(Cretan State) 1,100; (Russian Empire) 650

The Theriso revolt (Greek: Επανάσταση του Θερίσου, romanized: Epanástasi tou Therísou) was an insurrection that broke out in March 1905 against the government of Crete, then an autonomous state under Ottoman suzerainty. The revolt was led by the Cretan politician Eleftherios Venizelos, and is named after his mother's native village, Theriso, the focal point of the revolt.

The revolt stemmed from the dispute between Venizelos and the island's ruler, Prince George of Greece, over the island's future, particularly over the question of Cretan union with Greece. The conflict's origin can be traced to 1901, when Prince George dismissed Venizelos from the government. The hostility between Venizelos and the prince was precipitated by the latter's attitude toward foreign relations and by his refusal to engage in dialogue with his advisers over the island's internal affairs. After a prolonged political struggle, Venizelos and his followers decided upon an armed uprising, with the goals of uniting Crete with Greece and ushering in a more democratic government for the island.

The Theriso revolt not only established Venizelos as the leading politician in Crete, but also brought him to the attention of the wider Greek world. His reputation would lead in 1909 to his call to Greece, where he became Prime Minister.

== Context ==
=== Autonomous Crete ===
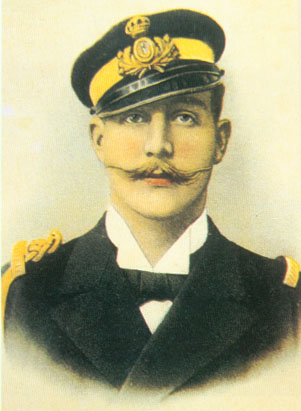
Prince George of Greece.

In 1897, a renewed revolt broke out in Crete, which had been under Ottoman domination since the mid-17th century. The island's Christian majority wished to join Greece, but the Great Powers (France, the United Kingdom, Russia, Germany, Italy and Austria-Hungary) were opposed to it. A compromise led to the creation of an autonomous state under Ottoman suzerainty, guaranteed by the presence of military contingents of the Powers. Prince George of Greece, the second son of King George I, was named High Commissioner. In turn, Prince George named Eleftherios Venizelos prime minister.

Disagreements soon emerged between the two men. Their first argument concerned the construction of a palace for Prince George. Shortly after his arrival on the island, the latter indicated his wish for a palace. Venizelos protested that a palace would be a symbol of permanence for a regime he intended to be temporary, while union with Greece was awaited. The offended prince eventually dropped his demand for a palace.

The principal source of contention between the Prince and Venizelos concerned their vision for the island's government. Although the chief author of the island's constitution (notably of articles guaranteeing individual liberties and equality between Christians and Muslims), Venizelos believed it was far too conservative and granted the Prince too much power. The Cretan assembly had few powers and only met once every two years. Moreover, ministers were in fact counselors to the prince, who alone could approve laws.

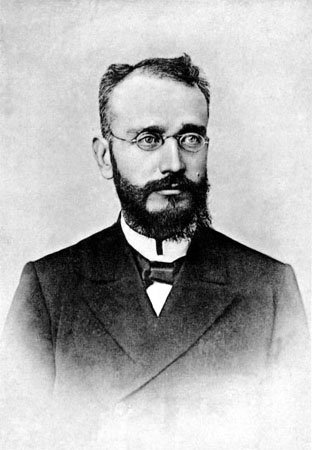
Eleftherios Venizelos

In foreign relations, Prince George alone was authorised to deal with the Great Powers, as illustrated by the absence of a foreign affairs minister. The Prince took responsibility for the matter of Greek annexation of the island and discussing the subject with the foreign ministers of Russia, France, Italy and Britain, without taking care to speak to his counselors. In the summer of 1900, when he was preparing to tour the European courts, the prince declared: "When I am travelling in Europe, I shall ask the Powers for annexation, and I hope to succeed on account of my family connections".

Venizelos thought union would be premature, especially as Cretan institutions were still unstable. He recommended instead the creation of a Cretan army, followed by the withdrawal of European troops. Once foreign control had diminished, then union with Greece could take place. However, this approach was dimly viewed by public opinion and the Athenian newspapers impatient for union to succeed.

=== Dismissal of Venizelos ===
In February 1901, the Powers refused to make any change to the island's status. Although this demonstrated the correctness of Venizelos' approach, something Prince George publicly admitted, it was the minister who endured attacks from the press.

Venizelos handed in his resignation on two occasions: first on 5 March 1901, citing health reasons, and then on 18 March, explaining that he could not work while in permanent disagreement with his colleagues and the High Commissioner. George refused to accept his resignation, instead preferring to dismiss him for insubordination. On 20 March, posters on the walls of Chania announced the Prince's dismissal of Venizelos.

After his departure, the newspapers launched an anti-Venizelos campaign. A series of articles possibly written by the Prince's secretary referred to him as the "insolent counselor", criticising his policies as anti-union, anti-dynastic and pro-Powers. After his dismissal, Venizelos withdrew from politics. However, in December 1901, he responded to the accusations by means of five articles in the newspaper Kyrix, prompting the Prince to throw his former minister in prison.

== Revolt ==
Venizelos next appeared on the public stage in the spring of 1905, when an insurrection against the Cretan government broke out. He was its leader, denouncing the corruption of Prince George's entourage and the ruler's inability to persuade the Great Powers to accept the idea of Crete's union with Greece. The Powers, especially Russia and Austria-Hungary, adamantly opposed union for fear it would disrupt the fragile political equilibrium in Europe, particularly in the Balkans. Additionally, they were unwilling to appease Greece, with its famously weak army and navy, at the expense of alienating Turkey.

During the Cretan Revolt (1897–1898) which led to the establishment of autonomy in Crete, Venizelos was a fervent proponent of union with Greece. However, during his premiership of the island, he envisioned autonomy, believing union would be premature. During his absence from power, Venizelos again changed his belief about the "Cretan Question". As in 1897, he thenceforth advocated union at all costs. Although absent from political life, he showed his support for the advocates of union (Enosis) during their demonstrations.

=== Theriso assembly ===
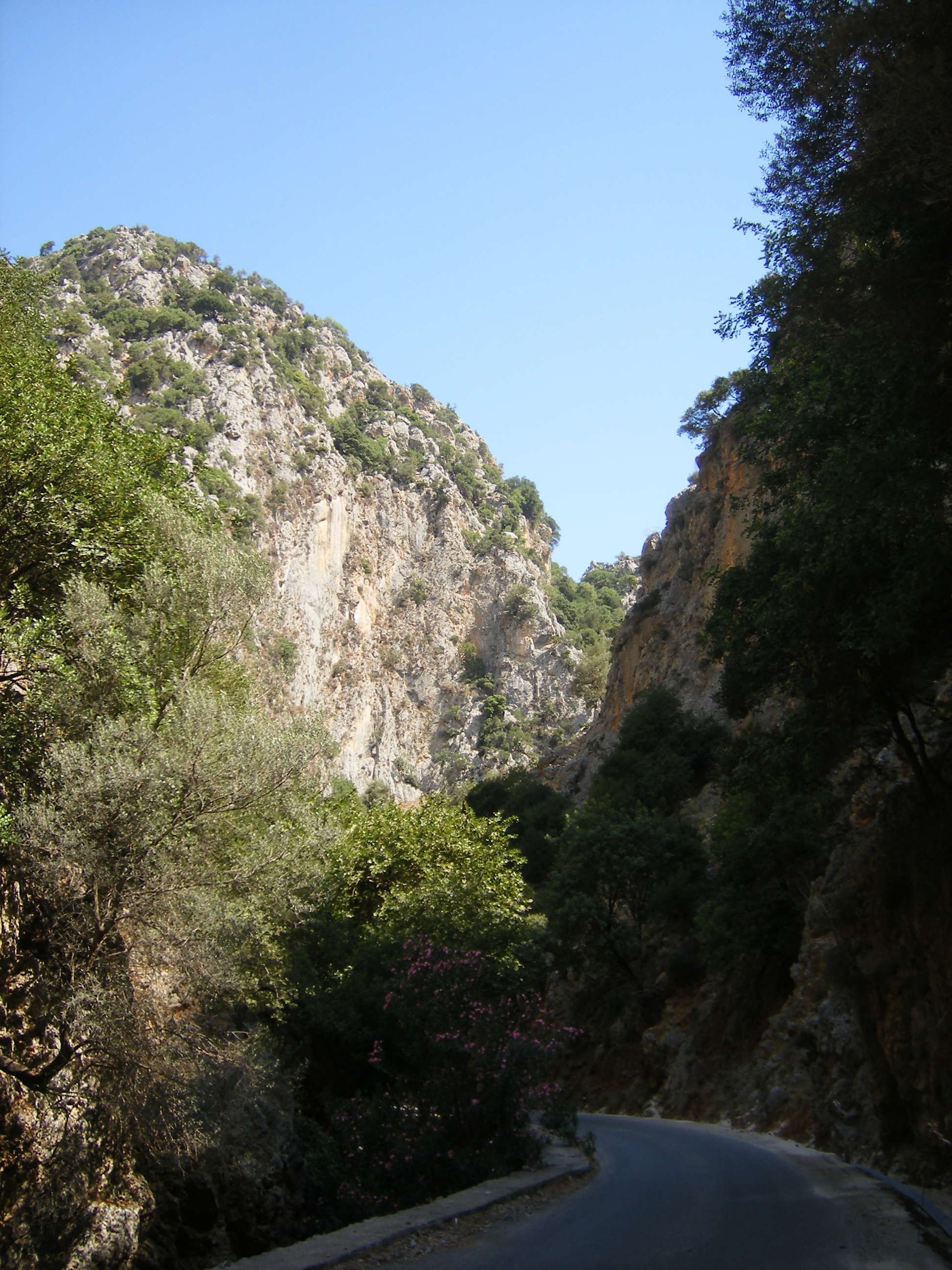
Gorges at Theriso. The road, which runs along the riverbed at the gorge's base, did not exist at the time of the revolt.

In February 1905, Venizelos organised an assembly at Theriso with a group of seventeen other Cretan leaders who became the core of his movement. At first they were joined by 300 armed Cretans who, although not posing a significant military threat, would prove very difficult to remove, hidden in the Theriso gorge. The impact of this act was important: within twenty days, some 7,000 sympathisers had flocked to Theriso. Venizelos chose the village of Theriso for its strategic position 14 km from Chania, its natural defenses at the foothills of the White Mountains, and its easy access to other villages and valleys around Chania, as well as toward Sfakia. The passage toward Theriso was defended by narrow gorges, easy for the insurgents to control. Moreover, these gorges concealed numerous grottoes and caverns that served as natural shelters for the insurgents who converged around Theriso. The village was already a symbol of resistance before 1905: in 1821, during the Greek War of Independence, several hundred Greeks there had routed an army of 21,000 Ottomans.

The rebellion broke out officially in broad daylight on 23 March [O.S. 10 March] 1905, when some 1,500 Cretans met at Theriso, which thenceforth became the centre of the revolt. Venizelos and other prominent critics of the Prince formed the core of the revolt, along with around a thousand men, of whom only half were armed. From the first moments, skirmishes took place between the gendarmerie and the rebels.

Aside from a general dissatisfaction with the Prince's authoritarian government, the assembled rebels fervently supported union with Greece. On the first day of the uprising, Venizelos declared that Enosis was impossible as long as Prince George remained the island's High Commissioner. The following declaration was approved by the insurgents and read in St. George's Church at Theriso on 10 March: "The Cretan people, meeting in a general assembly at Theriso in Kydonia, today, 11/24 March 1905, proclaims its political union with the Kingdom of Greece, in a single free and constitutional state".

The following day, Papagiannakis, a former deputy in the Cretan Assembly, and Konstantinos Manos, communicated to the consuls of the Great Powers, on behalf of the rebels, the reasons that had led to the revolt. They mentioned the transitional character of the present government and the eventual desire to join Greece, and cited the political instability which prevented foreign investment and hindered the island's development. Finally, they mentioned the growing general discontent because of the government's "nearly absolutist" nature.

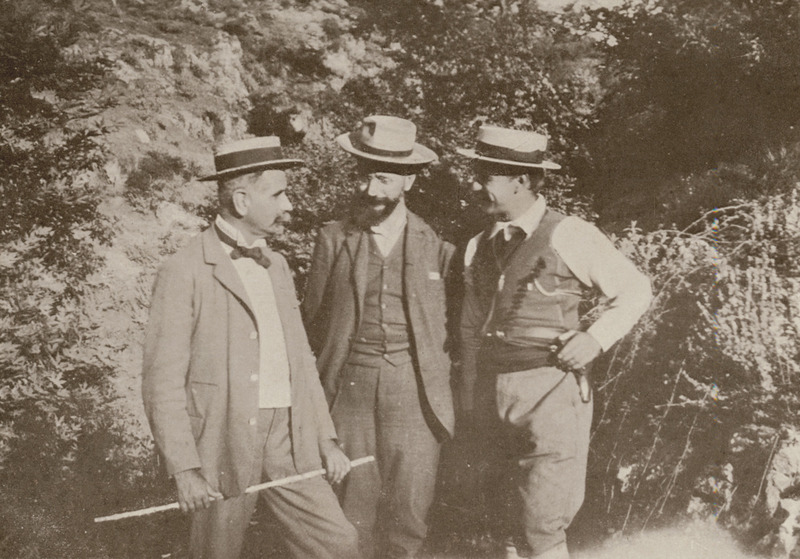
The triumvirate of the revolt: Foumis, Venizelos and Manos at Theriso in 1905

From Theriso, Venizelos organised a provisional government that printed its own postage stamps and newspaper. Papagianannakis was elected president of the insurrection's assembly and was assisted by four vice-presidents. A revolutionary triumvirate emerged: Konstantinos Foumis, a childhood friend of Venizelos' and former High Court prosecutor, as well as a member of parliament and former minister, was assigned charge of finances; Konstantinos Manos, the former mayor of Chania, handled the military aspect and held the post of general secretary; Venizelos covered the political and organisational side.

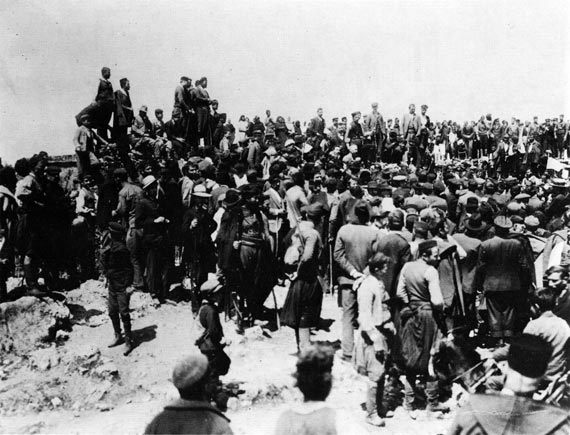
Meeting during a speech by Venizelos on 25 March 1905

The opposition decided not to take part in the elections scheduled for 24 March [O.S. 11 March] 1905 that would choose 64 Cretan deputies (in addition to the ten directly named by Prince George). The Theriso insurgents called for a boycott of the elections and for an armed struggle against the regime.

The new assembly, which met on 20 April at Chania, was opened by a speech from Prince George on the economy and planned reforms. However, as soon as he left the chamber, the assembly voted in favour of Enosis. In the assembly hall, entirely decorated with Greek flags, the deputies proclaimed the union of Crete with the Greek mother country and placed it under the control of King George I. They then informed the consuls of the Great Powers at Chania of this resolution.

On 31 May, at the end of the parliamentary session, most of the deputies joined the Theriso Assembly. A month later, two of the prince's chief counselors, Kriaris and Koundouros (the finance minister), resigned their posts and joined their former colleague in the mountains.

=== Quasi civil war ===
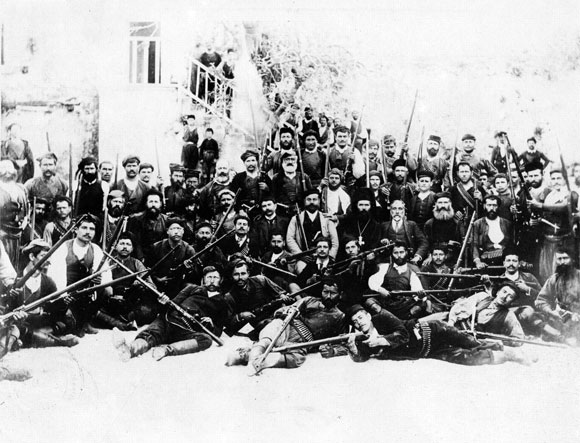
Revolutionaries at Theriso

Martial law was declared by Prince George, who only had 1,100 gendarmes at his disposal, as well as recognition from the European powers. The presence of two parallel governments led to a near-civil war among the population, with clashes leaving several victims in the vicinity of Chania. At the end of April, armed encounters between gendarmes and rebels took place at Voukolies. Three rebels and two gendarmes were killed, while fifteen peasants were wounded. During the skirmishes, residents set ablaze the gendarmes' stations.

At the beginning of August, the insurgents took the customs house at Kasteli Panormos. On the morning of 7 August, the Russian gunboat Khrabry, with 200 Imperial Guards aboard, as well as several Cretan gendarmes, laid anchor off Kastelli. Two Russian officers and an Italian lieutenant of the gendarmerie went to meet the rebels in order to engage in negotiations. The Italian gendarme ordered the insurgents to wave the white flag of surrender in the next half-hour or else face shelling. An hour and a half later, the Khrabry opened fire. This incident caused greater unrest.

While Konstantinos Manos marched on Rethymno seeking to free political prisoners, insurgents attacked Koubes (west of Rethymno). The following day, Colonel Urbanovich send fifty infantrymen there to defend the position, but the Russian soldiers suffered a setback. Urbanovich himself then went to the scene leading a column of 400 soldiers. In the face of these reinforcements, the rebels had to abandon their positions and beat a retreat south to Atsipopoulo, on the heights of Rethymno. After violent combat pitting them against the Russians and the gendarmes, the Cretans ended up ceding the village to the Russians. Among the victims of the fighting were certain insurgent leaders. The reports of the French consul at Chania observe that, despite these events, the insurgents were not leading a systematic attack against European troops.

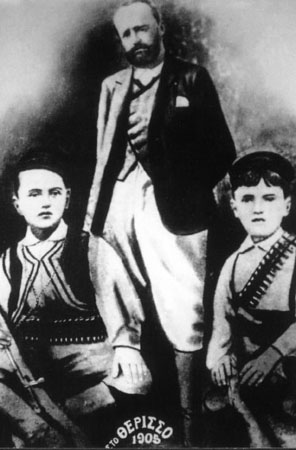
Venizelos and his sons Kyriakos and Sophoklis at Theriso in 1905

At the beginning of summer in 1905, Prince George realised the importance of renewing dialogue with Venizelos. He wished to do so through a mutual acquaintance, James Bourchier, then correspondent in the region for The Times. At first agreeing to talks at the Theriso camp, Venizelos then declined the invitation, claiming that any cooperation with the High Commissioner was impossible.

During a new parliamentary session in September, the Cretan Assembly, encouraged by the Theriso revolt, voted for several reforms taken directly from the Venizelist programme:

- Abolition of the prince's prerogative to name mayors and municipal councillors;
- Introduction of universal male suffrage for all municipal functions;
- Abolition of the prince's prerogative to name ten Assembly deputies of his choice;
- Abrogation of restrictions on freedom of the press;
- Modification of the electoral laws.

Before the Prince's allies had time to respond, the Assembly decided to convoke a National Assembly that could make laws regarding all the relevant issues.

The arrival of winter made life more difficult for the insurgents hiding in the mountains. Moreover, since October, the financial situation had been worrisome. In order to sustain the insurgents’ war effort, Venizelos had to take out loans. Thus, he borrowed 100,000 francs in obligations of 5 francs each in Greece. October also saw the first defections. Rebel bands from around Sitia laid down their arms and were granted an amnesty. In mid-October, Venizelos and his comrades recognised that it would be difficult to maintain the revolt, all the more so as the latest military operations had been directly aimed at them, notably by the Russians. They gave notice that they were ready to entrust the island's fate to the Great Powers. Venizelos participated in new negotiations with the consuls, seeking to obtain a maximum of concessions regarding the island's internal affairs. In a letter addressed to the Great Powers, he stated his intention to lay down arms in exchange for honourable conditions. Most of the insurgents were ready to hand over their weapons and, for those who refused to lay down arms, it was proposed that they be transported to Greece without being disarmed. In exchange for 800 guns and the same number of cartridges, an amnesty would be possible for the insurgents, except for the gendarmes who had deserted. With these conditions, Venizelos accepted surrender. Several days later, he obtained the right to have the deserting gendarmes transported to Greece. On 25 November, the Theriso camp was broken up and an amnesty proclaimed.

=== International reaction ===
From the beginning of the insurrection, the Great Powers' consuls based in Crete convened in numerous meetings. The reinforcement of the local gendarmerie with European troops was quickly planned. With similar speed, Prince George of Greece secured from the European powers the creation of an international corps intended to aid the Cretan gendarmerie in protecting Chania from a possible rebel attack.

The Greek government, led by Theodoros Deligiannis, opposed Venizelos' action. Deligiannis informed King George of the insurrection and Prince George of his support, and denounced "Venizelos' coup d'etat in Crete" publicly.

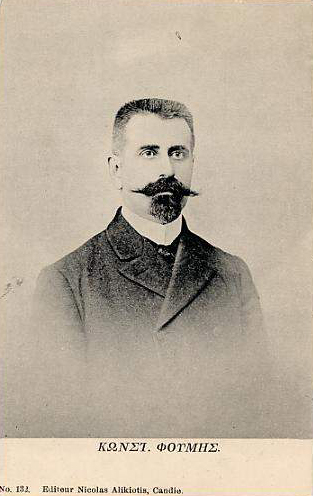
Konstantinos Foumis

Among the European nations, Russia reacted most promptly to the events. According to Venizelos' biographer Chester, the Russian conscripts were particularly cruel in their treatment of the Venizelists. During March and April, a contingent of the Tsar's soldiers marched toward the Lefka Ori accompanied by Cretan gendarmes. At the beginning of June, Russian troops disembarked in Crete and took several villages while the Russian fleet bombarded several others. The British, despite their support of the existing regime, only took a few symbolic actions without real impact. As for the French and the Italians, they avoided taking part in any anti-revolutionary activity. Nevertheless, an international force was assembled at Alikianos, on the road to Theriso, ready to receive orders. With the arrival of troops at Alikianos, Colonel Lubanski of the French Army organised a first meeting with the insurgents at Fournes, between Alikianos and Theriso, in a spot where the insurgents could see unmistakably the European force gathered in the valley. The talks took place on 1 April and were attended by Konstantinos Foumis and Konstantinos Manos, with Colonel Lubanski receiving the insurgents' grievances. The following day, the latter went to Theriso with a message for Venizelos: the Powers were unanimous regarding the impossibility of the island's annexation by Greece.

After the Cretan Assembly issued its declaration of independence in April 1905, the Great Powers responded on 2 May (OS): they were determined to use their naval and ground forces if necessary to maintain order. That same day, at Heraklion, the Greek flag flying above a government building was discreetly removed by the British Army and replaced with a Cretan flag.

Later however, as the Great Powers realised that Prince George had lost popular support, they arranged for negotiations. On 13 July, the insurgent leaders were invited to meet the European consuls. The following day, Venizelos, Foumis and Manos met them at a monastery near Mournies. Each leader went to the monastery accompanied by his men, who surrounded the building, but without incident. With each side remaining camped on its positions, no agreement was reached during the talks.

On 31 July, the Powers declared martial law. This measure seems to have had a minimal impact: the insurgents then controlled the entire west of the island, where order reigned, and they were ready to retreat into the White Mountains if necessary. Afterwards, the foreign troops increased their activity. The British occupied Heraklion, the Russians Rethymno, the Italians Kissamos and the French Agios Nikolaos, Sitia and Ierapetra. At Rethymno, the Russians declared a state of siege and the measures they took were more severe than in the island's other regions.

In November 1905, in response to Venizelos' letter affirming his willingness to lay down arms, the Powers agreed to significant reforms and proclaimed a general amnesty in exchange for 700–800 guns. An international commission visited the island and recommended the overhaul of the Cretan gendarmerie so that Greek officers would lead it, and the withdrawal of international forces present on the island starting in 1897.

== End of the conflict ==
At the end of November 1905, close to 1,000 insurgents and gendarmes were transported to Greece. Nevertheless, despite their departure and the halt to the revolt called by Venizelos, Crete remained tense and the island was liable to erupt in insurrection yet again. Tensions between the supporters of each side led to conflict. For instance, when municipal elections were held and the opposition won 40 of 77 available mayoral posts, bloodshed resulted.

In February 1906, the Great Powers sent a mission to evaluate Crete's administration and finances. At the end of March, the members of the commission finished their study, which they gave to the Powers. Fresh legislative elections took place in May 1906. The Prince's party won 78 seats in the assembly, while the opposition won 36. When Prince George opened the parliamentary session in July, he announced that the international commission's report had been studied by the Great Powers, who were also considering how Cretans' national aspirations could be taken into account. Strengthened in its intentions, the assembly once again voted for Crete's annexation by Greece and suspended its activities until the Powers' decision was to be made known.

On 25 July, at Chania, the Great Powers announced a series of proposed reforms for the island:

- Reform of the gendarmerie, by placing a Greek officer at its head
- Creation of Cretan armed forces that would allow the definitive withdrawal of international troops
- Agreement on a loan of 9,300,000 francs, two thirds of which would be devoted to public works, with the remaining third serving as an indemnity to the victims of the recent insurrections
- Extension to Crete of the Greek Finance Commission (an international commission controlling Greek finances)
- Creation of a commission composed of Cretans and consuls to review the expropriation of Muslim properties, lands, mosques and cemeteries
- Equal rights for Christians and Muslims
- Constitutional revision
- Agreement on the points of disagreement with Turkey, among which were the question of the national flag, the detention of Cretan prisoners in Turkey, telegraph rates and the protection of Cretans abroad and in Turkey
- A recommendation obliging the consuls to consult with local authorities on all matters of public order
- A report on interest payments on a 4,000,000-franc loan through 1911

Venizelos was disposed to accept the proposals, but Prince George viewed them with hostility. In the following days, he asked for Athens to present his resignation to the Powers. His father, King George I, exercised his full powers in order to try and modify the reforms granted to the island, but the sole concession he was able to obtain was the right to choose his son's successor.

In the assembly, 80 of 130 deputies, all close to the government, showed their displeasure with the idea of replacing George, a development that threatened to plunge the island anew into revolt. The closer the Prince's departure seemed, the more his allies agitated in the hope of a new European intervention. However, it was clear to the Powers this time that the situation could only improve with George's departure.

On 25 September [O.S. 12 September] 1906, Prince George left the island for good. Numerous sympathisers converged upon Chania to bid their goodbyes. Six hundred of these were armed, which added to the moment's tension. There was no longer any question of delaying his departure and proceeding to hold lavish ceremonies for him. He went on board the Greek battleship Psara and, while the crowd began to stir itself up, troops intervened at the same time as British soldiers disembarked.

== Aftermath ==
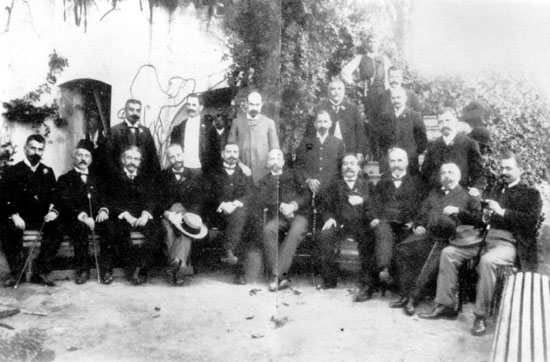
Committee for drafting the Cretan constitution, 1906

Prince George of Greece was replaced by Alexandros Zaimis, a former Greek prime minister, for a five-year term beginning on 18 September 1906. From June 1906, an agreement between the former rebels of Theriso and the Cretan Assembly allowed for the creation of a constituent assembly led by Antonios Michelidakis. On 2 December, this body submitted a new constitution to Zaimis, who then swore allegiance to it.

Order gradually returned to the island. A public administration was set up and laws passed for improving the health and education systems. In July 1907, Michelidakis was elected president of the Cretan Assembly, defeating Konstantinos Foumis by 34 to 31 votes. Impressed by the efforts the Cretan government had made, and having received assurances regarding the safety of the Muslim population, the European powers decided to send their troops home. On 26 August 1908, the first French contingents embarked at Chania, paving the way for a complete evacuation of the island.

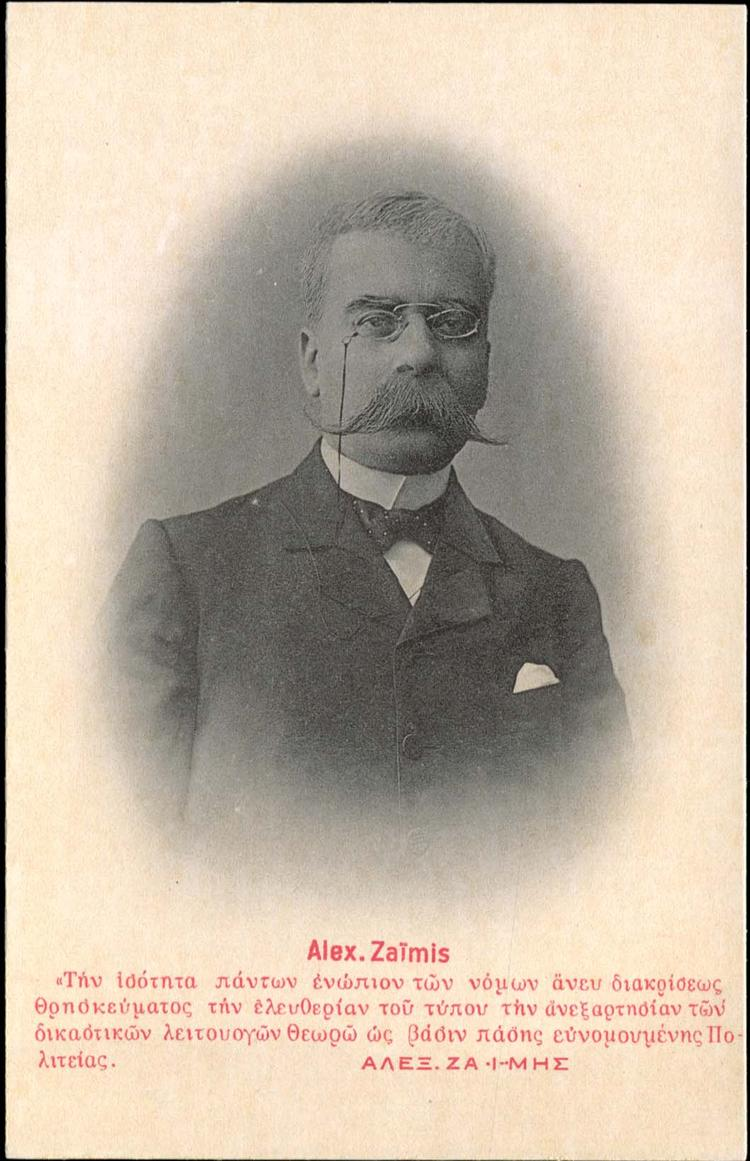
Alexandros Zaimis

In 1908, the Young Turk Revolution roiled the Ottoman political landscape and strained relations between Turkey and Crete. The empire's new leaders wished to abrogate the agreements adopted concerning the island's statute and reintegrate Crete into the Empire. On 10 October, taking advantage of Zaimis’ absence, the committee exercising his duties proclaimed Crete's union with Greece, an action later approved by parliament. The office of High Commissioner was abolished and the Greek constitution adopted. An executive committee met, with Venizelos at its centre holding the foreign affairs portfolio. The Greek government of Georgios Theotokis did not risk ratifying this union, but the Great Powers only protested half-heartedly, continuing their military withdrawal and completing it in June 1909. In 1913, following the First Balkan War, Crete achieved official union with Greece.

The Theriso revolt established Eleftherios Venizelos’ fame in Crete and also in continental Greece; he would go on to serve as Prime Minister of Crete from April to September 1910. The following month, King George I invited him to become Prime Minister of Greece, an office he would hold seven times between 1910 and 1933.
