= Halepa =

Neighborhood of Chania city, Greece

Halepa or Chalepa (Greek: Χαλέπα) was formerly a town in northern Crete. It is now one of the districts of Chania.

Its name was once well known owing to the Pact of Halepa, an agreement of 1878 on the administration of Crete as part of the Ottoman Empire. The local football team is Asteras Halepa.

Emmanouil Antoniadis and Konstantinos Mitsotakis were born in Halepa.
