= Pact of Halepa =

1878 treaty between the Ottoman Empire and Crete

The Pact of Halepa (Greek: Σύμβαση της Χαλέπας) or Halepa Charter (Χάρτης της Χαλέπας) was an agreement made in 1878 between the Ottoman Empire (then ruled by the Sultan Abdul Hamid II) and the representatives of the Cretan Revolutionary Committee, which secured wide-ranging autonomy for the island of Crete. It was named after the place where it was signed, Halepa (now a district of Chania).

== History ==
Following the Russo-Turkish War of 1877–78 and the Treaty of Berlin (1878), the Ottoman government pledged to carry out reforms in the Empire's administration to remove discrimination against the Christian population. The island of Crete, an Ottoman province since 1669, was a particular case. Since the Greek War of Independence broke out in 1821, the Christian Cretans had repeatedly risen in revolt against the Ottoman Empire, seeking union with Greece, most notably in the Cretan Revolution of 1866–69. More recently, since 1875, the island had been again in a state of revolt, and a revolutionary committee of leading Christian Cretans had been formed.

As a first gesture of conciliation, the Sultan had for the first time appointed a Christian Greek, Kostakis Adosidis Pasha, as Governor-General (vali) of the island, and following the Treaty of Berlin, Muhtar Pasha was sent to the island for negotiations with the Revolutionary Committee. Thomas Backhouse Sandwith, the British Consul in Crete, proposed to the British Ambassador in Constantinople that he should seek to mediate between the Ottoman authorities and the armed Cretan Christian rebels. This he did, working closely with the British Ambassador who was able to exercise considerable influence over the Ottoman government. They communicated frequently, often several times a day by telegram. The Pact of Halepa was the outcome.

On 15 October (27 October Gregorian) 1878, this final agreement was reached and signed at the home of the journalist Costis Mitsotakis (the namesake grandfather of the future Greek Prime Minister) at Halepa. Its stipulations were:

- The island of Crete would be governed by a Governor-General with a five-year tenure; if the Governor-General was a Christian, he would have a Muslim Deputy, and vice versa
- Public services would be staffed by native Cretans, while Greek became the language of the law courts
- A portion of the island's tax proceeds would remain in Crete for local use, and a series of tax reductions were granted to Crete
- The number of Christian sub-provincial governors would be greater than the Muslim ones
- A new Cretan Gendarmerie would police the island, recruited by native inhabitants
- The public use of the Greek language, the foundation of Greek-language associations, newspapers, etc. was sanctioned
- A general amnesty for those who had taken part in the uprising was proclaimed, and the licensed carrying of arms by the populace was granted

The agreement was considered as superseding any future or past Ottoman legislation, or even contradictory provisions of the Ottoman Constitution. As a result, Crete became an autonomous state within the Ottoman Empire. The treaty was by and large enforced until 1889, when it was abrogated by Shakir Pasha. This led to the outbreak of another Cretan uprising in 1897–98, and the Greco-Turkish War of 1897, after which the Ottoman army withdrew from the island and Crete was recognized as an autonomous state under international guarantee, leading eventually to its union with Greece in the Balkan Wars of 1912–13.

== See also ==
- History of Crete
- Cretan revolt (1878)
- Cretan Revolt (1897–1898)
- Greco-Turkish War (1897)
