= Prince George of Greece and Denmark =

Greek prince (1869–1957)

Prince George
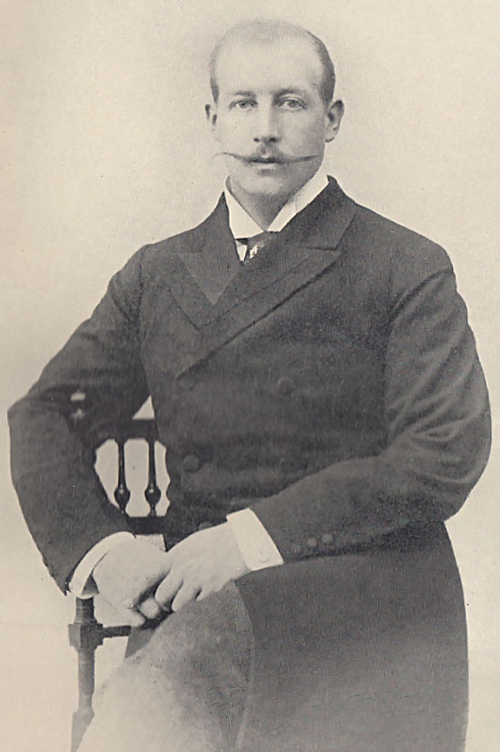
- George c. 1902

High Commissioner of Cretan State
- In office: 1898–1906
- Predecessor: Position established
- Successor: Alexandros Zaimis
- Born: 24 June 1869; Mon Repos, Corfu, Greece
- Died: 25 November 1957 (aged 88); Saint-Cloud, Île-de-France, France
- Burial: Royal Cemetery, Tatoi Palace, Athens, Greece
- Spouse: Marie Bonaparte (m. 1907)
- Issue: Prince Peter; Princess Eugénie
- House: Glücksburg
- Father: George I of Greece
- Mother: Olga Constantinovna of Russia
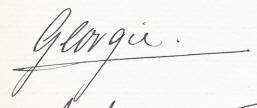
- Signature
- Military career
- Allegiance: Kingdom of Denmark; Kingdom of Greece
- Branch: Royal Danish Navy; Royal Hellenic Navy
- Conflicts: Greco-Turkish War (1897); Cretan Revolt; Theriso Revolt

Prince George of Greece and Denmark (Greek: Γεώργιος, romanized: Geórgios; 24 June 1869 – 25 November 1957) was the second son and child of George I of Greece and Olga Konstantinovna of Russia. He served as high commissioner of the Cretan State during its transition towards independence from Ottoman rule and union (Enosis) with Greece.

== Childhood ==
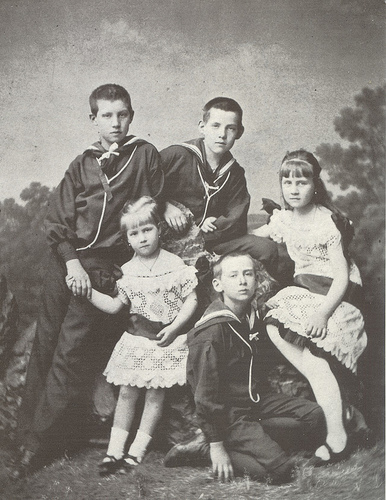
Prince George (centre back) with his siblings, in 1880

Born at Mon Repos palace in Corfu, Prince George spent his childhood in Greece with his parents and his six siblings, splitting their time between the Royal Palace on Syntagma Square and the Tatoi Palace, north of Athens, at the foot of Mount Parnitha. As stipulated in the Constitution, the children were brought up in the Greek Orthodox Church, though their father remained Lutheran.

The royal family had a keen interest in archeology and regularly accompanied the King to the excavation sites that had been established at the Acropolis in the 1880s. After the family meal on Sundays, it was not unheard of for the family to go to the ancient port of Phalerum to walk by the sea. The King and his family would then take a horse-drawn omnibus (which had a compartment reserved for them). When the bus's route passed the palace, the omnibus would stop for them, the palace trumpets played a salute, and the family would get out hastily, taking care to show that they didn't make the other passengers wait too long. This attitude endeared them to the people and went a long way to maintaining their popularity – which hadn't always been constant. George I often reminded his children: "Never forget that you are strangers among the Greeks, and make sure they never remember it".

A typical day for young Prince George and his siblings began at 6am, with a cold bath. After a first breakfast, they had lessons from 7 to 9.30am, and then had a second breakfast, with their father and any other available family members. Their studies then continued from 10am to midday, when the children would go to the palace gardens to do exercise and gymnastics. After a family lunch, there were more lessons. By 7pm, the royal children were in bed. George followed this routine until the age of fourteen, after which he was allowed to dine with his elders, but still had to be in bed at precisely 10pm.

George and his brothers were taught by three foreign tutors: Dr Otto Lüders (a Prussian), Mr Dixon (an Englishman) and Mr Brissot (a Frenchman). The children's mother tongue was English, which they spoke with their parents, but their father, George I, insisted that they use Greek during their lessons. The princes would go on to speak Greek for the rest of their lives. They also learned French, German and Danish. George was not a particularly bright student. His tutors thought him to be slow and stupid, and did not try to hide their disapproval at his lack of effort.

=== Naval training with Prince Valdemar ===
In 1883, George's father sent him to live at Bernstorff Palace near Copenhagen in Denmark. George was to enlist in the Danish royal navy, aged just fourteen. Freed from the constraints of the palace and his tutors, he became one of the best students in his class at the Danish Naval Academy.

While in Denmark, the teenage George was in the care of his grandfather, King Christian IX, and his youngest uncle, Prince Valdemar. Twenty-five year old Valdemar was admiral of the Danish fleet and was naturally chosen by the Greek King as a mentor for his son. However, George and Valdemar's relationship quickly developed beyond familial relations. While watching his parents' boat leave Denmark, George was overwhelmed by a strong sense of abandonment. Realising this, Valdemar took George's hand. For the teenage George, this sign of affection was a revelation. He fell very deeply in love with his uncle and later described that moment to his fiancée: "From that day forward, from that moment, I loved him, and I have never had any other friend than him".

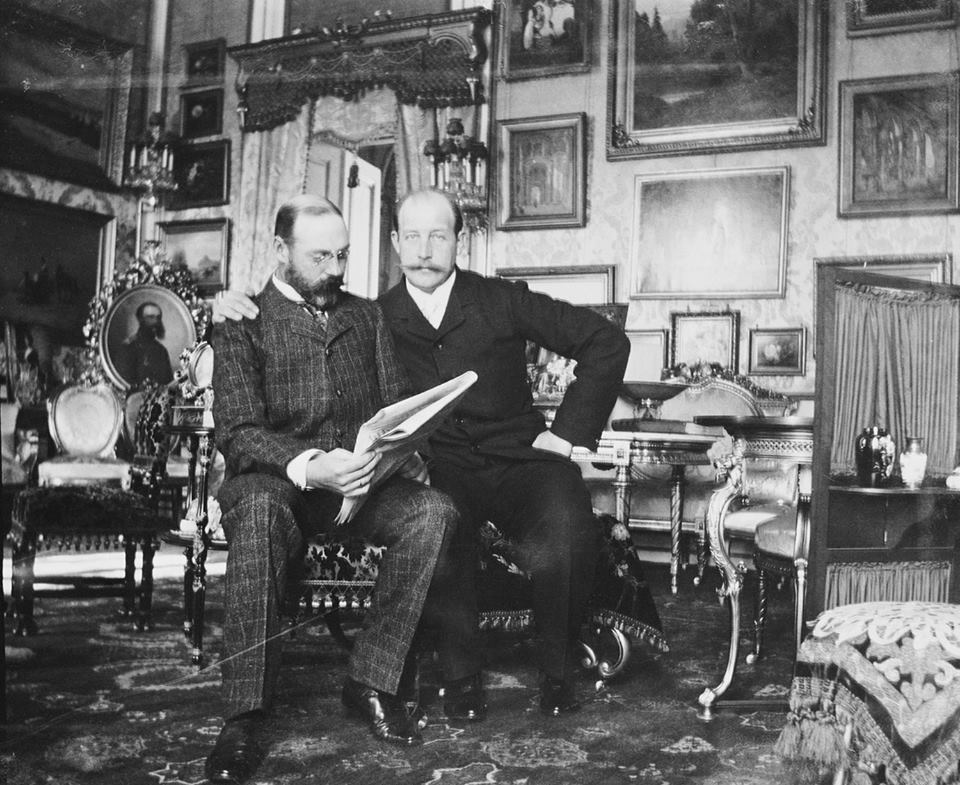
Prince Valdemar and Prince George, c. 1900

This passion between the two men would last until Prince Valdemar's death on 14 January 1939. Even after they were both married, George and Valdemar would meet every year for several weeks, in Denmark or abroad. Hidden behind the guise of a strong friendship, their homosexuality never seems to have attracted the family's disapproval, and many photographs of them taken together during their annual reunions or family occasions show that they were never reluctant to be seen together.

As his duty as a prince was principally to have a family and continue the royal family line, George's family sought to find him a wife. In 1888, while his older brother Prince Constantine's marriage was being arranged with Sophie of Prussia, negotiations were begun for a marriage the following year for George and Princess Marguerite of Orléans. This marriage would have made George Valdemar's brother-in-law, as Marguerite's sister Marie was Valdemar's wife. However the negotiations fell through and George remained single for several years.

== The Ōtsu Incident ==
After his time with the Danish fleet, Prince George left to pursue his naval training in Russia, where he was made Lieutenant of the imperial navy. Shortly after, in 1891, his uncle Tsar Alexander III, requested he accompany his cousin Tsesarevich Nicholas on a voyage to Asia. The two cousins, who had known each other since childhood, boarded the cruiser Pamiat Azova for a voyage around the world that would take them to India, Malaysia, Java, Thailand, Indochina, China and Japan.

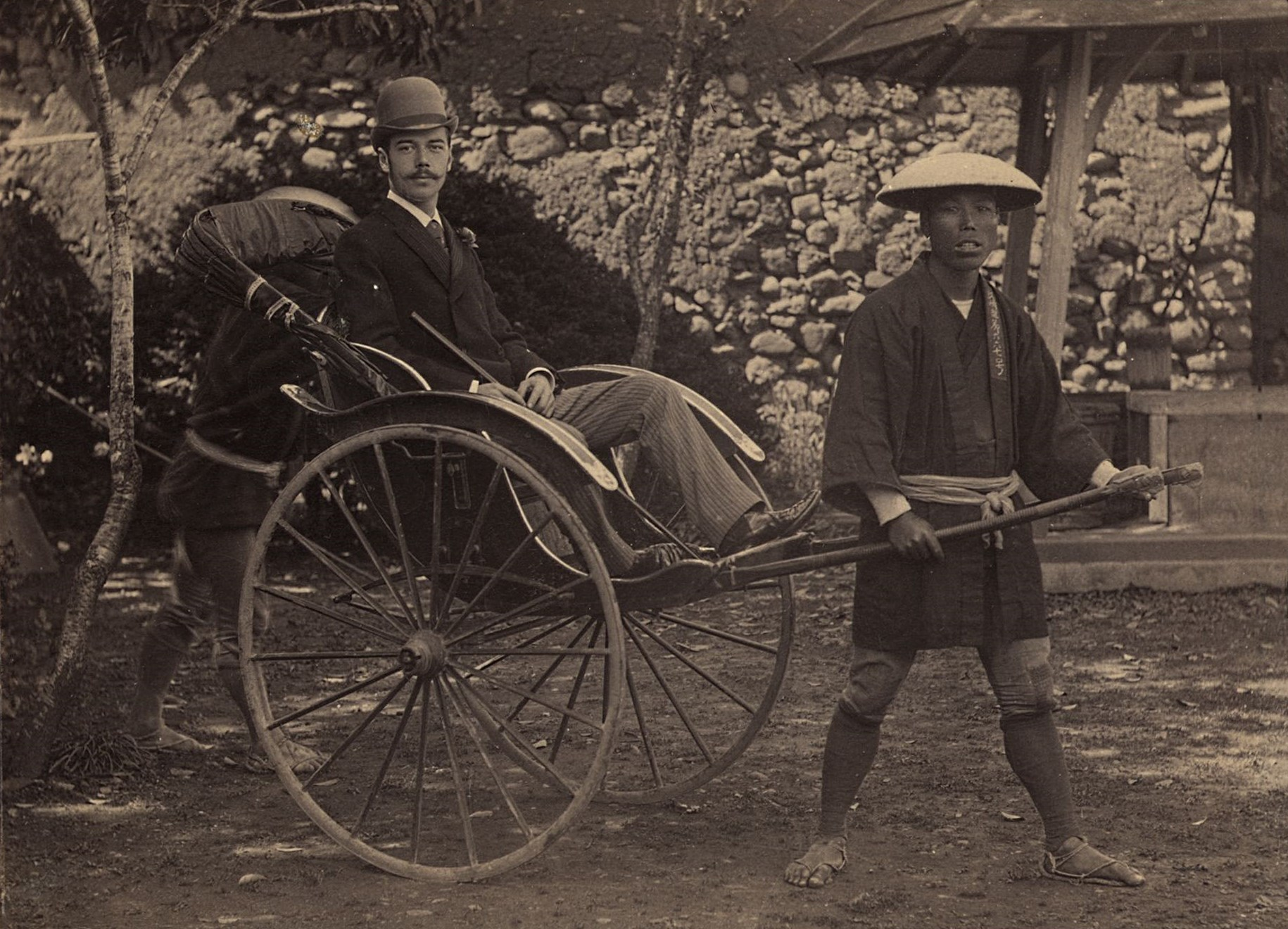
The future Nicholas II in Nagasaki

To begin with, the expedition went smoothly as the Princes alternated between official visits, hunting tigers, elephants and crocodiles, and buying antiques. However, their stay in Japan would make a lasting mark on George's life. On 11 May 1891, Tsuda Sanzō, a Japanese policeman escorting the Russian crown prince attempted to assassinate Nicholas, striking him twice with a sabre. George was able to knock Sanzō unconscious with his cane, saving the life of the future Tsar. The event became known as the Ōtsu Incident.

The Greek Prince's actions prompted immediate thanks from the representatives of Japanese emperor Meiji Tenno, who was anxious to preserve good relations between Japan and Russia. The emperor and his wife gifted George an elephant made of Satsuma porcelaine. However, the news of the attack that reached Europe did not portray George as his cousin's saviour. The version of the incident that arrived at Saint Petersburg reported Prince George as the assassin. According to this account, the young Prince had taken his cousin into dangerous areas and then encouraged him to desecrate a temple which provoked the people's anger. George was forced to leave his cousin, in disgrace, causing lasting damage to his reputation. He left Yokohama aboard a Russian gunboat and left for the United States, followed by the United Kingdom. Upon his return to Europe, the Tsesarevich Nicholas revealed he was grateful to his cousin, and silenced his detractors.

== First modern Olympic games ==
George, along with his brothers Constantine and Nicholas, were involved with the organization of the 1896 Summer Olympics in Athens – the first modern Olympic games. George served as president of the Sub-Committee for Nautical Sports on the newly created Hellenic Olympic Committee. He served as President of the judges, and also as a judge for the weightlifting competition, and demonstrated his strength by lifting the weights one-handed at the end of the event. As a member of the royal family, he gave more credence to the judges' decisions.

During the marathon event, won by the shepherd Spiridon Louis, George and Constantine left the spectator's stand to run the last metres with the runner.

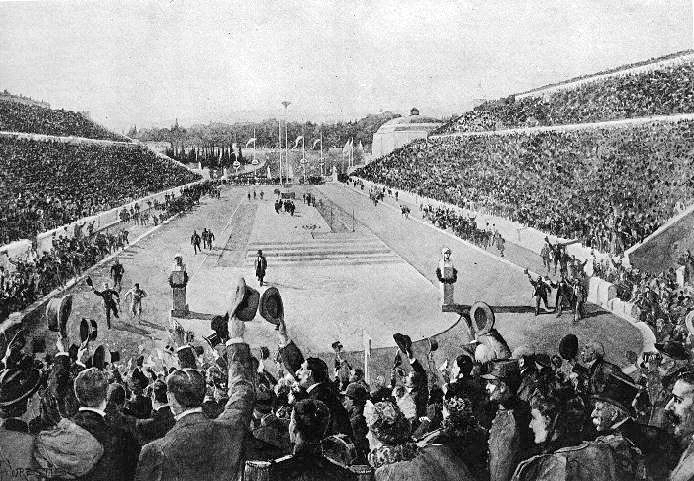
Spiridon Louis wins the marathon with the three Greek princes by his side

As President of the Olympic judges, George was involved in examining the case of Hungarian sprinter Gyula Kellner, who disputed his fourth place ranking, against the Greek Spyridon Belokas in third place. Belokas was accused of completing part of the event in a carriage. The Prince decided to disqualify Belokas.

The Games were a great success for Greece, revitalising Greek national pride.

== High Commissioner of autonomous Crete ==
Although much of the Greek mainland and islands became independent during the 1820s, the island of Crete remained in Ottoman control. Yet Crete was still considered Greek by many, and Crete demanded reunification with the mainland for the rest of the 19th century. There were many revolts and uprisings on the island (in 1841, 1858, 1866-1869, 1878, 1888-1889 and 1897-1898). In February 1897, a Greek navy fleet, led by Prince George was sent to Souda Bay by the Prime Minister Theodoros Deligiannis's government. When 2,000 Greek volunteers landed in Crete, George was commanding a flotilla of six torpedo boats that patrolled in northern Cretan waters to prevent any intervention from the Ottoman navy. International intervention followed, with attacks from the Great Powers, who occupied the island and divided it into British, French, Russian and Italian areas of control.

By the end of March, the Great Powers were considering George to be the island's governor. It is thought that France proposed the post of High Commissioner, whereas Russia suggested the title of the 'Prince of Candia', rather than merely being a governor.

In April, Greece declared war on the Ottoman empire, known as the Thirty days' war. However the Greeks were very badly prepared and were easily crushed by the Ottomans. The Great Powers, who had initially been opposed by the Greeks, secured in negotiating less harsh terms for the Greek kingdom, notably that Crete would be autonomous while remaining nominally in Ottoman control. For this, the chancelleries needed a governor who had the support of the Cretan people.

In 1898, Turkish troops were ejected and a new Greek-dominated government was set up, still nominally under Ottoman suzerainty. Prince George, not yet thirty, was made High Commissioner, and a joint Muslim-Christian assembly was part-elected, part-appointed. However, this was not enough to satisfy Cretan desire for union with Greece.

Eleftherios Venizelos was the leader of the movement to unite Crete with Greece. He had fought in the earlier revolts and was now a member of the Assembly, acting as minister of justice to Prince George. They soon found themselves opposed. George, a staunch royalist, had assumed absolute power. Venizelos led the opposition to this. In 1905, however, he summoned an illegal revolutionary assembly in Theriso, in the hills near Chania, the then capital of the island, the "Theriso revolt".

During the revolt, the newly created Cretan Gendarmerie remained faithful to George. In this difficult period, the Cretan population were divided: in the 1906 elections the pro-Prince parties took 38,127 votes, while pro-Venizelos parties took 33,279. But the Gendarmerie managed to execute its duties without taking sides. Finally, in September 1906, George was forced to resign and was replaced by former Greek prime minister and future president Alexandros Zaimis. George left the island and, in 1908, the Cretan Assembly unilaterally declared enosis (union) with Greece.

In October 1912 George returned from Paris to Athens so that he could join the naval ministry as Greece prepared for war against the Ottoman Empire. Later he served as aide-de-camp to King George who, however, was assassinated in March 1913. Following the assassination, George temporarily moved to Copenhagen to settle his father's financial affairs there, as he had never ceased to be a Prince of Denmark.

== Marriage and family ==
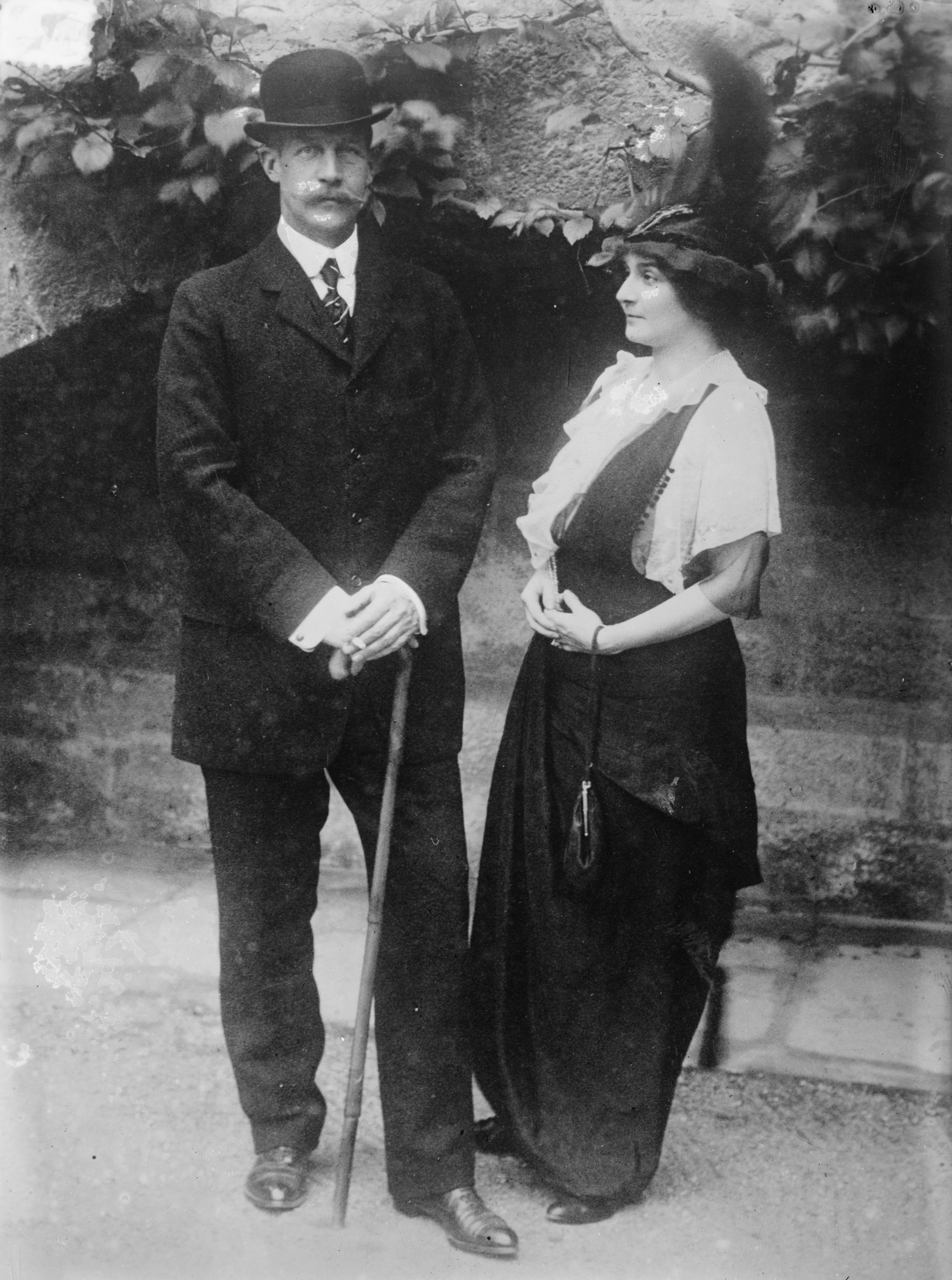
Prince George and his wife Marie Bonaparte, c. 1910–1915

Following a Parisian luncheon between King George and Prince Roland Bonaparte in September 1906 during which the king agreed to the prospect of a marriage between their children, George met Roland's daughter, Princess Marie Bonaparte (2 July 1882 – 21 September 1962) on 19 July 1907 at the Bonapartes' home in Paris. A member of one of the non-imperial branches of the Bonaparte dynasty, she was an heiress to the Blanc casino fortune through her mother.

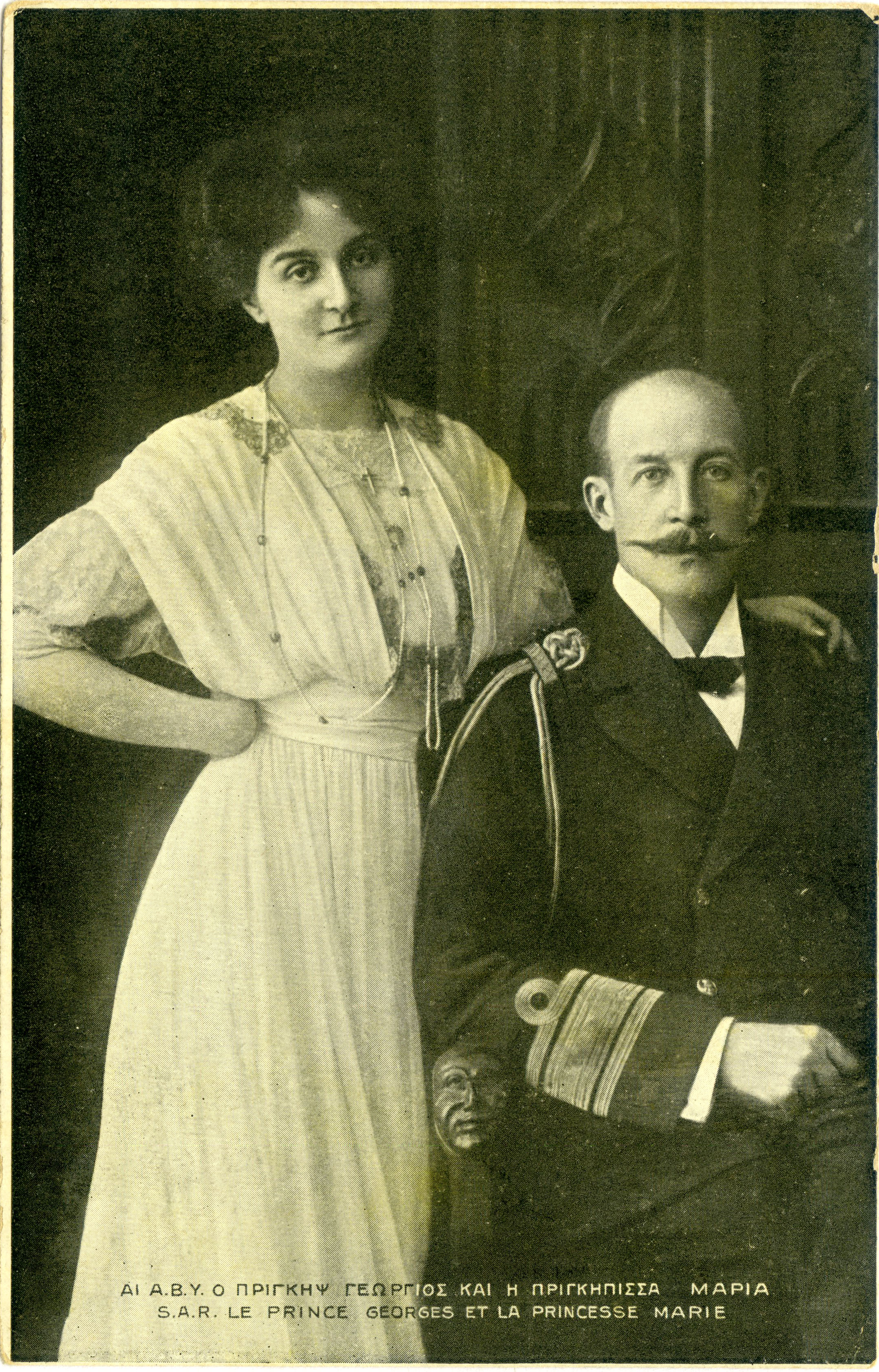
Prince George and his wife Marie Bonaparte

Although a homosexual, who lived most of the year with his uncle Prince Valdemar of Denmark with whom he had a life-long relationship, he dutifully courted her for twenty-eight days. He confided to her that he had experienced major disappointments when his roles in the Ōtsu incident and the Cretan governorship were misconstrued and under-appreciated by both individuals and governments who he felt should have known better. He also admitted that, contrary to what he knew were her hopes, he could not commit to living in France permanently since he had to remain prepared to undertake royal duties in Greece or Crete if summoned to do so. Once his proposal of marriage was tentatively accepted, the bride's father was astonished when George waived any contractual clause guaranteeing an allowance or inheritance from Marie; she would retain and manage her own fortune (a trust yielding 800,000 francs per annum) and only their future children would receive legacies.

George wed Marie in a civil ceremony in Paris on 21 November 1907 at the town hall in the 16th arrondissement. George's groomsmen were his brother Nicholas and the Greek minister Nikolaos Deligiannis. Marie's bridesmaids were her two aunts: Princess Jeanne Bonaparte and Louise Radziwill. They also held a second Greek Orthodox ceremony in Athens the following December, during which George's uncle Valdemar served as the koumbaros. To avoid facing his Greek political enemies, George would have preferred to have the religious ceremony in France, but his family would not hear of it.

By March Marie was pregnant and, as agreed, the couple returned to France to take up residence. When George brought his bride to Bernstorff for the first family visit, Valdemar's wife Marie d'Orléans was at pains to explain to Marie Bonaparte the intimacy which united uncle and nephew, so deep that at the end of each of George's several yearly visits to Bernstorff, he would weep, Valdemar would take sick, and the women learned the patience not to intrude upon their husbands' private moments. During the first of these visits, Marie Bonaparte and Valdemar found themselves engaging in the kind of passionate intimacies she had looked forward to with her husband who, however, only seemed to enjoy them vicariously, sitting or lying beside his wife and uncle. On a later visit, Marie Bonaparte carried on a passionate flirtation with Prince Aage, Valdemar's eldest son. In neither case does it appear that George objected, or felt obliged to give the matter any attention. However, George criticized Marie d'Orléans to his wife, alleging that she drank too much and was having an affair with his uncle's stablemaster. But Marie Bonaparte found no fault with her husband's aunt, rather, she admired the forbearance and independence of Valdemar's wife under circumstances which caused her bewilderment and estrangement from her own husband.

From 1913 to early 1916, George's wife carried on an intense flirtation, then an affair until May 1919 with French prime minister Aristide Briand. In 1915 Briand wrote to Marie that, having come to know and like Prince George, he felt guilty about their secret passion. George tried to persuade him that Greece, officially neutral during World War I but suspected of sympathy for the Central Powers, really hoped for an Allied victory: He may have influenced Briand to support the disastrous Allied expedition against the Turks at Salonika. When the prince and princess returned in July 1915 to France following a visit to the ailing King Constantine I in Greece, her affair with Briand had become notorious and George expressed a restrained jealousy. By December 1916 the French fleet was bombing Athens and in Paris Briand was suspected, alternately, of having seduced Marie in a futile attempt to bring Greece over to the Allied side, or of having been seduced by her to oust Constantine and set George upon the Greek throne.

Although he was on friendly terms with his wife's mentor, Sigmund Freud, in 1925 George asked Marie to give up her work as a psychoanalyst to devote herself to their family life, but she declined. When he learned from the newspapers in 1938 that his only son had married a Russian commoner, George forbade him to return home and refused ever to meet his wife.

Prince George and Princess Marie had two children, Petros and Evgenia.

- Prince Peter of Greece and Denmark (1908–1980)
- Princess Eugénie of Greece and Denmark (1910–1988); married, firstly, Prince Dominic Radziwill (1939), whom she divorced in 1946. Her second husband was HSH Prince Raimondo della Torre e Tasso, Duke of Castel Duino, whom she married in 1949 and divorced in 1965. She had children from both marriages.

In 1948, Prince George was named as one of the sponsors/godparents of his grandnephew Prince Charles of the United Kingdom (later King Charles III) along with King George VI, King Haakon VII of Norway, Queen Mary, Princess Margaret, the Dowager Marchioness of Milford Haven, Patricia, Lady Brabourne, and David Bowes-Lyon.

== Death ==
On 21 November 1957 Princess Marie and her husband celebrated their golden wedding anniversary. Prince George died 25 November 1957, aged eighty-eight, the longest-living dynast of the House of Oldenburg of his generation. He was buried at Tatoi Royal Cemetery with Danish and Greek flags, his wedding ring, a lock of Valdemar's hair, a photo of Valdemar, and earth from Bernstorff. Prince George was the last living child of King George and Queen Olga.

Georgioupolis, a coastal resort between Chania and Rethimno, was named after Prince George.

== Honours ==
Styles of Prince George
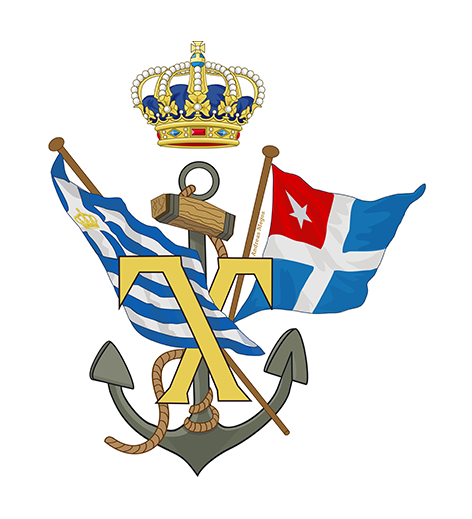
- Reference style: His Royal Highness
- Spoken style: Your Royal Highness

- Denmark:
  - Knight of the Order of the Elephant, 25 November 1888
  - Cross of Honour of the Order of the Dannebrog, 3 August 1889
  - Grand Commander of the Order of the Dannebrog, 10 July 1920
  - Commemorative Medal for the Golden Wedding of King Christian IX and Queen Louise
  - King Christian IX Centenary Medal
  - Navy Long Service Medal
  - King Christian X's Liberty Medal
- Empire of Japan: Grand Cordon of the Order of the Chrysanthemum, 14 May 1891
- Austria-Hungary: Grand Cross of the Royal Hungarian Order of Saint Stephen, 1896
- Grand Duchy of Hesse: Grand Cross of the Grand Ducal Hessian Order of Ludwig, 18 April 1904
- Kingdom of Italy: Knight of the Supreme Order of the Most Holy Annunciation, 2 May 1893
- Norway: Grand Cross of the Royal Norwegian Order of Saint Olav, with Collar, 19 March 1929
- Kingdom of Prussia: Knight of the Order of the Black Eagle
- Russian Empire: Knight of the Imperial Order of Saint Andrew the Apostle the First-called
- Sweden: Knight of the Royal Order of the Seraphim, 20 May 1919
- United Kingdom: Honorary Knight Grand Cross of the Most Honourable Order of the Bath (civil division), 29 June 1900
- United Kingdom: Honorary Knight Grand Cross of the Royal Victorian Order
- United Kingdom: Recipient of Queen Elizabeth II Coronation Medal

== Ancestry ==
Ancestors of Prince George of Greece and Denmark

8. Friedrich Wilhelm, Duke of Schleswig-Holstein-Sonderburg-Glücksburg
4. Christian IX of Denmark
9. Princess Louise Caroline of Hesse-Kassel
2. George I of Greece
10. Prince William of Hesse-Kassel
5. Louise of Hesse-Kassel
11. Princess Louise Charlotte of Denmark
1. Prince George of Greece and Denmark
12. Nicholas I of Russia
6. Grand Duke Constantine Nikolaevich of Russia
13. Charlotte of Prussia
3. Olga Constantinovna of Russia
14. Joseph, Duke of Saxe-Altenburg
7. Princess Alexandra of Saxe-Altenburg
15. Duchess Amelia of Württemberg

== See also ==
- International Squadron (Cretan intervention, 1897–1898)
