= Cretan Anthem =

1898–1908 national anthem of the Cretan State

Kritikos Ymnos
English: Cretan Anthem
- Κρητικός Ύμνος
- National anthem of Cretan State
- Lyrics: Ioannis Polemis
- Music: Dionysios Davrangas
- Adopted: 1898
- Relinquished: 1908

Audio sample
- file; help

The Cretan Anthem (Greek: Κρητικός Ύμνος, Kritikos Ymnos) was the national anthem of the Cretan State. It was adopted in 1898 and it was sung to the tune of the Greek national anthem, originally composed by Nikolaos Mantzaros and adopted by Dionysios Davrangas, with new words by the poet Ioannis Polemis, celebrating Crete's bloody struggles for freedom from the Ottoman Empire.

The anthem never gained much popularity, since the Cretans viewed the Cretan State as a temporary measure; the Greek national anthem was the de facto unofficial anthem, and after Crete unilaterally declared its union with the Kingdom of Greece in 1908 (not formally recognized until 1913, after the Balkan Wars), the Greek national anthem was used officially as well.

== Lyrics ==
Original Greek

Μεσ' το αίμα βουτημένη,
με πληγαίς νωπαίς ακόμα,
απ΄ της Κρήτης τ' άγιο χώμα,
επεταχθ' η Λευθεριά•
κι' αγκαλιάζοντας τη Δόξα
τη δαφνοστεφανωμένη
παίρνει δρόμους κι ανασταίνει
πολιτείαις και χωριά.
Χαιρετούν τον ερχομό της
βροντερόφωνα ντουφέκια,
κι' αστραπαίς κι' αστροπελέκια
χύνουν λάμψι περισσή•
και φωνή παλληκαρίσια
απ' την Ίδη κατεβαίνει
Χαίρε, Κρήτη ανδρειωμένη,
Χαιρ' ελεύθερο νησί.

Transliteration

Mes' to aíma voutiméni,
me pligaís nopaís akóma,
ap΄ tis Krítis t' ágio chóma,
epetachth' i Leftheriá•
ki' ankaliázontas ti dóxa
ti dafnostefanoméni
paírnei drómous ki anastaínei
politeíais kai choriá.
Chairetoún ton erchomó tis
vronterófona ntoufékia,
ki' astrapaís ki' astropelékia
chýnoun lámpsi perissí•
kai foní pallikarísia
ap' tin Ídi katevaínei
Chaíre, Kríti andreioméni,
Chair' eléfthero nisí.

English translation

Drenched in blood
with wounds still fresh
from Crete's holy soil
Liberty sprang forth
and embracing Glory
crowned with laurels
she seizes the streets
and raises up cities and villages.
Welcoming her arrival
rifles thunder,
and bolts and flashes of lightning
pour forth their shining abundance
and a young voice
calls down from Ida
Hail, mighty Crete
Hail, free island.
