= Hymn to Liberty =

National anthem of Greece and Cyprus

Hýmnos eis tin Eleutherían Hýmnos pros tin Eleutherían
English: Hymn to Liberty
- Ὕμνος εἰς τὴν Ἐλευθερίαν; Ὕμνος πρὸς τὴν Ἐλευθερίαν
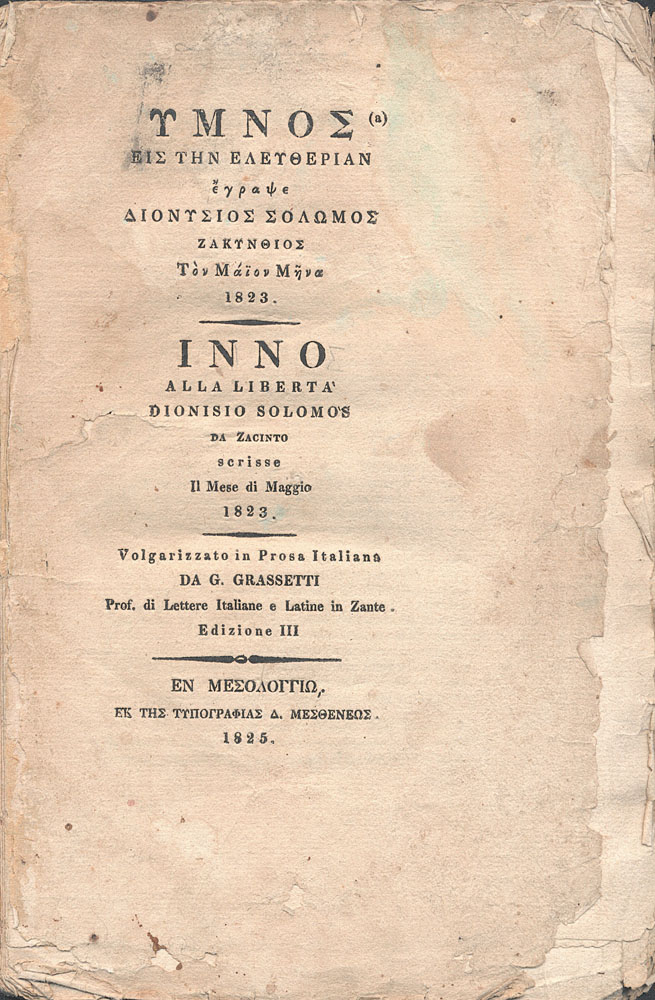
- 1825 book cover
- National anthem of Cyprus and Greece
- Lyrics: Dionysios Solomos, 1823
- Music: Nikolaos Chalikiopoulos Mantzaros, 1865
- Adopted: 1864 (by Greece); 1966 (by Cyprus)

Audio sample
- U.S. Navy Band instrumental version in F major: file; help

The "Hymn to Liberty", (Note: Greek: Ὕμνος εἰς τὴν Ἐλευθερίαν, Hýmnos eis tin Eleftherían, pronounced [ˈimnos is‿tin elefθeˈɾi.an] or Ὕμνος πρὸς τὴν Ἐλευθερίαν, Hýmnos pros tin Eleftherían, pronounced [ˈimnos pros‿tin elefθeˈɾi.an]) also known as the "Hymn to Freedom", is a Greek poem written by Dionysios Solomos in 1823 and set to music by Nikolaos Mantzaros in 1828. Consisting of 158 stanzas in total, its two first stanzas officially became the national anthem of Greece in 1864 and Cyprus in 1966.

== History ==
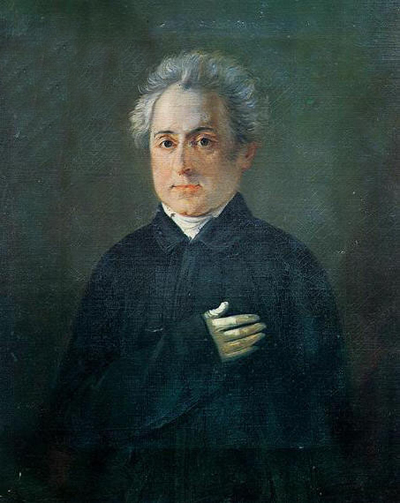
Dionysios Solomos, author of the lyrics

Dionysios Solomos wrote "Hymn to Liberty" in 1823 in Zakynthos, and one year later it was printed in Messolonghi. In October 1824 it was published in London by the Philhellenic Committee, and an Italian translation was published in the Messolonghi newspaper Ellinika Chronika at about the same time.

It was set to music in 1828 by the Corfiot operatic composer Nikolaos Mantzaros, who composed a choral versions, in 24 parts, and dedicated it to the first King of Greece, Otto. Otto awarded Mantzaros with the Silver Cross of the Order of the Redeemer as a token of appreciation, but during Otto's reign (1832–1862), an anthem based on God Save the King was used, with a text glorifying Otto.

After Otto's ouster in 1862, the "Hymn to Liberty" was adopted as the national and royal anthem of Greece in 1864. The "Hymn to Liberty" was also adopted as the national anthem of Cyprus by order of the Council of Ministers in 1966.

== Lyrics ==
Inspired by the Greek War of Independence, Solomos wrote the hymn to honour the struggle of Greeks for independence after centuries of Ottoman rule.

"Hymn to Liberty" recounts the misery of the Greeks under the Ottomans and their hope for freedom. He describes different events of the War, such as the execution of Patriarch Gregory V of Constantinople, the reaction of the Great Powers, extensively the Siege of Tripolitsa and the Christian character of the struggle.

The following are the first eight verses of the "Hymn to Liberty," from the first edition of 1825.

Greek original

Σὲ γνωρίζω ἀπὸ τὴν κόψι
Τοῦ σπαθιοῦ τὴν τρομερή,
Σὲ γνωρίζω ἀπὸ τὴν ὄψι,
Ποὺ μὲ βία μετράει τὴν γῆ.

Ἀπ' τὰ κόκκαλα βγαλμένη
Τῶν Ἑλλήνων τὰ ἱερά,
𝄆 Καὶ σὰν πρῶτα ἀνδρειωμένη,
Χαῖρε, ὢ χαῖρε, Ἐλευθεριά! 𝄇

Ἐκεῖ μέσα ἐκαρτεροῦσες,
Πικραμένη, ἐντροπαλή,
Κ' ἕνα στόμα ἀκαρτεροῦσες,
Ἔλα πάλι, νὰ σοῦ ‘πῇ.

Ἄργιε νἄλθῃ ἐκείνη ἡ 'μέρα,
Καὶ ἦταν ὅλα σιωπηλά,
𝄆 Γιατὶ τἄσκιαζε ἡ φοβέρα,
Καὶ τὰ πλάκονε ἡ σκλαβιά. 𝄇

Δυστυχής! παρηγορία
Μόνη σοῦ ἔμενε νὰ λὲς
Περασμένα μεγαλεῖα,
Καὶ διηγῶντάς τα νὰ κλαῖς.

Καὶ ἀκαρτέρει, καὶ ἀκαρτέρει
Φιλελεύθερην λαλιά,
𝄆 Ἕνα ἐκτύπαε τἄλλο χέρι
Ἀπὸ τὴν ἀπελπησιά. 𝄇

Κ’ ἔλεες· πότε ἄ! πότε βγάνω
Τὸ κεφάλι ἀπὸ τσ’ ἐρμιαῖς;
Καὶ ἀποκρίνοντο ἀπὸ πάνω
Κλάψαις, ἅλυσσες, φωναῖς.

Τότε ἐσήκονες τὸ βλέμμα
Μὲς τὰ κλαΰματα θολό,
𝄆 Καὶ εἰς τὸ ῥοῦχό σου ἔσταζ’ αἷμα,
Πλῆθος αἷμα Ἑλληνικό. 𝄇

Transliteration

Se gnorízo apó tin kópsi
Tou spathioú tin tromerí,
Se gnorízo apó tin ópsi,
Pou me viá metráei tin gi.

Ap' ta kókkala vgalméni
Ton Hellínon ta hierá,
𝄆 Kai san próta andreioméni,
Khaíre, o khaíre, Eleftheriá! 𝄇

Ekeí mésa ekatoikoúses
Pikraméni entropalí,
K' héna stóma akarteroúses,
Éla páli, na sou pei.

Árgie ná 'lthei ekeíni hi 'méra,
Kai ítan hóla siopilá,
𝄆 Giatí tá 'skiaze hi phovéra
Kai ta plákone hi sklaviá. 𝄇

Dystykhís! parigoría
Móni soú émene na les
Perasména megaleía,
Kai diigóntas ta na klais.

Kai akartérei, kai akartérei
Phileléutherin laliá,
𝄆 Héna ektýpae t' állo khéri
Apó tín apelpisiá. 𝄇

K' élees; póte á! póte vgáno
To kepháli apó ts’ ermiaís;
Kai apokrínonto apó páno
klápsais, hályssais, phonaís.

Tóte esíkones to vlémma
Mes sta klaýmata tholó,
𝄆 Kai eis to rhoúkho sou éstaz’ haíma,
Plíthos haíma Hellinikó. 𝄇

IPA transcription (Note: See Help:IPA/Greek and Modern Greek phonology.)

[s̠e ɣnoˈɾi.z̠o‿aˈpo tiŋ‿ˈɡo.ps̠i |]
[tu s̠paθˈçu tin‿dɾo.meˈɾi |]
[s̠e ɣnoˈɾi.z̠o‿aˈpo tin ˈo.ps̠i |]
[pu me ˈvja meˈtɾaj tin ˈʝi ‖]

[ap ta ˈko.ka.la vɣalˈme.ni |]
[ton eˈli.non‿da jeˈɾa |]
𝄆 [ˈce s̠am‿ˈbɾo.ta an.ðɾjoˈme.ni |]
[ˈçe.ɾe‿o ˈçe.ɾe | e.lef.θeɾˈja ‖] 𝄇

[eˈci ˈme.s̠a‿e.ka.tiˈku.s̠es̠ |]
[pi.kɾaˈme.ni‿en.dɾo.paˈli |]
[ˈc‿e.na ˈs̠to.m‿a.kaɾ.teˈɾu.s̠es̠ |]
[ˈe.la ˈpa.li | na s̠u pi ‖]

[ˈaɾ.ʝe ˈnal.θç‿eˈci.n‿i ˈme.ɾa |]
[ˈce‿i.tan ˈo.la s̠jo.piˈla |]
𝄆 [ʝaˈti ta ˈs̠cça.z̠e‿i foˈve.ɾa |]
[ce ta ˈpla.ko.ne‿i s̠klavˈja ‖] 𝄇

[ði.s̠tiˈçis̠ pa.ɾi.ɣoˈɾi.a |]
[ˈmo.ni ˈs̠u‿e.me.ne na les̠ |]
[pe.ɾaˈz̠me.na me.ɣaˈli.a |]
[ce ðiˈɣon.das̠ ta na kles̠ ‖]

[c‿a.kaɾˈte.ɾi c‿a.kaɾˈte.ɾi |]
[fi.leˈlef.θe.ɾi laˈlja |]
𝄆 [ˈe.na‿ekˈti.pae̯ ˈt‿a.lo ˈçe.ɾi |]
[aˈpo tin a.pel.piˈs̠ja ‖] 𝄇

[ˈc‿e.les̠ ˈpo.te‿a ˈpo.te ˈvɣa.no |]
[to ceˈfa.lj‿aˈpo ts̠‿eɾˈmjes̠ |]
[c‿a.poˈkɾi.non.da‿aˈpo ˈpa.no |]
[ˈkla.ps̠es̠ ˈa.li.s̠es̠ | foˈnes̠ ‖]

[ˈto.t‿eˈs̠i.ko.nes̠ to ˈvle.ma |]
[mes̠ s̠ta ˈklaj.ma.ta ˈθo.lo |]
𝄆 [c‿is̠ to ˈru.xo ˈsu‿e.s̠taz̠ ˈe.ma |]
[ˈpli.θos̠ ˈe.ma e.li.niˈko ‖] 𝄇

Poetic English translation
(Rudyard Kipling, 1918)

We knew thee of old,
O, divinely restored,
By the lights of thine eyes,
And the light of thy Sword.

From the graves of our slain,
Shall thy valor prevail,
𝄆 as we greet thee again,
Hail, Liberty! Hail! 𝄇

Long time didst thou dwell
Mid the peoples that mourn,
Awaiting some voice
That should bid thee return.

Ah, slow broke that day
And no man dared call,
𝄆 For the shadow of tyranny
Lay over all: 𝄇

Yet, behold now thy sons
With impetuous breath
Go forth to the fight
Seeking Freedom or Death.

And we saw thee sad-eyed,
The tears on thy cheeks
𝄆 While thy raiment was dyed
In the blood of the Greeks. 𝄇

Literal English translation

I know you by the direful,
Cutting edge of your keen sword.
I know your eye stare ireful.
Counting fast the lands restored.

You came forth from the departed
Greeks who died and lived for you.
𝄆 And like erstwhile stouthearted,
Hail, O hail! Freedom for you! 𝄇

Thereinside you were dwelling
Reticent, embittered too.
For a summon you were praying
Telling you come back anew.

That good day was always tarrying,
Everything was mute around.
𝄆 For oppression was scaring
And by slavery they were bound. 𝄇

Woe is you! Your only solace,
Sitting lone telling with sigh.
Glories past when you were aweless
And recounting them to cry.

And awaiting and awaiting
A liberal strong voice to dare
𝄆 Your one hand the other smiting
Our of sorrow and despair 𝄇

And you were saying: "When will I ever
Raise my head from these lorn wilds?"
From above replies as ever
Wails, chains, fetters of all kinds.

Then your eyes you'd lift up weeping,
Hazy, full of tears and red,
𝄆 on your dress unendly dripping
gobs of Greek blood vainly shed 𝄇

== Uses ==
An adapted version was used during the short-lived Cretan State as the Cretan Anthem. The "Hymn to Liberty" had been the Greek royal anthem between 1864 and 1924, and again between 1935 and 1973; in both cases, it was discontinued as a royal anthem due to the abolition of the monarchy itself.

"Hymn to Liberty" has been the national anthem of Cyprus since 1966 after an anthem for the Republic of Cyprus, written by Cypriot composer Solonas Michaelides (otherwise known as Solon Michaelides) and shared with Turkish Cypriots, was abandoned in 1963 during intercommunal conflicts.

"Hymn to Liberty" has been performed at every closing ceremony of the Olympic Games, to pay tribute to Greece as the birthplace of the Olympic Games. Most renditions performed during the closing ceremonies are instrumental. Some of the Olympic games the Greek anthem was sung included Sydney, Athens (as Greece was the host country), and Vancouver.

The version commonly played by military bands is an arrangement composed by Lieutenant Colonel Margaritis Kastellis (1907–1979), former director of the Greek Music Corps.
