= Balkan Wars =

1912–1913 conflicts in Balkan states

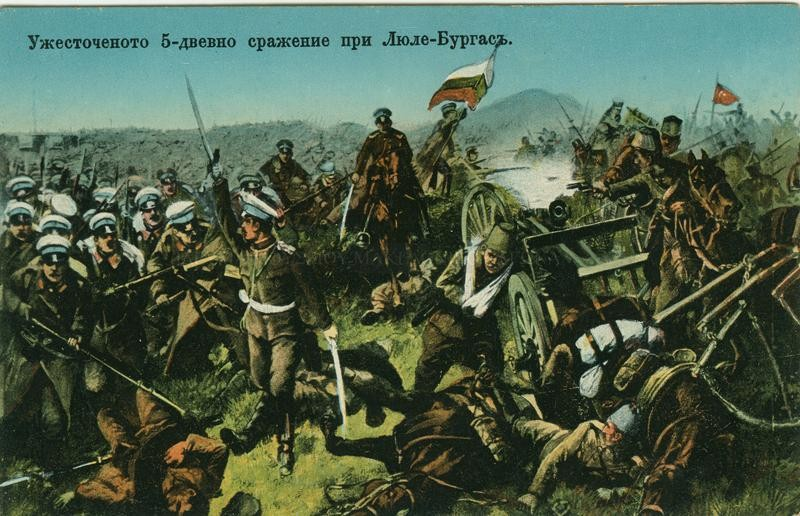
- A Bulgarian postcard depicting the Battle of Lule Burgas.
Date	8 October 1912 – 10 August 1913 (9 months, 1 week and 3 days) First Balkan War: 8 October 1912 – 30 May 1913 (7 months, 3 weeks and 1 day); Second Balkan War: 16 June – 10 August 1913 (1 month, 1 week and 5 days)
Location	Adrianople; Scutari; Kosovo; Manastir; Salonica provinces; Aegean Islands; Aegean Sea
Result	First Balkan War: Balkan League victory; Treaty of London; Second Balkan War: Bulgarian defeat; Treaty of Bucharest; Treaty of Constantinople

Belligerents
First Balkan War: Ottoman Empire	First Balkan War: Bulgaria; Serbia; Greece; Montenegro
Second Balkan War: Bulgaria	Second Balkan War: Serbia; Romania; Greece; Montenegro; Ottoman Empire

Commanders and leaders
(Ottoman Empire) Mehmed V; (Ottoman Empire) Mahmud Şevket Pasha X; (Ottoman Empire) Enver Pasha; (Ottoman Empire) Nazım Pasha; (Ottoman Empire) Zeki Pasha; (Ottoman Empire) Abdul Kerim Pasha; (Ottoman Empire) Kölemen Abdullah Pasha; (Ottoman Empire) Hasan Tahsin Pasha (surrendered); (Ottoman Empire) Rauf Pasha; (Tsardom of Bulgaria (1908–1946)) Ferdinand I; (Tsardom of Bulgaria (1908–1946)) Mihail Savov; (Tsardom of Bulgaria (1908–1946)) Vasil Kutinchev; (Tsardom of Bulgaria (1908–1946)) Nikola Ivanov; (Tsardom of Bulgaria (1908–1946)) Radko Dimitriev; (Tsardom of Bulgaria (1908–1946)) Stiliyan Kovachev; (Tsardom of Bulgaria (1908–1946)) Stefan Toshev; (Tsardom of Bulgaria (1908–1946)) Racho Petrov; (Tsardom of Bulgaria (1908–1946)) Vicho Dikov	(Tsardom of Bulgaria (1908–1946)) Ferdinand I; (Tsardom of Bulgaria (1908–1946)) Mihail Savov; (Tsardom of Bulgaria (1908–1946)) Ivan Fichev; (Tsardom of Bulgaria (1908–1946)) Vasil Kutinchev; (Tsardom of Bulgaria (1908–1946)) Nikola Ivanov; (Tsardom of Bulgaria (1908–1946)) Radko Dimitriev; (Tsardom of Bulgaria (1908–1946)) Stiliyan Kovachev; (Kingdom of Serbia) Radomir Putnik; (Kingdom of Serbia) Petar Bojović; (Kingdom of Serbia) Stepa Stepanović; (Kingdom of Greece) Eleftherios Venizelos; (Kingdom of Greece) Crown Prince Constantine; (Kingdom of Greece) Pavlos Kountouriotis; (Kingdom of Montenegro) Nicholas I; (Kingdom of Montenegro) Prince Danilo Petrović; (Kingdom of Serbia) Radomir Putnik; (Kingdom of Serbia) Petar Bojović; (Kingdom of Serbia) Stepa Stepanović; (Kingdom of Greece) Eleftherios Venizelos; (Kingdom of Greece) Crown Prince Constantine; (Kingdom of Greece) Pavlos Kountouriotis; (Kingdom of Montenegro) Nicholas I; (Kingdom of Montenegro) Prince Danilo Petrović; (Kingdom of Romania) Carol I; (Kingdom of Romania) Ferdinand I; (Kingdom of Romania) Alexandru Averescu; (Ottoman Empire) Mehmed V; (Ottoman Empire) Enver Pasha; (Ottoman Empire) Ahmed Izzet Pasha

Strength
(Ottoman Empire) 437,000+ (Tsardom of Bulgaria (1908–1946)) 600,000+	(Tsardom of Bulgaria (1908–1946)) 450,000+ (Kingdom of Serbia) 230,000 (Kingdom of Greece) 125,000 (Kingdom of Montenegro) 44,500; Total: 850,000 men (Kingdom of Serbia) 348,000 (Kingdom of Romania) 330,000 (Ottoman Empire) 255,000 (Kingdom of Greece) 148,000 (Kingdom of Montenegro) 12,800 Total: 1,093,800 men

Casualties and losses
- For civilian casualties, see: First Balkan War § Atrocities and migrations Second Balkan War § Atrocities and migrations

The Balkan Wars were two conflicts that took place in the Balkan states in 1912 and 1913. In the First Balkan War, the four Balkan states of Greece, Serbia, Montenegro and Bulgaria declared war upon the Ottoman Empire and defeated it, in the process stripping the Ottomans of their European provinces, leaving only Eastern Thrace under Ottoman control. In the Second Balkan War, Bulgaria fought against the other four combatants of the first war. It also faced an attack from Romania from the north. The Ottoman Empire lost the bulk of its territory in Europe. Although not involved as a combatant, Austria-Hungary became relatively weaker as a much enlarged Serbia pushed for union of the South Slavic peoples. The war set the stage for the July crisis of 1914 and was a prelude to the First World War.

By the early 20th century, Bulgaria, Greece, Montenegro and Serbia had achieved independence from the Ottoman Empire, but large elements of their ethnic populations remained under Ottoman rule. Over the course of the Macedonian Struggle these states fought for influence between themselves and the Ottoman government within Ottoman Macedonia, during which their governments came under the control of nationalists. In 1912, these countries united to form the Balkan League. The First Balkan War began on 8 October 1912, when the League member states attacked the Ottoman Empire, and ended eight months later with the signing on 30 May 1913 of the Treaty of London negotiated together with the Great Powers. The Great Powers—particularly Italy and Austria-Hungary—included independence for Albania in the Treaty. The Second Balkan War began on 16 June 1913, when Bulgaria, dissatisfied with its allotment of territory from Macedonia, attacked its former Balkan League allies. The combined forces of the Serbian and Greek armies, with their superior numbers repelled the Bulgarian offensive and counter-attacked by invading Bulgaria from the west and the south. Romania, having taken no part in the first conflict, had intact armies to strike with and invaded Bulgaria from the north in violation of a peace treaty between the two states. The Ottoman Empire also attacked Bulgaria and advanced in Thrace, regaining Adrianople. In the resulting Treaty of Bucharest, Bulgaria managed to retain most of the territories it had gained in the First Balkan War. However, it was forced to cede the ex-Ottoman south part of Dobruja province to Romania.

The Balkan Wars were marked by ethnic cleansing, with all parties being responsible for grave atrocities against civilians, and inspired later atrocities including war crimes during the 1990s Yugoslav Wars.

== Background ==
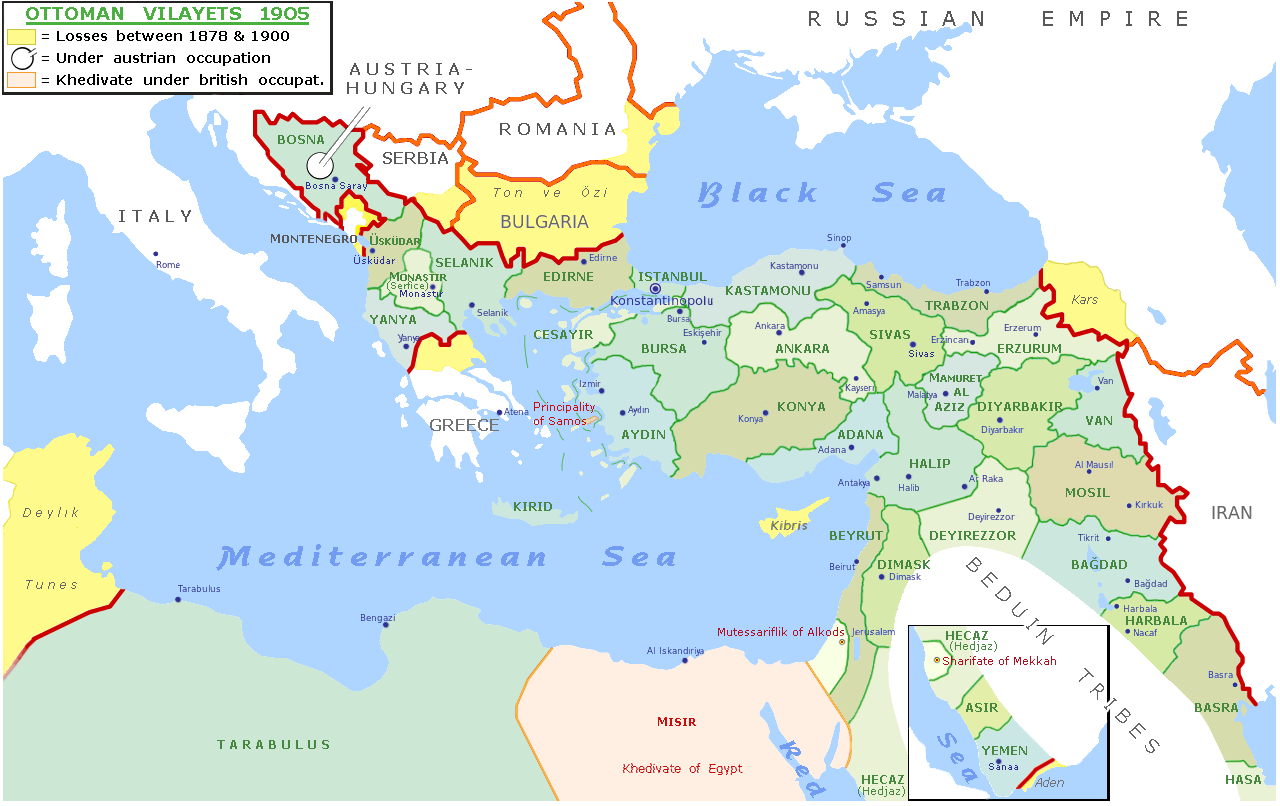
Map of the Ottoman Empire in 1900, with the names of the Ottoman provinces.

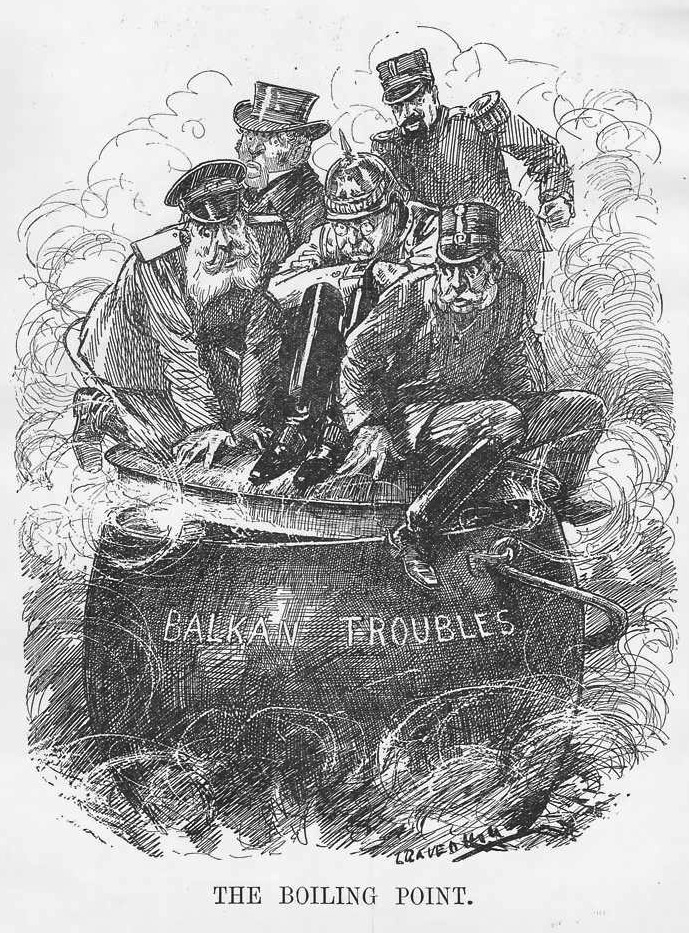
A Punch cartoon of October 2, 1912, by English cartoonist Leonard Raven-Hill depicting Britain, France, Germany, Austria-Hungary, and Russia sitting on a lid on top of a pot marked "Balkan Troubles", satirizing the situation in the Balkans leading up to the First Balkan War

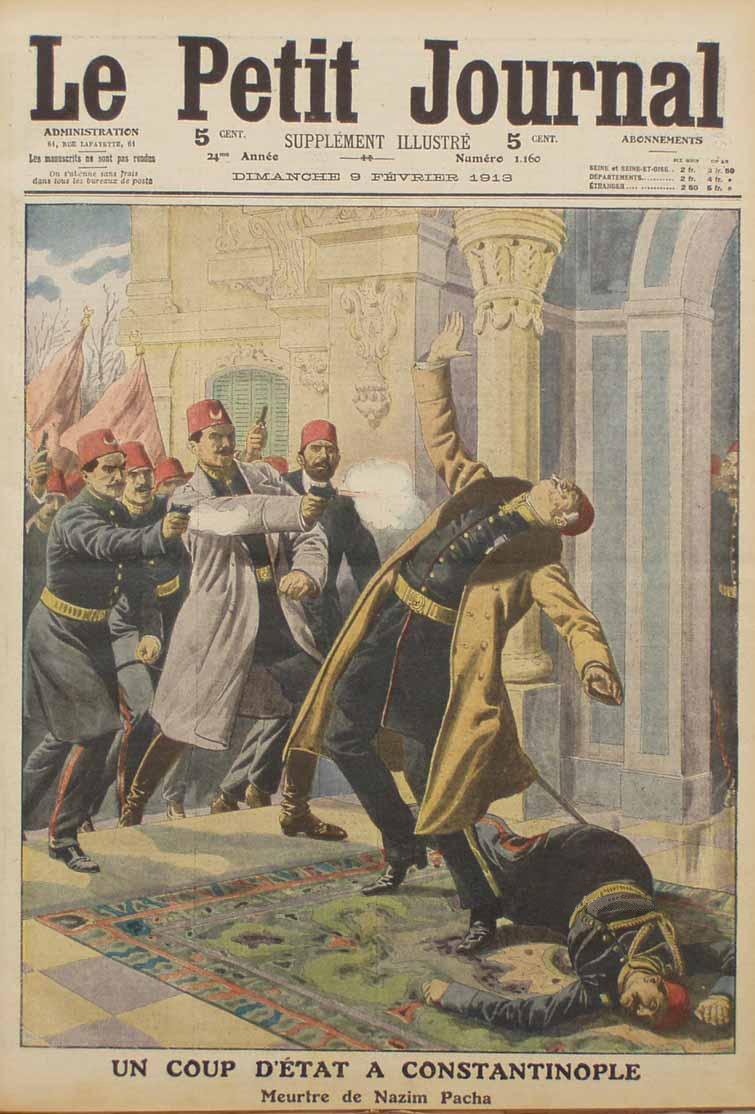
Nazım Pasha, the chief of staff of the Ottoman army, was assassinated in January 1913 by Young Turks due to his failure.

The background to the wars lies in the incomplete emergence of nation-states on the European territory of the Ottoman Empire during the second half of the 19th century. Serbia had gained substantial territory during the Russo-Turkish War (1877–1878), while Greece acquired Thessaly in 1881 (although it lost a small area back to the Ottoman Empire in 1897) and Bulgaria (an autonomous principality since 1878) incorporated the formerly distinct province of Eastern Rumelia (1885). All three countries, as well as Montenegro, sought additional territories within the large Ottoman-ruled region known as Rumelia, comprising Eastern Rumelia, Albania, Macedonia, and Thrace.

The First Balkan War had some main causes, which included:

1. The Ottoman Empire was unable to reform itself, govern satisfactorily, or deal with the rising ethnic nationalism of its diverse peoples.
2. The loss of Libya to Italy in 1911 and the revolts in the Albanian Provinces showed that the Empire was deeply "wounded" and unable to strike back against another war.
3. The Great Powers quarreled amongst themselves and failed to ensure that the Ottomans would carry out the needed reforms. This led the Balkan states to impose their own solution.
4. The Christian populations of the European part of the Ottoman Empire were oppressed by the Ottoman Reign, thus forcing the Christian Balkan states to take action.
5. Most importantly, the Balkan League was formed, and its members were confident a coordinated and simultaneous declaration of war on the Ottoman Empire would allow all of them to expand their territories in the Balkan Peninsula even though they had not arrived in advance on an agreement with each other or with the interested Great Powers, Austrian-Hungary and Italy, on how Ottoman territory would be divided.

=== Policies of the Great Powers ===
Throughout the 19th century, the Great Powers shared different aims over the "Eastern Question" and the integrity of the Ottoman Empire. Russia wanted access to the "warm waters" of the Mediterranean from the Black Sea; so, it pursued a pan-Slavic foreign policy and therefore supported Bulgaria and Serbia. Britain wished to deny Russia access to the "warm waters" and supported the integrity of the Ottoman Empire, although it also supported a limited expansion of Greece as a backup plan in case integrity of the Ottoman Empire was not possible. France wished to strengthen its position in the region, especially in the Levant.

Habsburg-ruled Austria-Hungary wished for a continuation of the existence of the Ottoman Empire, since both were troubled multinational entities and thus the collapse of the one might weaken the other. The Habsburgs also saw a strong Ottoman presence in the area as a counterweight to the Serbian nationalistic call to their own Serb subjects in Bosnia, Vojvodina and other parts of the empire. Italy's primary aim at the time seems to have been the denial of access to the Adriatic Sea to another major sea power. The German Empire, in turn, under the "Drang nach Osten" policy, aspired to turn the Ottoman Empire into its own de facto colony, and thus supported its integrity. In the late 19th and early 20th century, Bulgaria and Greece contended for Ottoman Macedonia and Thrace. Ethnic Greeks sought the forced "Hellenization" of ethnic Bulgars, who sought "Bulgarization" of Greeks (Rise of nationalism). Both nations sent armed irregulars into Ottoman territory to protect and assist their ethnic kindred. From 1904, there was low-intensity warfare in Macedonia between the Greek and Bulgarian bands and the Ottoman army (the Struggle for Macedonia). After the Young Turk revolution of July 1908, the situation changed drastically.

=== Young Turk Revolution ===
The 1908 Young Turk Revolution saw the reinstatement of constitutional monarchy in the Ottoman Empire and the start of the Second Constitutional Era. When the revolt broke out, it was supported by intellectuals, the army, and almost all the ethnic minorities of the Empire. It forced Sultan Abdul Hamid II to re-adopt the defunct Ottoman constitution of 1876 and parliament. Hopes were raised among the Balkan ethnicities of reforms and autonomy. Elections were held to form a representative, multi-ethnic, Ottoman parliament. However, following the Sultan's failed counter-coup of 1909, the liberal element of the Young Turks was sidelined and the nationalist element became dominant.

In October 1908, Austria-Hungary seized the opportunity of the Ottoman political upheaval to annex the de jure Ottoman province of Bosnia and Herzegovina, which it had occupied since 1878 (see Bosnian Crisis). Bulgaria declared independence as it had done in 1878, but this time the independence was internationally recognized. The Greeks of the autonomous Cretan State proclaimed unification with Greece, though the opposition of the Great Powers prevented the latter action from taking practical effect.

=== Reaction in the Balkan states ===
Serbia was frustrated in the north by Austria-Hungary's incorporation of Bosnia. In March 1909, Serbia was forced to accept the annexation and restrain anti-Habsburg agitation by Serbian nationalists. Instead, the Serbian government (PM: Nikola Pašić) looked to formerly Serb territories in the south, notably "Old Serbia" (the Sanjak of Novi Pazar and the province of Kosovo).

On 15 August 1909, the Military League, a group of Greek officers, launched a coup. The Military League sought the creation of a new political system and thus summoned the Cretan politician Eleftherios Venizelos to Athens as its political advisor. Venizelos persuaded King George I to revise the constitution and asked the League to disband in favor of a National Assembly. In March 1910, the Military League dissolved itself.

Bulgaria, which had secured Ottoman recognition of her independence in April 1909 and enjoyed the friendship of Russia, also looked to annex districts of Ottoman Thrace and Macedonia. In August 1910, Montenegro followed Bulgaria's precedent by becoming a kingdom.

=== Pre-War treaties ===
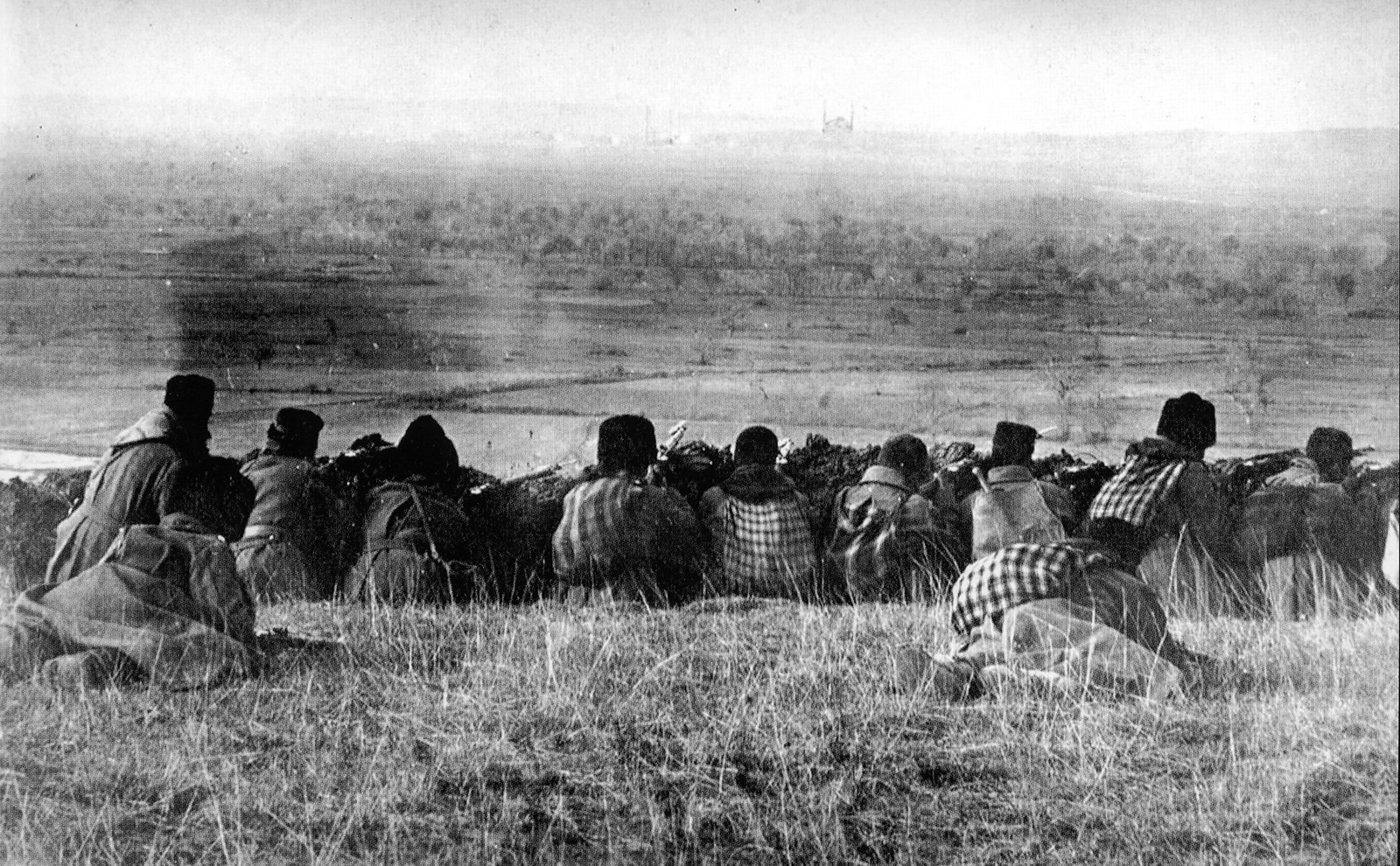
Bulgarian forces waiting to start their assault on Adrianople

Following the Italian victory in the Italo-Turkish War of 1911–1912, the severity of the Ottomanizing policy of the Young Turkish regime and a series of three revolts in Ottoman held Albania, the Young Turks fell from power after a coup. The Christian Balkan countries were forced to take action and saw this as an opportunity to promote their national agenda by expanding in the territories of the falling empire and liberating their enslaved co-patriots. In order to achieve that, a wide net of treaties was constructed and an alliance was formed.

The negotiation among the Balkan states' governments started in the latter part of 1911 and was all conducted in secret. The treaties and military conventions were published in French translations after the Balkan Wars on 24–26 of November in Le Matin, Paris, France In April 1911, Greek PM Eleutherios Venizelos' attempt to reach an agreement with the Bulgarian PM and form a defensive alliance against the Ottoman Empire was fruitless, because of the doubts the Bulgarians held on the strength of the Greek Army. Later that year, in December 1911, Bulgaria and Serbia agreed to start negotiations in forming an alliance under the tight inspection of Russia. The treaty between Serbia and Bulgaria was signed on 29 of February/13 of March 1912. Serbia sought expansion to "Old Serbia" and as Milan Milovanovich noted in 1909 to the Bulgarian counterpart, "As long as we are not allied with you, our influence over the Croats and Slovens will be insignificant". On the other side, Bulgaria wanted the autonomy of Macedonia region under the influence of the two countries. The then Bulgarian Minister of Foreign Affairs General Stefan Paprikov stated in 1909 that, "It will be clear that if not today then tomorrow, the most important issue will again be the Macedonian Question. And this question, whatever happens, cannot be decided without more or less direct participation of the Balkan States". Last but not least, they noted down the divisions that should be made of the Ottoman territories after a victorious outcome of the war. Bulgaria would gain all the territories eastern of Rodopi Mountains and River Strimona, while Serbia would annex the territories northern and western of Mount Skardu.

The alliance pact between Greece and Bulgaria was finally signed on 16/29 of May 1912, without stipulating any specific division of Ottoman territories. In summer 1912, Greece proceeded on making "gentlemen's agreements" with Serbia and Montenegro. Despite the fact that a draft of the alliance pact with Serbia was submitted on 22 of October, a formal pact was never signed due to the outbreak of the war. As a result, Greece did not have any territorial or other commitments, other than the common cause to fight the Ottoman Empire.

In April 1912 Montenegro and Bulgaria reached an agreement including financial aid to Montenegro in case of war with the Ottoman Empire. A gentlemen's agreement with Greece was reached soon after, as mentioned before. By the end of September a political and military alliance between Montenegro and Serbia was achieved. By the end of September 1912, Bulgaria had formal-written alliances with Serbia, Greece, and Montenegro. A formal alliance was also signed between Serbia and Montenegro, while Greco-Montenegrin and Greco-Serbian agreements were basically oral "gentlemen's agreements". All these completed the formation of the Balkan League.

=== Balkan League ===
At that time, the Balkan states had been able to maintain armies that were both numerous, in relation to each country's population, and eager to act, being inspired by the idea that they would free enslaved parts of their homeland. The Bulgarian Army was the leading army of the coalition. It was a well-trained and fully equipped army, capable of facing the Imperial Army. It was suggested that the bulk of the Bulgarian Army would be in the Thracian front, as it was expected that the front near the Ottoman Capital would be the most crucial one. The Serbian Army would act on the Macedonian front, as the Greek Army were thought to be powerless, but Greece was needed in the Balkan League for its navy and its capability to dominate the Aegean Sea, cutting off the Ottoman Armies from reinforcements.

On 13 (O.S.)/26 of September 1912, the Ottoman mobilization in Thrace forced Serbia and Bulgaria to act and order their own mobilization. On 17/30 of September Greece also ordered mobilization. On 25 of September/8 of October, Montenegro declared war on the Ottoman Empire, after negotiations failed regarding the border status. On 30 of September/13 of October, the ambassadors of Serbia, Bulgaria, and Greece delivered the common ultimatum to the Ottoman government, which was immediately rejected. The Empire withdrew its ambassadors from Sofia, Belgrade, and Athens, while the Bulgarian, Serbian and Greek diplomats left the Ottoman capital delivering the war declaration on 4/17 of October 1912.

== First Balkan War ==
The three Slavic allies (Bulgaria, Serbia, and Montenegro) had laid out extensive plans to coordinate their war efforts, in continuation of their secret prewar settlements and under close Russian supervision (Greece was not included). Serbia and Montenegro would attack in the theater of Sanjak, Bulgaria, and Serbia in Macedonia and Thrace.

The Ottoman Empire's situation was difficult. Its population of about 26 million people provided a massive pool of manpower, but three-quarters of the population lived in the Asian part of the Empire. Reinforcements had to come from Asia mainly by sea, which depended on the result of battles between the Turkish and Greek navies in the Aegean.

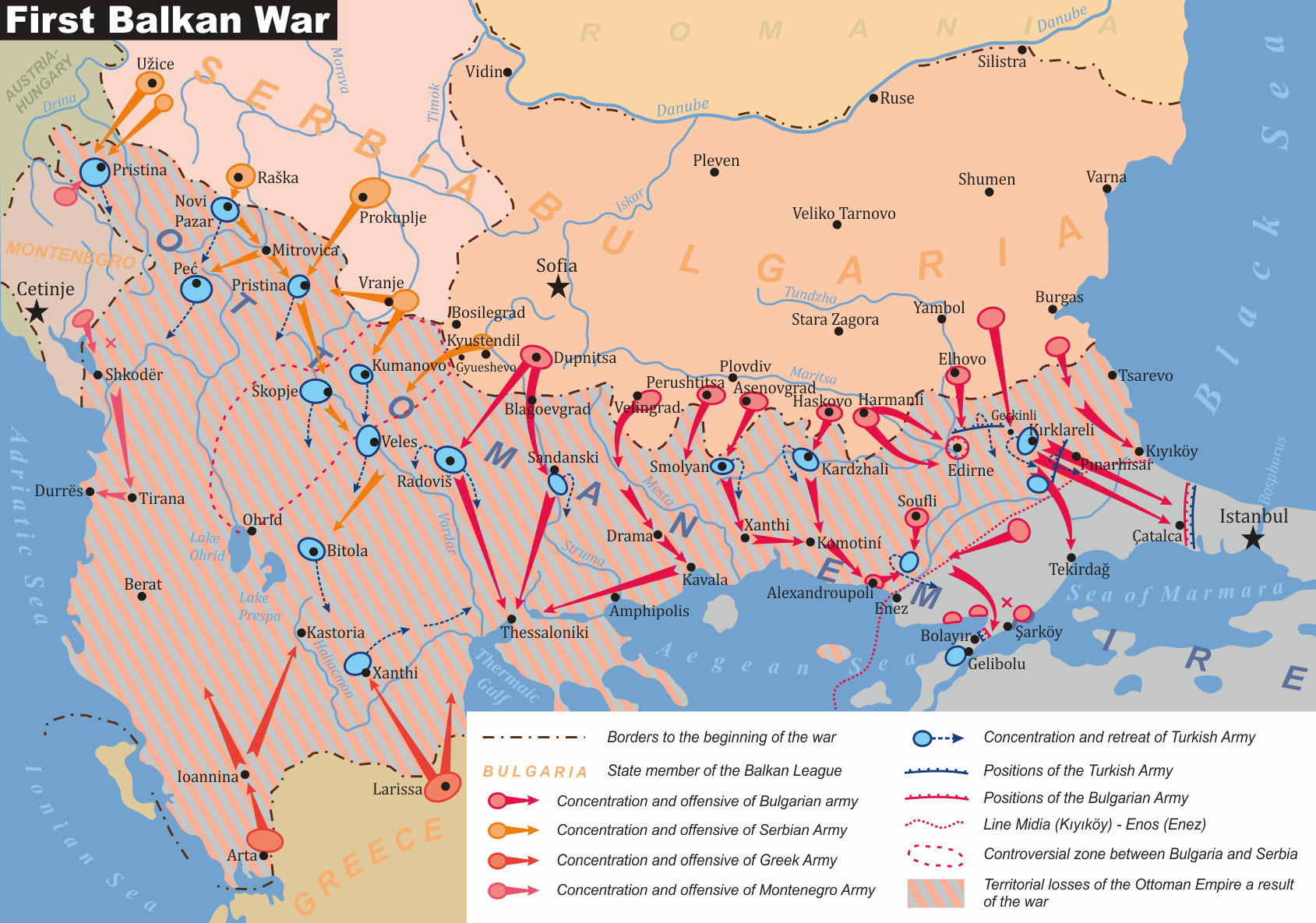
Map of the First Balkan War

With the outbreak of the war, the Ottoman Empire activated three Army HQs: the Thracian HQ in Constantinople, the Western HQ in Salonika, and the Vardar HQ in Skopje, against the Bulgarians, the Greeks and the Serbians respectively. Most of their available forces were allocated to these fronts. Smaller independent units were allocated elsewhere, mostly around heavily fortified cities.

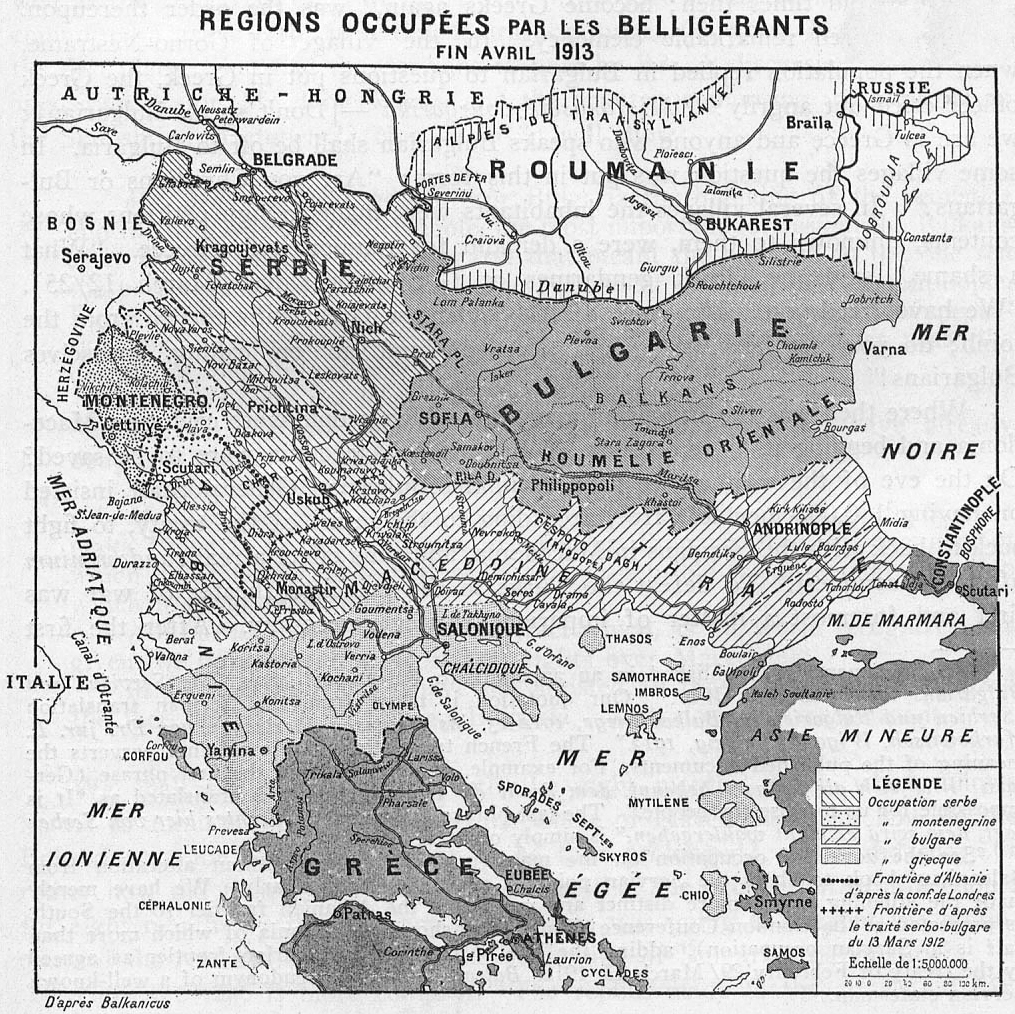
Territorial changes as a result of the First Balkan war, as of April 1913 showing the prewar agreed line of expansion between Serbia and Bulgaria

Montenegro was the first to declare war on 8 October (25 September O.S.). Its main thrust was towards Shkodra, with secondary operations in the Novi Pazar area. The rest of the Allies, after giving a common ultimatum, declared war a week later. Bulgaria attacked towards Eastern Thrace, being stopped only at the outskirts of Constantinople at the Çatalca line and the isthmus of the Gallipoli peninsula, while secondary forces captured Western Thrace and Eastern Macedonia. Serbia attacked south towards Skopje and Monastir and then turned west to present-day Albania, reaching the Adriatic, while a second Army captured Kosovo and linked with the Montenegrin forces. Greece's main forces attacked from Thessaly into Macedonia through the Sarantaporo strait. On 7 November, in response to an Ottoman initiative, they entered into negotiations for the surrender of Thessaloniki. With the Greeks already there, and the Bulgarian 7th Rila Division moving swiftly from the north towards Thessaloniki, Hassan Tahsin Pasha considered his position to be hopeless. The Greeks offered more attractive terms than the Bulgarians did. On 8 November, Tahsin Pasha agreed to terms and 26,000 Ottoman troops passed over into Greek captivity. Before the Greeks entered the city, a German warship whisked the former sultan Abdul Hamid II out of Thessaloniki to continue his exile, across the Bosporus from Constantinople. With their army in Thessaloniki, the Greeks took new positions to the east and northeast, including Nigrita. On 12 November (on 26 October 1912, O.S.) Greece expanded its occupied area and teamed up with the Serbian army to the northwest, while its main forces turned east towards Kavala, reaching the Bulgarians. Another Greek army attacked into Epirus towards Ioannina.

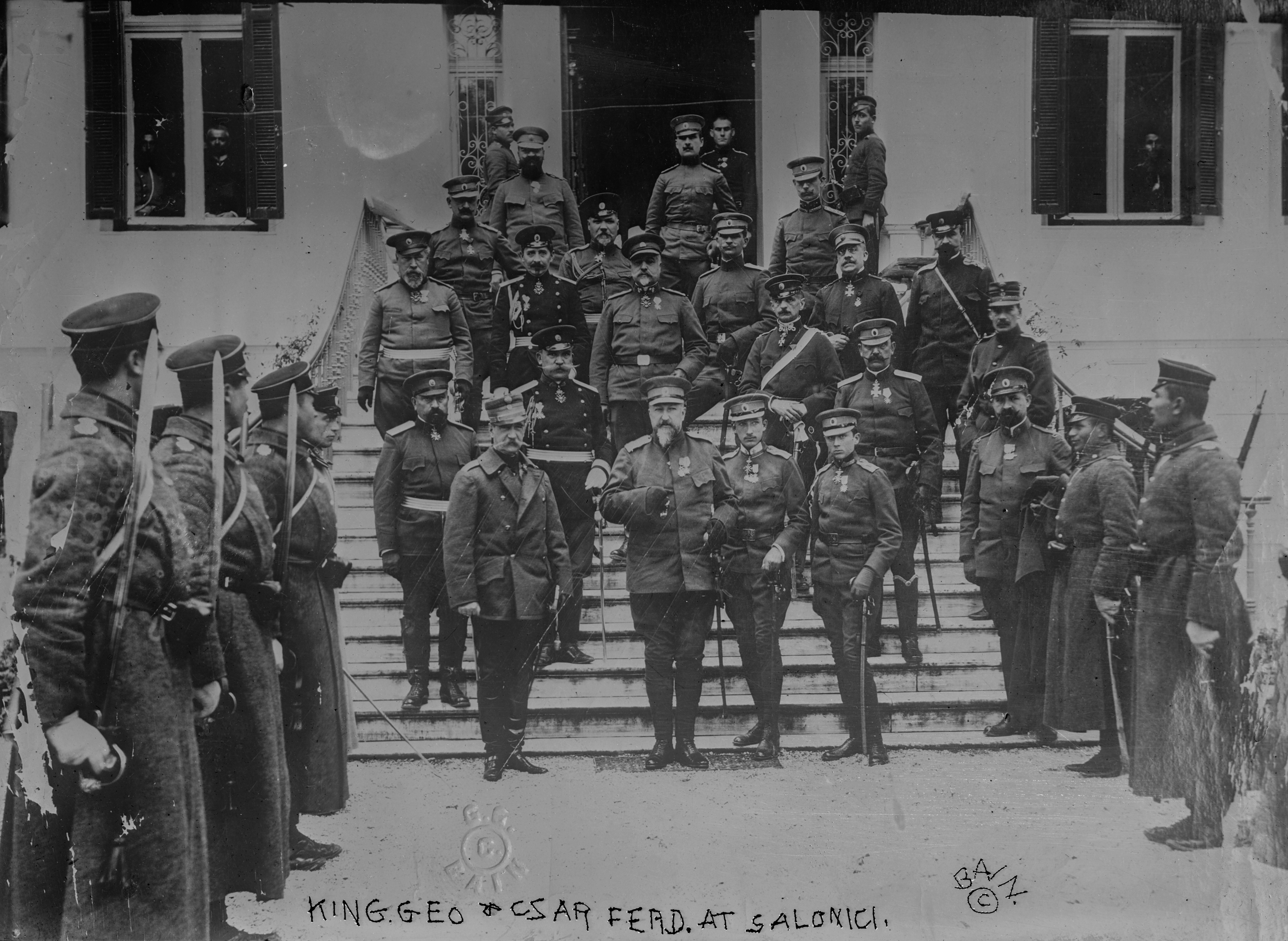
The apple of discord: King George I of Greece and Tsar Ferdinand of Bulgaria at Thessaloniki, December 1912. Despite their alliance, Greco-Bulgarian antagonism over the city and Macedonia did not abate.

On the naval front, the Ottoman fleet twice exited the Dardanelles and was twice defeated by the Greek Navy, in the battles of Elli and Lemnos. Greek dominance on the Aegean Sea made it impossible for the Ottomans to transfer the planned troops from the Middle East to the Thracian (against the Bulgarian) and to the Macedonian (against the Greeks and Serbians) fronts. According to E.J. Erickson the Greek Navy also played a crucial, albeit indirect role, in the Thracian campaign by neutralizing no less than three Thracian Corps (see First Balkan War, the Bulgarian theater of operations), a significant portion of the Ottoman Army there, in the all-important opening round of the war. After the defeat of the Ottoman fleet, the Greek Navy was also free to occupy the islands of the Aegean. General Nikola Ivanov identified the activity of the Greek Navy as the chief factor in the general success of the allies.

In January, after a successful coup by young army officers, the Ottoman Empire decided to continue the war. After a failed Ottoman counter-attack in the Western-Thracian front, Bulgarian forces, with the help of the Serbian Army, managed to conquer Adrianople, while Greek forces managed to take Ioannina after defeating the Ottomans in the Battle of Bizani. In the joint Serbian-Montenegrin theater of operation, the Montenegrin army besieged and captured the Shkodra, ending the Ottoman presence in Europe west of the Çatalca line after nearly 500 years. The war ended officially with the Treaty of London on 30(17) May 1913.

== Prelude to the Second Balkan War ==
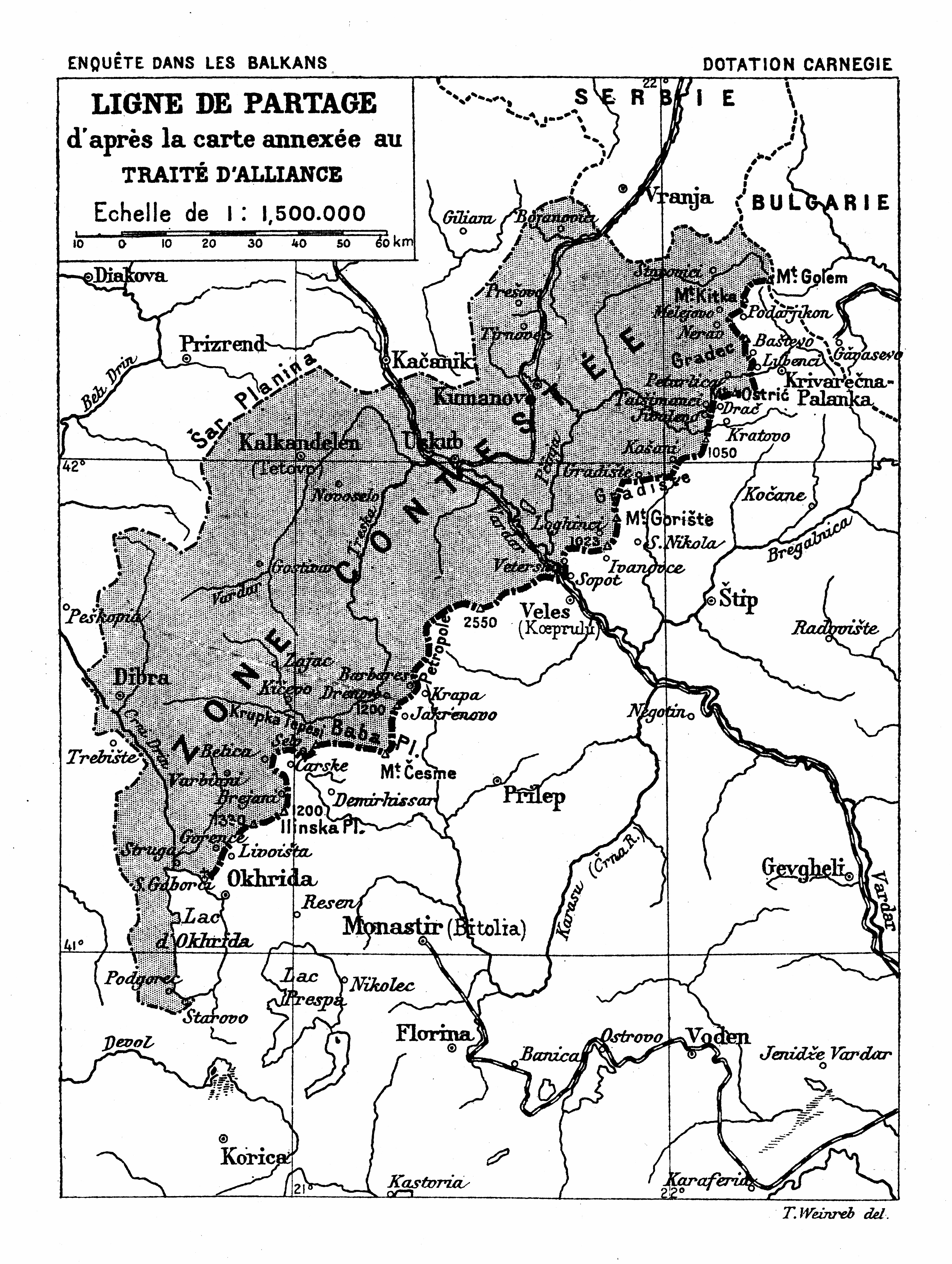
The Serbo-Bulgarian pre-war agreement on the division of Macedonia, with the Contested Zone marked in grey

After pressure from the Great Powers towards Greece and Serbia, who had postponed signing in order to fortify their defensive positions, the signing of the Treaty of London took place on 30 May 1913. With this treaty, the war between the Balkan Allies and the Ottoman Empire came to an end. From now on, the Great Powers had the right of decision on the territorial adjustments that had to be made, which even led to the creation of an independent Albania. Every Aegean island belonging to the Ottoman Empire, with the exception of Imbros and Tenedos, was handed over to the Greeks, including the island of Crete.

Furthermore, all European territory of the Ottoman Empire west of the Enos-Midiya (Enez-Kıyıköy) line, was ceded to the Balkan League, but the division of the territory among the League was not to be decided by the Treaty itself.

This event led to the formation of two 'de facto' military occupation zones on Macedonian territory, as Greece and Serbia tried to create a common border. In turn, Bulgarians were furious about Serbia's refusal to honour its commitments under the 1912 Serbo-Bulgarian Treaty, which had split the geographic region of Macedonia into two zones, one contested between Serbia and Bulgaria, and another one, recognised by the two countries as Bulgarian by rights.

Before the war, Serbia had relinquished its claim to the territory east of the Ohrid-Kriva Palanka line in favour of Bulgaria (the Uncontested Zone), while the future of some 11,000 square km^{2} of territory, forming the northwestern corner of geographic region of Macedonia (the Contested Zone), was to be decided by the Russian Emperor, who was Senior Arbitrary and Guarantor of the alliance.

Assured by the clauses of the Treaty that it would receive what it considered its fair share of Macedonia, Bulgaria sent almost all of its troops to the Thracian front, which was expected to, and eventually did indeed, decide the outcome of the war. At the same time, Serbia pushed into Kosovo and northern Macedonia.

As the establishment of an independent Albanian state, brokered by Italy and Austria-Hungary, deprived the Serbs of their much-coveted Adriatic port, they demanded not only the entire Contested Zone, but also all of the Uncontested one they had occupied. Bulgarian efforts to appeal to the Russian Emperor, quoting, for example, the clauses of the Treaty, the material difference between Serbian (29,698) and Bulgarian casualties (87,926) or the surrender of the Bulgarian City of Silistra to Romania as compensation for its continued neutrality proved futile. Russian Foreign Minister Sergey Sazonov instead kept encouraging Bulgaria to accede to an ever-increasing list of Serbian demands.

In the end, Bulgaria's overreliance on the Russian Empire, a power which had anathemised the Unification of Bulgaria, invited the Ottoman Sultan to reconquer Eastern Rumelia and organised a coup against the Bulgarian Prince only three decades prior and which had watched Ferdinand's charge towards Istanbul with ill-disguised alarm due to its own long-standing aspirations towards the Turkish Straits, Bulgaria's unwillingness to reach a compromise with Greece, despite several attempts made by Greek Prime Minister Venizelos, and Serbian insistence to keep all conquered territory paved the way to another conflict.

On 1 May 1913, Greece and Serbia settled their differences and signed a military alliance directed against Bulgaria. On the night of 29 June 1913, the Bulgarian army made an ill-advised attempt to gain an advantage in the negotiations by pushing out Serbian and Greek forces out of several disputed territories without a battle plan or declaration of war, naively thinking that this would be regarded as a mere altercation. Instead, the action gave Serbia and Greece casus belli and kicked off the Second Balkan War.

== Second Balkan War ==
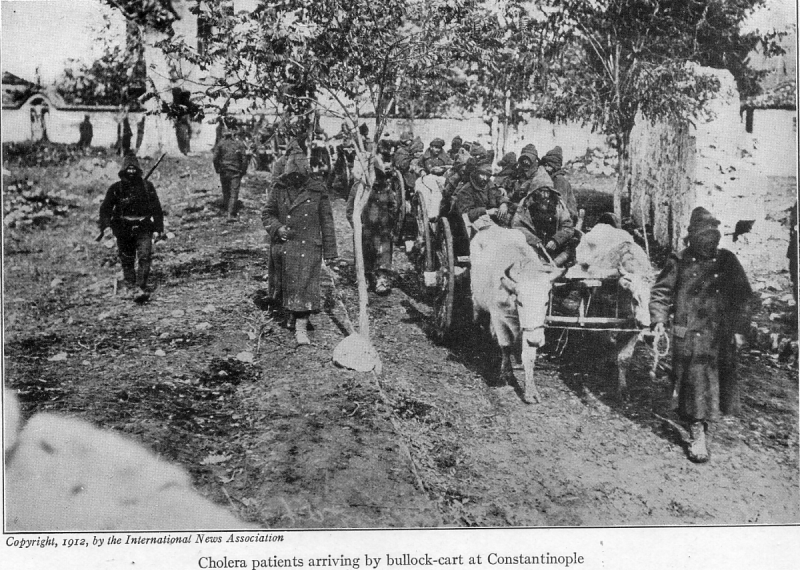
Cholera was common among the soldiers of the combatant nations

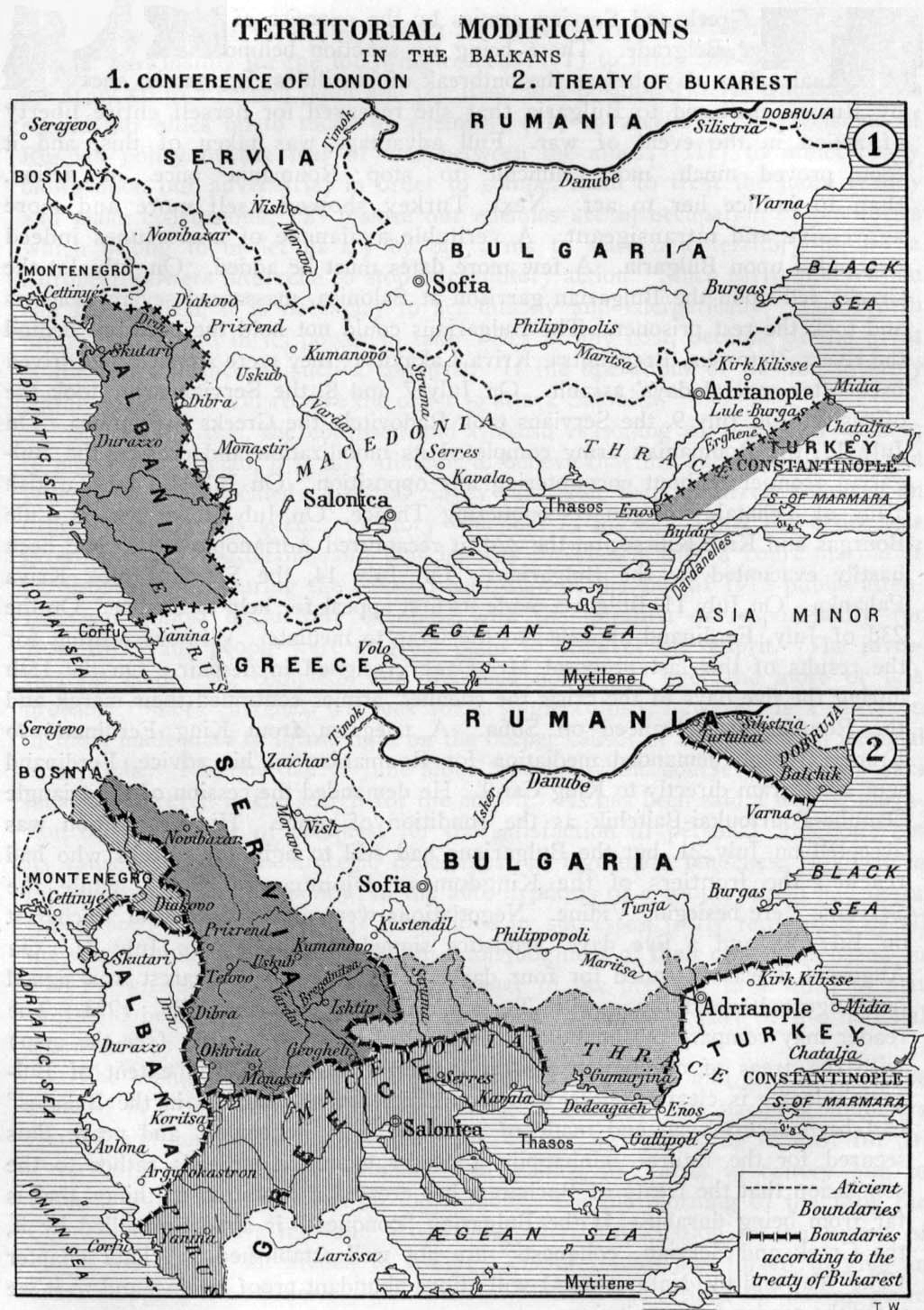
Boundaries on the Balkans after the First and the Second Balkan War (1912–1913)

Though the Balkan allies had fought together against the common enemy, that was not enough to overcome their mutual rivalries. In the original document for the Balkans league, Serbia promised Bulgaria most of Macedonia. But before the first war had come to an end, Serbia (in violation of the previous agreement) and Greece revealed their plan to keep possession of the territories that their forces had occupied. This act prompted the tsar of Bulgaria to invade his allies. The Second Balkan War broke out on 29 (16) June 1913, when Bulgaria attacked its erstwhile allies in the First Balkan War, Serbia and Greece, while Montenegro and the Ottoman Empire intervened later against Bulgaria, with Romania attacking Bulgaria from the north in violation of a peace treaty.

When the Greek army had entered Thessaloniki in the First Balkan War ahead of the Bulgarian 7th division by only a day, they were asked to allow a Bulgarian battalion to enter the city. Greece accepted in exchange for allowing a Greek unit to enter the city of Serres. The Bulgarian unit that entered Thessaloniki turned out to be an 18,000-strong division instead of the battalion, which caused concern among the Greeks, who viewed it as a Bulgarian attempt to establish a condominium over the city. In the event, due to the urgently needed reinforcements in the Thracian front, Bulgarian Headquarters was soon forced to remove its troops from the city (while the Greeks agreed by mutual treaty to remove their units based in Serres) and transport them to Dedeağaç (modern Alexandroupolis), but it left behind a battalion that started fortifying its positions.

Greece had also allowed the Bulgarians to control the stretch of the Thessaloniki-Constantinople railroad that lay in Greek-occupied territory since Bulgaria controlled the largest part of this railroad towards Thrace. After the end of the operations in Thrace, and confirming Greek concerns, Bulgaria was not satisfied with the territory it controlled in Macedonia and immediately asked Greece to relinquish its control over Thessaloniki and the land north of Pieria, effectively handing over all of Greek Macedonia. These demands, with the Bulgarian refusal to demobilize its army after the Treaty of London had ended the common war against the Ottomans, alarmed Greece, which decided to also keep its army mobilized. A month after the Second Balkan War started, the Bulgarian community of Thessaloniki no longer existed, as hundreds of long-time Bulgarian locals were arrested. Thirteen hundred Bulgarian soldiers and about five hundred komitadjis were also arrested and transferred to Greek prisons. In November 1913, the Bulgarians were forced to admit their defeat, as the Greeks received international recognition on their claim of Thessaloniki.

Similarly, in modern North Macedonia, the tension between Serbia and Bulgaria due to the latter's aspirations over Vardar Macedonia generated many incidents between their respective armies, prompting Serbia to keep its army mobilized. Serbia and Greece proposed that each of the three countries reduce its army by a quarter, as the first step towards a peaceful solution, but Bulgaria rejected it. Seeing the omens, Greece and Serbia started a series of negotiations and signed a treaty on 1 June(19 May) 1913. With this treaty, a mutual border was agreed between the two countries, together with an agreement for mutual military and diplomatic support in case of a Bulgarian or/and Austro-Hungarian attack. Tsar Nicholas II of Russia, being well informed, tried to stop the upcoming conflict on 8 June, by sending an identical personal message to the Kings of Bulgaria and Serbia, offering to act as arbitrator according to the provisions of the 1912 Serbo-Bulgarian treaty. But Bulgaria, by making the acceptance of Russian arbitration conditional, in effect denied any discussion, causing Russia to repudiate its alliance with Bulgaria (see Russo-Bulgarian military convention signed 31 May 1902).

The Serbs and the Greeks had a military advantage on the eve of the war because their armies confronted comparatively weak Ottoman forces in the First Balkan War and suffered relatively light casualties, while the Bulgarians were involved in heavy fighting in Thrace. The Serbs and Greeks had time to fortify their positions in Macedonia. The Bulgarians also held some advantages, controlling internal communication and supply lines.

On 29(16) June 1913, General Savov, under direct orders of Tsar Ferdinand I, issued attack orders against both Greece and Serbia without consulting the Bulgarian government and without an official declaration of war. During the night of 30(17) June 1913, they attacked the Serbian army at Bregalnica river and then the Greek army in Nigrita. The Serbian army resisted the sudden night attack, while most of the soldiers did not even know who they were fighting with, as Bulgarian camps were located next to Serbs and were considered allies. Montenegro's forces were just a few kilometers away and also rushed to the battle. The Bulgarian attack was halted.

The Greek army was also successful. It retreated according to plan for two days while Thessaloniki was cleared of the remaining Bulgarian regiment. Then, the Greek army counterattacked and defeated the Bulgarians at Kilkis (Kukush), after which the mostly Bulgarian town was plundered and burnt and part of its mostly Bulgarian population massacred by the Greek army. Following the capture of Kilkis, the Greek army's pace was not quick enough to prevent the retaliatory destruction of Nigrita, Serres, and Doxato and massacres of non-combatant Greek inhabitants at Sidirokastro and Doxato by the Bulgarian army. The Greek committed further war crimes against the Bulgarian population during it advance - in total about 160 Bulgarian villages were destroyed and most of their population expelled. with multiple additional massacres of the Bulgarian civilian population. The Greek army then divided its forces and advanced in two directions. Part proceeded east and occupied Western Thrace. The rest of the Greek army advanced up to the Struma River valley, defeating the Bulgarian army in the battles of Doiran and Mt. Beles, and continued its advance to the north towards Sofia. In the Kresna straits, the Greeks were ambushed by the Bulgarian 2nd and 1st Armies, newly arrived from the Serbian front, that had already taken defensive positions there following the Bulgarian victory at Kalimanci.

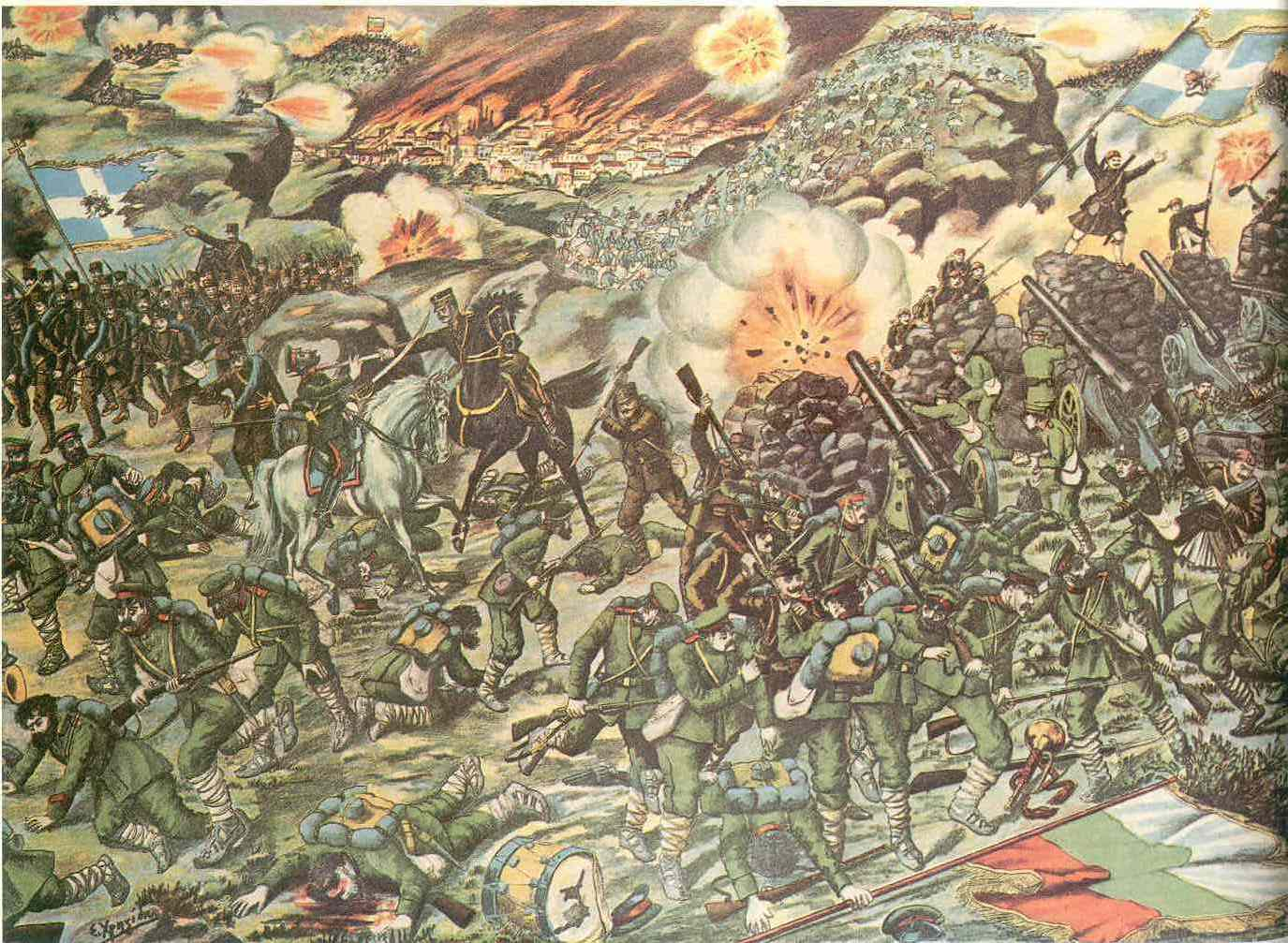
Greek lithograph of the Battle of Kilkis–Lachanas

By 30 July, the Greek army was outnumbered by the counter-attacking Bulgarian army, which attempted to encircle the Greeks in a Cannae-type battle, by applying pressure on their flanks. The Greek army was exhausted and faced logistical difficulties. The battle was continued for 11 days, between 29 July and 9 August over 20 km of a maze of forests and mountains with no conclusion. The Greek king, seeing that the units he fought were from the Serbian front, tried to convince the Serbs to renew their attack, as the front ahead of them was now thinner, but the Serbs declined. By then, news came of the Romanian advance toward Sofia and its imminent fall. Facing the danger of encirclement, Constantine realized that his army could no longer continue hostilities. Thus, he agreed to Venizelos' proposal and accepted the Bulgarian request for an armistice as had been communicated through Romania.

Romania had raised an army and declared war on Bulgaria on 10 July (27 June) as it had from 28 (15) June officially warned Bulgaria that it would not remain neutral in a new Balkan war, due to Bulgaria's refusal to cede the fortress of Silistra as promised before the First Balkan War in exchange for Romanian neutrality. Its forces encountered little resistance and, by the time the Greeks accepted the Bulgarian request for an armistice, they had reached Vrazhdebna, 11 km (7 mi) from the center of Sofia.

Seeing the military position of the Bulgarian army, the Ottomans decided to intervene. They attacked, and, finding no opposition, managed to win back all of their lands which had been officially ceded to Bulgaria as a part of the Sofia Conference in 1914, i.e. Thrace with its fortified city of Adrianople, regaining an area in Europe which was only slightly larger than the present-day European territory of the Republic of Turkey.

== Reactions among the Great Powers during the wars ==
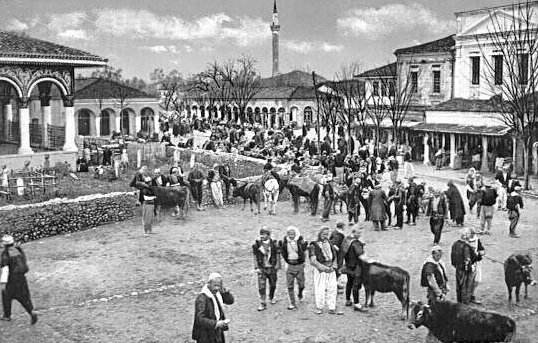
Tirana Bazaar at the turn of the 20th century.

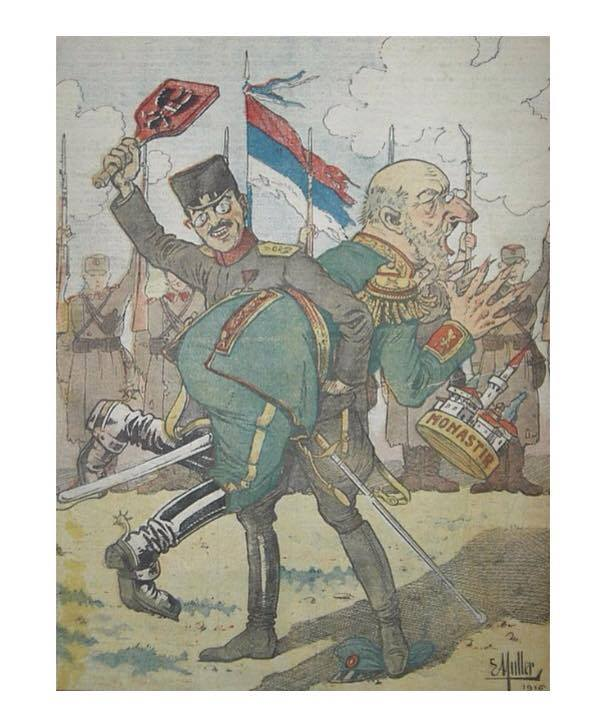
Serbian propaganda poster, depicting King Alexander I beating the losing Bulgarian ruler.

The developments that led to the First Balkan War did not go unnoticed by the Great Powers. Although there was an official consensus between the European Powers over the territorial integrity of the Ottoman Empire, which led to a stern warning to the Balkan states, unofficially each of them took a different diplomatic approach due to their conflicting interests in the area. As a result, any possible preventive effect of the common official warning was cancelled by the mixed unofficial signals, and failed to prevent or to stop the war:

- Russia was a prime mover in the establishment of the Balkan League and saw it as an essential tool in case of a future war against its rival, the Austro-Hungarian Empire. However, it was unaware of the Bulgarian plans over Thrace and Constantinople, territories on which it had long-held ambitions, and on which it had just secured a secret agreement of expansion from its allies France and Britain, as a reward for participating in the upcoming Great War against the Central Powers.
- France, not feeling ready for a war against Germany in 1912, took a totally negative position against the war, firmly informing its ally Russia that it would not take part in a potential conflict between Russia and Austria-Hungary if it resulted from the actions of the Balkan League. The French, however, failed to achieve British participation in a common intervention to stop the Balkan conflict.
- Great Britain, although officially a staunch supporter of the Ottoman Empire's integrity, took secret diplomatic steps encouraging Greek entry into the League in order to counteract Russian influence. At the same time, it encouraged Bulgarian aspirations over Thrace, preferring a Bulgarian Thrace to a Russian one, despite the assurances the British government had given to the Russians in regard to Russia's expansion there.
- Austria-Hungary, struggling for a port on the Adriatic and seeking ways for expansion in the south at the expense of the Ottoman Empire, was totally opposed to any other nation's expansion in the area. At the same time, the Habsburg empire had its own internal problems with significant Slav populations that campaigned against German-Hungarian control of the multinational state. Serbia, whose aspirations in the direction of Austrian-held Bosnia were no secret, was considered an enemy and the main tool of Russian machinations that were behind the agitation of Austria's Slav subjects. But Austria-Hungary failed to secure German backup for a firm reaction. Initially, Emperor Wilhelm II told the Archduke Franz Ferdinand that Germany was ready to support Austria in all circumstances—even at the risk of a world war, but the Austro-Hungarians hesitated. Finally, in the German Imperial War Council of 8 December 1912 the consensus was that Germany would not be ready for war until at least mid-1914 and passed notes to that effect to the Habsburgs. Consequently, no actions could be taken when the Serbs acceded to the Austrian ultimatum of 18 October and withdrew from Albania.
- Germany, already heavily involved in internal Ottoman politics, officially opposed a war against the Empire. But, in her effort to win Bulgaria for the Central Powers, and seeing the inevitability of Ottoman disintegration, was toying with the idea of replacing the Balkan area of the Ottomans with a friendly Greater Bulgaria in her San Stefano borders—an idea that was based on the German origin of the Bulgarian King and his anti-Russian sentiments.

The Second Balkan war was a catastrophic blow to Russian policies in the Balkans, which for centuries had focused on access to the "warm seas". First, it marked the end of the Balkan League, a vital arm of the Russian system of defense against Austria-Hungary. Second, the clearly pro-Serbian position Russia had been forced to take in the conflict, mainly due to the disagreements over land partitioning between Serbia and Bulgaria, caused a permanent break-up between the two countries. Accordingly, Bulgaria reverted its policy to one closer to the Central Powers' understanding over an anti-Serbian front, due to its new national aspirations, now expressed mainly against Serbia. As a result, Serbia was isolated militarily against its rival Austria-Hungary, a development that eventually doomed Serbia in the coming war a year later. Most damaging, the new situation effectively trapped Russian foreign policy: After 1913, Russia could not afford to lose its last ally in this crucial area and thus had no alternatives but to unconditionally support Serbia when the crisis between Serbia and Austria escalated in 1914. This was a position that inevitably drew Russia into an unwelcome World War with devastating results since it was less prepared (both militarily and socially) for that event than any other Great Power.

Austria-Hungary took alarm at the great increase in Serbia's territory at the expense of its national aspirations in the region, as well as Serbia's rising status, especially to Austria-Hungary's Slavic populations. This concern was shared by Germany, which saw Serbia as a satellite of Russia. These concerns contributed significantly to the two Central Powers' willingness to go to war against Serbia. This meant that when a Serbian backed organization assassinated Archduke Franz Ferdinand of Austria, the reform-minded heir to the Austro-Hungarian throne, causing the 1914 July Crisis, the conflict quickly escalated and resulted in the First World War.

== Epilogue ==
=== The Treaty of Bucharest ===
The epilogue to this nine-month pan-Balkan war was drawn mostly by the treaty of Bucharest, 10 August 1913. Delegates of Greece, Serbia, Montenegro, and Bulgaria, hosted by the deputy of Romania arrived in Bucharest to settle negotiations. Ottoman's request to participate was rejected, on the basis that the talks were to deal with matters strictly among the Balkan allies. The Great Powers maintained a very influential presence, but they did not dominate the proceedings.

The Treaty partitioned Macedonia, made changes to the Balkan borders and established the independent state of Albania. Serbia gained the territory of north-east Macedonia, settled the eastern borders with Bulgaria and gained the eastern half of the Sanjak of Novi-Bazar, doubling its size. Montenegro gained the western half of the Sanjak of Novi-Bazar and secured the borders with Serbia. Greece more than doubled its size by gaining southern Epirus, the biggest part of southern Macedonia, including the city-port of Kavala in its eastern border. The Aegean Islands were annexed by the Greek Kingdom, apart from the Dodecanese, and the Cretan unification was completed and formalized. Romania annexed the southern part of Dobruja province. Bulgaria, even though defeated, managed to hold some territorial gains from the First Balkan War. Bulgaria embraced a portion of Macedonia, including the town of Strumnitza, and western Thrace with a 70-mile Aegean coastline including the port-town of Alexandroupolis.

=== Final treaties ===
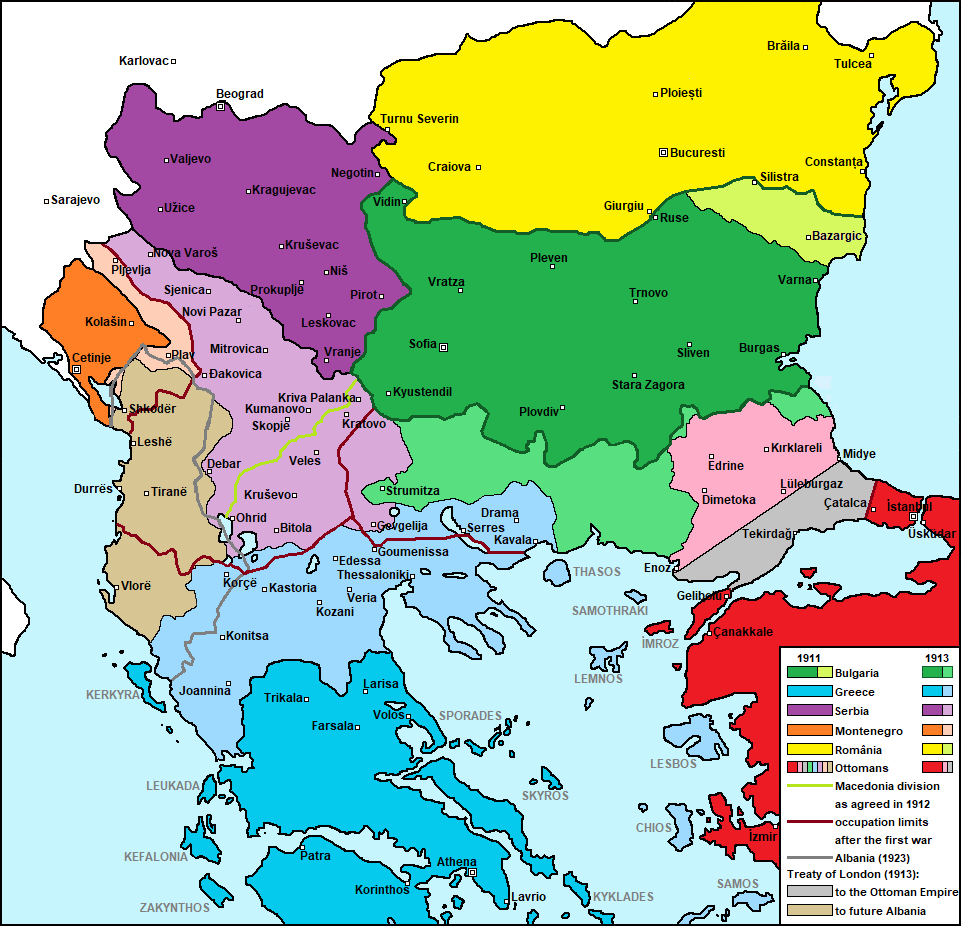
Results of the Balkan Wars

The Bulgarian delegates then met the Ottomans for negotiations in Constantinople. Bulgaria's hope to regain lost territories in Eastern Thrace, where the bulk of Bulgarian forces had struggled to conquer and many died, was dashed as the Turks retained the lands they had regained in the counter-attack. The straight line of Ainos-Midia was not accepted for the eastern Border; the regions of Lozengrad, Lyule Burgas-Buni Hisar, and Adrianople reverted to the Ottomans. After this Treaty of Constantinople, 30 September 1913, Bulgaria sought an alliance with the Ottoman Empire against Greece and Serbia (in support of their claims to Macedonia).

This was followed by the Treaty of Athens, 14 November 1913, between the Turks and Greeks, concluding the conflict between them. However, the status of the Aegean Islands, under Greek control, was left in question, especially the islands of Imvros and Tenedos, strategically positioned near the Dardanelles Straits. Even after signing this treaty, relations between the two countries remained poor, and war almost broke out in spring 1914.

Finally, the second treaty in Constantinople re-established the relations between Serbia and the Ottoman Empire, concluding officially the Balkan Wars. Montenegro never signed a pact with the Turks.

The Balkan Wars brought to an end Ottoman rule of the Balkan Peninsula, except for eastern Thrace and Constantinople (now Istanbul). The Young Turk regime was unable to reverse their Empire's decline, but remained in power, establishing a dictatorship in June 1913.

== All Balkan War conflicts ==
=== First Balkan War conflicts ===
==== Bulgarian-Ottoman battles ====
Battle	Year	Bulgaria Commander	Ottoman Empire Commander	Result
Battle of Kardzhali	1912	Vasil Delov	Mehmed Pasha	Bulgarian Victory
Battle of Kirk Kilisse	1912	Radko Dimitriev	Mahmut Pasha	Bulgarian Victory
Battle of Lule Burgas	1912	Radko Dimitriev	Abdullah Pasha	Bulgarian Victory
Battle of Merhamli	1912	Nikola Genev	Mehmed Pasha	Bulgarian Victory
Naval Battle of Kaliakra	1912	Dimitar Dobrev	Hüseyin Bey	Bulgarian Victory
First Battle of Çatalca	1912	Radko Dimitriev	Nazim Pasha	Ottoman Victory
Battle of Bulair	1913	Georgi Todorov	Mustafa Kemal	Bulgarian Victory
Battle of Şarköy	1913	Stiliyan Kovachev	Enver Pasha	Bulgarian Victory
Second Battle of Çatalca	1913	Vasil Kutinchev	Ahmet Pasha	Indecisive
Siege of Adrianople	1913	Nikola Ivanov	Gazi Pasha	Bulgarian Victory

==== Greek–Ottoman battles ====
Battle	Year	Greece Commander	Ottoman Empire Commander	Result
Battle of Sarantaporo	1912	Constantine I	Hasan Pasha	Greek Victory
Battle of Yenidje	1912	Constantine I	Hasan Pasha	Greek Victory
Battle of Pente Pigadia	1912	Sapountzakis	Esat Pasha	Greek Victory
Battle of Sorovich	1912	Matthaiopoulos	Hasan Pasha	Ottoman Victory
Revolt of Himara	1912	Sapountzakis	Esat Pasha	Greek Victory
Battle of Lesbos	1912	Kountouriotis	Abdul Ghani	Greek Victory
Battle of Chios	1912	Damianos	Zihne Bey	Greek Victory
Battle of Driskos	1912	Matthaiopoulos	Esat Pasha	Ottoman Victory
Battle of Elli	1912	Kountouriotis	Remzi Bey	Greek Victory
Capture of Korytsa	1912	Damianos	Davit Pasha	Greek Victory
Battle of Lemnos	1913	Kountouriotis	Remzi Bey	Greek Victory
Battle of Bizani	1913	Constantine I	Esat Pasha	Greek Victory

==== Serbian–Ottoman battles ====
Battle	Year	Serbia Commander	Ottoman Empire Commander	Result
Battle of Kumanovo	1912	Radomir Putnik	Zeki Pasha	Serbian Victory
Battle of Prilep	1912	Petar Bojović	Zeki Pasha	Serbian Victory
Battle of Monastir	1912	Petar Bojović	Zeki Pasha	Serbian Victory
Battle of Lumë	1912	Božidar Jankovic	Bajram Curri	Serbian Victory
Siege of Scutari	1913	Nikola I	Hasan Pasha	Montenegrin–Serbian victory
Siege of Adrianople	1913	Stepa Stepanovic	Gazi Pasha	Serbian Victory

=== Second Balkan War conflicts ===
==== Bulgarian–Greek battles ====
Battle	Date	Bulgaria Commander	Greece Commander	Result
Battle of Kilkis-Lahanas	2–4 July 1913 (19–21 June O.S.)	Nikola Ivanov	Constantine I	Greek Victory
Battle of Doiran	6 July 1913 (23 June O.S.)	Nikola Ivanov	Constantine I	Greek Victory
Battle of Demir Hisar	9–10 July 1913 (26–27 June O.S.)	Nikola Ivanov	Constantine I	Greek Victory
Battle of Hill 1378	25–28 July 1913 (12–15 July O.S.)	Vasil Delov	Dionysios Papadopoulos	Greek Victory
Battle of Kresna Gorge	27–31 July 1913 (14–18 July O.S.)	Mihail Savov	Constantine I	Inconclusive

==== Bulgarian–Serbian battles ====
Battle	Date	Bulgaria Commander	Serbia Commander	Result
Battle of Bregalnica	30 June–9 July 1913 (17–26 June O.S.)	Stiliyan Kovachev	Radomir Putnik	Serbian victory
Battle of Knjaževac	4–7 July 1913 (21–24 June O.S.)	Vasil Kutinchev	Vukoman Aračić	Bulgarian victory
Battle of Pirot	6–8 July 1913 (23–25 June O.S.)	Racho Petrov	Božidar Janković	Serbian victory
Battle of Belogradchik	8 July 1913 (25 June O.S.)	Radko Dimitriev	Božidar Janković	Serbian victory
Siege of Vidin	12–18 July 1913 (29 June–5 July O.S.)	Krastyu Marinov	Vukoman Aračić	Bulgarian Victory
Battle of Kalimanci	18–19 July 1913 (5–6 July O.S.)	Mihail Savov	Božidar Janković	Bulgarian victory

==== Bulgarian–Ottoman battles ====
Battle	Year	Bulgaria Commander	Ottoman Empire Commander	Result
Siege of Adrianople	1913	Mihail Savov	Enver Pasha	First Armistice
Ottoman Advance of Thrace	1913	Vulko Velchev	Ahmed Pasha	Final Armistice

==== Bulgarian–Romanian battles ====
Battle	Year	Bulgaria Commander	Romania Commander	Result
Romanian landings in Bulgaria	1913	Ferdinand I	Carol I of Romania	First Armistice
Southern Dobruja Offensive	1913	Ferdinand I	Carol I of Romania	Final Armistice

== Legacy ==
Citizens of Turkey regard the Balkan Wars as a major disaster (Balkan harbi faciası) in the nation's history. The Ottoman Empire lost all its European territories west of the River Maritsa as a result of the two Balkan Wars, which thus delineated present-day Turkey's western border. By 1923, only 38% of the Muslim population of 1912 still lived in the Balkans and majority of Balkan Turks had been killed or expelled. The unexpected fall and sudden relinquishing of Turkish-dominated European territories created a traumatic event amongst many Turks that triggered the ultimate collapse of the empire itself within five years. Paul Mojzes has called the Balkan Wars an ''unrecognized genocide''.

Nazım Pasha, Chief of Staff of the Ottoman Army, was held responsible for the failure and was assassinated on 23 January 1913 during the 1913 Ottoman coup d'état.

Most Greeks regard the Balkan Wars as a period of epic achievements. They managed to liberate and gain territories that had been inhabited by Greeks since ancient times and doubled the size of the Greek Kingdom, capturing major cities such as Thessaloniki and Ioannina that had been under Ottoman rule for almost half a millennium. The Greek Army, small and ill-equipped compared to the superior Ottoman but also Bulgarian and Serbian armies, won very important battles. That made Greece a viable pawn in the Great Powers' chess play. Two great personalities rose in the Greek political arena, Prime Minister Eleftherios Venizelos, the leading mind behind the Greek foreign policy, and Crown Prince, and later King, Konstantinos I, the Major General of the Greek Army.

== See also ==
- History of the Balkans
- International relations (1814–1919)
- Ottoman wars in Europe
- Serbo-Bulgarian War (1885)
- Albanian Revolt of 1910
- Albanian Revolt of 1911
- Albanian Revolt of 1912
- Destruction of the Thracian Bulgarians in 1913
- Balkans Campaign (World War I)
- Balkans Campaign (World War II)
- List of places burned during the Balkan Wars
