= Constitution of the Cretan State =

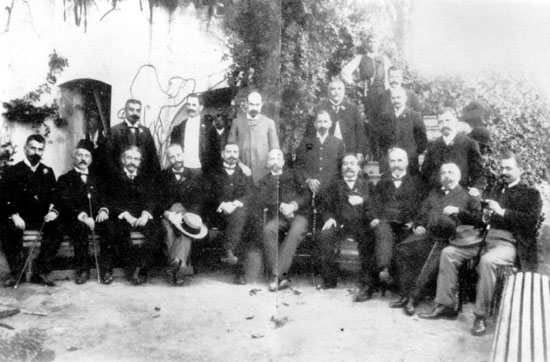
The members of the Constitution's drafting committee

The Constitution of the Cretan State (Greek: Σύνταγμα της Κρητικής Πολιτείας) was the constitution of the Cretan State, an autonomous state under Ottoman suzerainty and guaranteed by the Great Powers, encompassing the island of Crete (now in Greece). It came into effect on 8 February 1907. It remained in force until 1908, when the Cretans unilaterally proclaimed the island's union with Greece during the Bosnian Crisis [1]. Although this act was not internationally recognized, Crete was governed thereafter according to the laws of the Kingdom of Greece, until it was formally united with Greece in December 1913, following the Balkan Wars.
