= List of places burned during the Balkan Wars =

List of places burned during the Balkan Wars (1912-1913) is a list of places totally or partly burned during the Balkan Wars (1912-1913).

== Table ==
List of places burned during the Balkan Wars (1912-1913)
Name	Date	Pre-war population	Deaths	Notes
Kilkis	July 4, 1913	13,000	74	Totally ruined.
Serres	July 11, 1913	30,000	200	4,000 of the 6,000 houses destroyed.
Doxato	July 13, 1913		500	Only 30 of the 270 Greek houses were left intact.
Giannitsa	1912			Turkish part of the town was burned down.
Nigrita				
Strumica	August 21–23, 1913			Turkish and Greek part of the town burned.
Havsa	1912		10	Turkish quarter almost entirely burnt.
Yenimuhacir	July 7, 1913	2,132	450	all 420 houses burned of the Bulgarian village Bulgarköy near Keşan.
Osmanlı	1913			all 114 houses destroyed of the Bulgarian village Osmanlı near Havsa.
Hasköy	1912			Only 25 of 55 houses of the Turkish part of the village survived.

Approximate locations

== Bibliography ==
- International Commission to Inquire into the Causes and Conduct of the Balkan Wars (1914). Report of the International Commission to Inquire Into the Causes and Conduct of the Balkan Wars. Carnegie Endowment for International Peace.
