= Margaritis Kastellis =

Greek composer and army officer

Margaritis Kastellis (Castellis) (Greek: Μαργαρίτης Καστέλλης) (1907–1972 ) was a Greek composer and army officer known for his work in military music. His arrangement and adaptation of the Hymn to Liberty for military band is still played Greece today. He was born in Chrysoupoli (a city in northern Greece), then part of the Salonica vilayet of the Ottoman Empire, and died in Athens.

== Life and career ==
Kastellis studied under Manolis Kalomiris. He joined the Greek Army at an early age, as a musician, and upon completion of a full career, he left with the rank of Lieutenant-Colonel, having served as Chief Inspector of Military Bands nationwide. After retiring in 1963, he taught for several years at the National Conservatoire. He was an authority on wind instruments (both woodwind and brass, including brass band instruments).

== Style ==
The main features of his music are:

- A profound attachment to popular musical tradition.
- A marked preference for "freer" form of composition (suite, fantasy) over more "formal" ones (sonata, symphony, concerto), though he was by no means unfamiliar with the latter.

A large part of his scores are to be found at the Thessaloniki University Library (Department of Musical Studies), along with a 2002 thesis Christina Anastassiou.

== Selected works ==
=== Compositions ===
For orchestra

- Introduction and Round Dance from Epirus
- Prelude and Dance from Epirus
- Greek Dances (on motives taken from Greek Island tunes)

For military band

- Introduction and Round Dance from Epirus
- On the Mountain Slopes of Zagori
- The Booted Eagle
- Thessaly (march)

Chamber music

- Little Suite for clarinet and bassoon
- Elegy for two clarinets

Piano music

- Greek Dances
- Little Greek Suite (4 hands)

Songs

- Listen to my Secret
- The Hazelnut Tree
- The Sailor
- The Shepherdess' Lover
- The Heart of a Woman (for 4 voices)

=== Arrangements and transcriptions ===
For Orchestra

- Little Lemon Tree
- The Zalongo Dance
- Vassiliki (Gives the Orders)
- Farewell, ye Fair Maids
- Lyngos

For Military Band

- Hymn to Liberty
- Florilège (Songs by Attique)
- Prayer (Bortniansky)
- Reveille (for the Infantry)
- Reveille (for the Artillery)
