= Treaty of Constantinople (1897) =

1897 treaty between the Ottoman Empire and Greece

- Type: Bilateral treaty
- Signed: 4 December 1897
- Location: Constantinople, Ottoman Empire
- Original signatories: Ottoman Empire; Kingdom of Greece
- Ratifiers: Ottoman Empire; Kingdom of Greece

The Treaty of Constantinople was a treaty between the Ottoman Empire and the Kingdom of Greece signed on 4 December 1897 following the Greco-Turkish War (1897).

== Background ==
The island of Crete was a part of the Ottoman Empire, but had a predominantly Christian, Greek-speaking population, which had rebelled several times to achieve union with Greece. During one such revolt, on 2 February 1897 Greek troops landed in Crete to annex the island. This led to the outbreak of the so-called 30 Days' War between the Ottoman Empire and Greece. It was fought mainly in Thessaly and Epirus. In Thessaly, the superior Ottoman army commanded by Edhem Pasha defeated the Greeks and captured a large amount of territory, and at the end there was no major Greek force to prevent the Ottomans from capturing Athens. Greece asked for peace and the Great Powers of Europe intervened to force the Ottoman government to return the majority of the lands occupied during the war, and to grant autonomy for Crete.

== The treaty ==
Peace talks began on 21 October 1897 and the treaty was signed on 4 December 1897. The terms were:

1. Thessaly, which had been occupied by Ottoman forces, was to be largely returned to Greece with small changes in the pre-war border line in favour of the Ottomans.
2. Greece agreed to pay heavy reparations.
3. The Ottomans would not withdraw before the reparations were paid.
4. The Ottomans agreed to promote the status of Crete as an autonomous state under Ottoman suzerainty.

== Aftermath ==
Although the Ottoman army was victorious in the field, the Ottoman Empire did not benefit from the victory. The suzerainty over Crete proved to be completely ineffective and Crete unilaterally declared union with Greece in 1908. This was formalized after the Balkan Wars, with the island joining Greece on 1 December 1913. In the 1923 population exchange between Greece and Turkey, the Muslim population of the island was transferred to Turkey.
