= Albanian Revolt =

The Albanian Revolts may refer to:

- The Albanian revolt of 1432–1436
- The Albanian revolts of 1833–1839
- The Uprising of Dervish Cara
- The Albanian revolt of 1845
- The Albanian revolt of 1847
- The Albanian revolt of 1910
- The Malissori uprising
- The Albanian revolt of 1912
- The 1914–1915 Muslim revolts in Albania
- The Fall of communism in Albania
- The 1997 Albanian civil unrest
