= Battle of Pirot (1913) =

1913 battle during the Second Balkan War

- Part of the Second Balkan War
Date	6–8 July 1913
Location	Near Pirot, Serbia
Result	Serbian victory

Belligerents
Kingdom of Bulgaria	Kingdom of Serbia

Commanders and leaders
(Tsardom of Bulgaria (1908–1946)) Racho Petrov	(Kingdom of Serbia) Stepa Stepanović

Units involved
3rd Army	2nd Army

The Battle of Pirot were engagements between the Bulgarian and Serbian armies in the surroundings of Pirot near the Serbian–Bulgarian border between 6 and 8 July 1913.

On the front between the Bulgarian 3rd Army (Slivnica-Trn-Caribrod) and Serbian 2nd Army (Sofia-Pirot-Niš), the main fighting took place outside Pirot on 6 and 7 July. A commander of the Serbian 2nd Army, general Stepa Stepanović suggested on 8 July that Pirot was to be evacuated. However, when the Romanian advance threatened the Bulgarian 1st Army on the evening the same day, the Bulgarian command ordered for withdrawal. Due to the Serbian victory at Bregalnica, the Bulgarians were forced to give up aspirations in southeastern Serbia.
