= Clan Lyon =

Scottish clan

- Crest: Within a garland of bay leaves, a lady from the middle richly attired, holding in her dexter hand a thistle all Proper (in allusion to the alliance of Sir John Lyon with Princess Jean, daughter of King Robert II).
- Motto: In Te Domine Speravi (In thee o Lord have I put my trust)

Profile
- Region: Lowlands

Chief
- Rt Hon Simon Patrick Bowes-Lyon
- 19th Earl of Strathmore and Kinghorne
- Seat: Glamis Castle
Septs of Clan Lyon
Lion(s), Lyon, Lyons, Lehane, Lehan
Clan branches
Lyon of Strathmore and Kinghorne (chiefs)
Bowes-Lyon
Rival clans
Clan Lindsay

Clan Lyon is a Scottish clan.

== History ==
=== Origins of the clan ===
The usually reliable genealogist Sir Iain Moncreiffe stated that the Lyons were a family of Celtic, not Norman, origin and that they were descended from a younger son of the Clan Lamont. However, it dubiously alternatively has been asserted that Clan Lyon descend from a French family called de Léon. In 1105, a Roger de Leonne witnessed a charter from Edgar to Dunfermline Abbey.

=== 14th, 15th and 16th centuries ===
Robert II of Scotland granted to Sir John Lyon, who was known as the White Lyon due to his complexion, the thanage of Glamis and five years later he was made Chamberlain of Scotland. Sir John Lyon married king Robert's daughter, Princess Jean Stewart which brought him the lands of Tannadice on the River Esk. Lyon was also granted the barony of Kinghorn, however he was later killed in a quarrel with Sir James Lindsay of Crawford.

Sir John Lyon's son, another John Lyon further strengthened the royal ties by marrying a granddaughter of Robert II. John's son, Patrick Lyon was created Lord Glamis in 1445. He became Master of the Household of Scotland and a Privy Councillor. He had previously been sent to England as a hostage in 1424 for the ransom of James I of Scotland.

John Lyon, 6th Lord Glamis was a quarrelsome man with a quick temper. He married Janet Douglas, Lady Glamis, granddaughter of Archibald Douglas, 5th Earl of Angus who was known as Bell the Cat, and after Douglas died she suffered terribly for the hatred that James V of Scotland had towards all of the name of Douglas. Lady Glamis was accused of witchcraft and despite speaking boldly in her own defense, she was burnt at the stake on castle hill in Edinburgh on 3 December 1540. Her young son was also sentenced to death when he came of age, however the king died before he had grown up and so he avoided the death sentence and was released. The king had taken possession of Glamis Castle and plundered it.

John Lyon, 8th Lord Glamis renounced his allegiance to Mary, Queen of Scots and served under the Regents Moray and Lennox. The 8th Lord was made Lord Chancellor of Scotland and also Keeper of the Great Seal of Scotland. The 9th Lord Glamis was captain of the Royal Guard and a Privy Councillor to James VI of Scotland. He was created Earl of Kinghorne, Viscount Lyon and Baron Glamis in 1606.

=== 17th century and Civil War ===
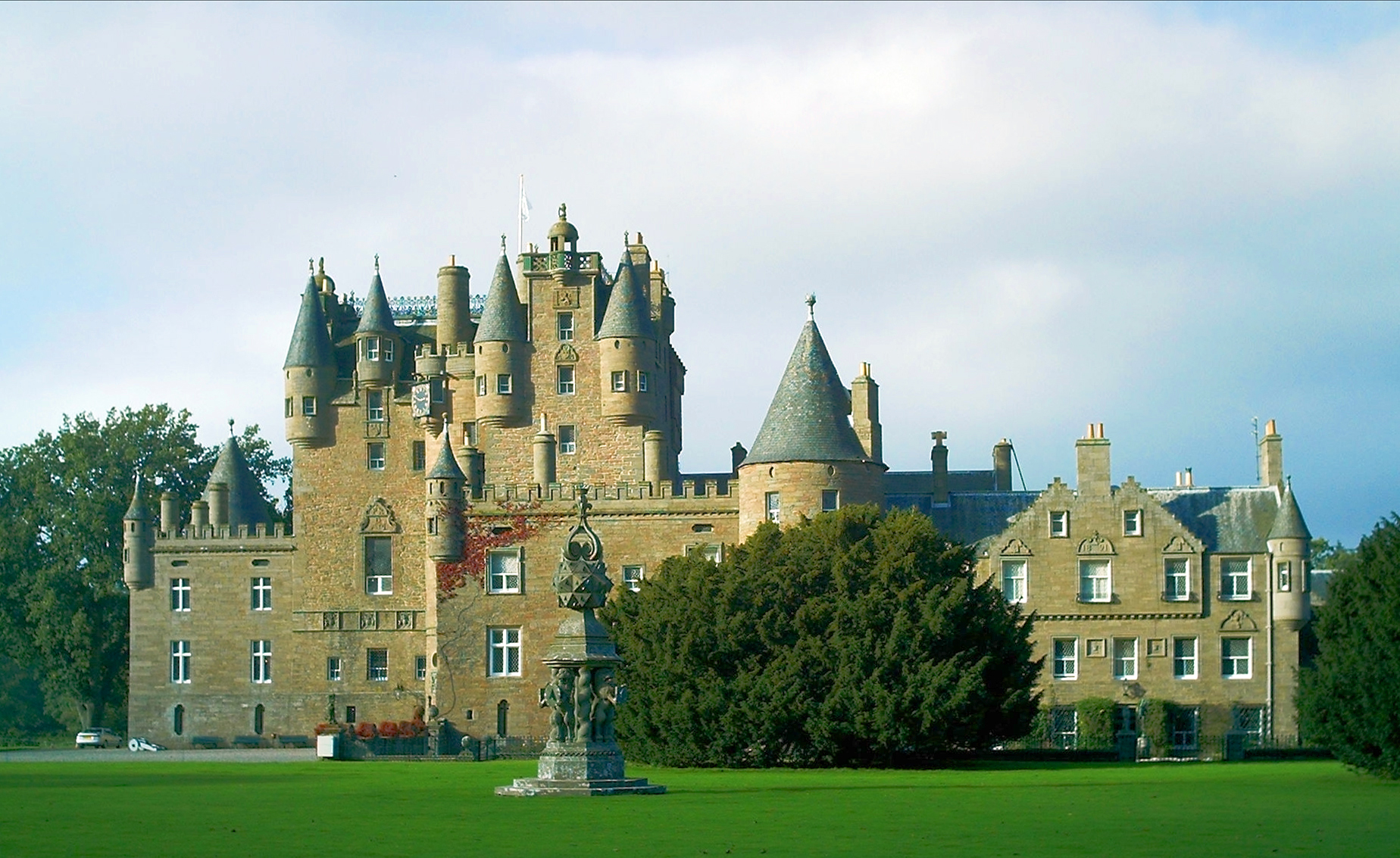
Glamis Castle, seat of clan Lyon

John Lyon, 2nd Earl of Kinghorne was a close personal friend of James Graham, 1st Marquis of Montrose. Lyon was with Montrose in 1638 when he subscribed to the National Covenant. Lyon accompanied Montrose on his early campaigns in defense of the Covenant, however he did not support him when he chose to fight for Charles I of England. As a result, Lyon's estates were almost ruined for supporting the Army of the Covenant.

Patrick Lyon, 3rd Earl of Strathmore and Kinghorne paid off the debts that he had inherited from his father and was later able to enlarge Glamis Castle.

=== 18th century and Jacobite risings ===
The 3rd Earl's son, John Lyon, 4th Earl of Strathmore and Kinghorne was a member of the Privy Council but opposed the 1707 Treaty of Union. During the Jacobite rising of 1715, his son was a Jacobite who fought at the Battle of Sheriffmuir and died defending his regiment's colours. James Francis Edward Stuart (the Old Pretender) stayed at Glamis in 1716 and amongst the relics of the castle today are a sword and watch that belonged to him.

During the Jacobite rising of 1745 the Duke of Cumberland stayed at Glamis on his march to the Battle of Culloden, but it is said that he was much less welcome.

== Lineage ==
- Sir John Lyon (c. 1340–1382)
  - Sir John Lyon (c. 1377–c. 1435)
    - Patrick Lyon, 1st Lord Glamis (1402–1459)
      - Alexander Lyon, 2nd Lord Glamis (c. 1430–1486)
      - John Lyon, 3rd Lord Glamis (1431–1497)
        - John Lyon, 4th Lord Glamis (died 1500)
          - George Lyon, 5th Lord Glamis (died 1505)
          - John Lyon, 6th Lord Glamis (died 1528)
            - John Lyon, 7th Lord Glamis (c. 1510–1558)
              - John Lyon, 8th Lord Glamis (died 1578)
                - Patrick Lyon, 1st Earl of Kinghorne (c. 1575–1615)
                  - John Lyon, 2nd Earl of Kinghorne (1596–1646)
                    - Patrick Lyon, 3rd Earl of Strathmore and Kinghorne (1643–1695)
                      - John Lyon, 4th Earl of Strathmore and Kinghorne (1663–1712)
                        - John Lyon, 5th Earl of Strathmore and Kinghorne (1696–1715)
                        - Charles Lyon, 6th Earl of Strathmore and Kinghorne (1699–1728)
                        - James Lyon, 7th Earl of Strathmore and Kinghorne (1702–1735)
                        - Thomas Lyon, 8th Earl of Strathmore and Kinghorne (1704–1753)
                          - John Lyon, 9th Earl of Strathmore and Kinghorne (1737–1776)
                            - John Bowes, 10th Earl of Strathmore and Kinghorne (1769–1820)
                              - John Bowes (1811–1885)
                            - Thomas Lyon-Bowes, 11th Earl of Strathmore and Kinghorne (1773–1846)
                              - Thomas George Lyon-Bowes, Lord Glamis (1801–1834)
                                - Thomas Lyon-Bowes, Master of Glamis (1821)
                                - Thomas Lyon-Bowes, 12th Earl of Strathmore and Kinghorne (1822–1865)
                                - Claude Bowes-Lyon, 13th Earl of Strathmore and Kinghorne (1824–1904)
                                  - Claude Bowes-Lyon, 14th Earl of Strathmore and Kinghorne (1855–1944)
                                    - Mary Bowes-Lyon (1883–1961)
                                    - Patrick Bowes-Lyon, 15th Earl of Strathmore and Kinghorne (1884–1949)
                                      - Timothy Bowes-Lyon, 16th Earl of Strathmore and Kinghorne (1918–1972)
                                    - John Bowes-Lyon (1886–1930)
                                      - Anne Bowes-Lyon (1917–1980)
                                      - Nerissa Bowes-Lyon (1919–1986)
                                      - Katherine Bowes-Lyon (1926–2014)
                                    - Fergus Bowes-Lyon (1889–1915)
                                    - Rose Bowes-Lyon (1890–1967)
                                    - Michael Bowes-Lyon (1893–1953)
                                      - Fergus Bowes-Lyon, 17th Earl of Strathmore and Kinghorne (1928–1987)
                                        - Michael Bowes-Lyon, 18th Earl of Strathmore and Kinghorne (1957–2016)
                                          - Simon Bowes-Lyon, 19th Earl of Strathmore and Kinghorne (born 1986)
                                      - Mary Bowes-Lyon (1932–2021)
                                      - Albemarle Bowes-Lyon (1940–2023)
                                    - Elizabeth Bowes-Lyon (1900–2002)
                                    - David Bowes-Lyon (1902–1961)
                                      - Simon Bowes-Lyon (born 1932)
                                  - Francis Bowes-Lyon (1856–1948)
                                    - Lilian Bowes Lyon (1895–1949)
                                  - Ernest Bowes-Lyon (1858–1891)
                                    - Ernestine Bowes-Lyon (1891–1981)
                                  - Herbert Bowes-Lyon (1860–1897)
                                  - Patrick Bowes-Lyon (1863–1946)
                          - Thomas Lyon (1741–1796)
                      - Patrick Lyon (1669–1715)
                - Jean Lyon (died c. 1610)
              - Thomas Lyon (died 1608)
              - Margaret Lyon (died 1625)

== Clan chiefs ==
Current Chief (assumed) - Simon Patrick Bowes-Lyon, 19th Earl of Strathmore and Kinghorne

- 1987–2016 – Rt Hon Michael Fergus Bowes-Lyon, DL, 18th Earl of Strathmore and Kinghorne
- 1972–1987 – Fergus Bowes-Lyon, 17th Earl of Strathmore and Kinghorne
- 1949–1972 – Timothy Bowes-Lyon, 16th Earl of Strathmore and Kinghorne
- 1944–1949 – Rt Hon Patrick Bowes-Lyon, 15th Earl of Strathmore and Kinghorne
- 1904–1944 – Rt Hon Claude George Bowes-Lyon, KG, KT, GCVO, TD, 14th Earl of Strathmore and Kinghorne
- 1865–1904 – Claude Bowes-Lyon, 13th Earl of Strathmore and Kinghorne
- 1846–1865 – Thomas Lyon-Bowes, 12th Earl of Strathmore and Kinghorne
- 1820–1846 – Thomas Lyon-Bowes, 11th Earl of Strathmore and Kinghorne
- 1776–1820 – John Lyon-Bowes, 10th Earl of Strathmore and Kinghorne
- 1753–1776 – John Bowes, 9th Earl of Strathmore and Kinghorne
- 1735–1753 – Thomas Lyon, 8th Earl of Strathmore and Kinghorne
- 1728–1735 – James Lyon, 7th Earl of Strathmore and Kinghorne
- 1695–1712 – Charles Lyon, 6th Earl of Strathmore and Kinghorne
- 1712–1715 – John Lyon, 5th Earl of Strathmore and Kinghorne
- 1695–1712 – John Lyon, 4th Earl of Strathmore and Kinghorne
- 1646–1695 – Patrick Lyon, 3rd Earl of Strathmore and Kinghorne
- 1615–1646 – John Lyon, 2nd Earl of Strathmore and Kinghorne
- 1606–1615 – Patrick Lyon, 1st Earl of Strathmore and Kinghorne

== Clan castle ==
The seat of the chief of Clan Lyon is at Glamis Castle in Angus, Scotland.

== Clan arms ==
Quarterly, 1st & 4th, argent, a lion rampant azure, armed and langued gules, within a double tressure flory counterflory of the Second (Lyon); 2nd & 3rd, ermine, three bows stringed paleways Proper (Bowes); en surtout an inescutcheon azure, thereon a rose argent, barbed vert and seeded or, ensigned with the Imperial Crown Proper, within a double tressure flory counterflory of the Second, the said inescutcheon ensigned with an Earl’s coronet Proper (the said honourable augmentation being limited to the Earl of Strathmore and Kinghorne and to the heirs succeeding him in his said Earldom).
