= Countess of Strathmore =

Countess of Strathmore is a title given to the wife of the Earl of Strathmore. Women who have held this title include:

- Elizabeth Lyon, Countess of Strathmore and Kinghorne (1663 to 1723)
- Susan Lyon, Countess of Strathmore and Kinghorne (c. 1709–1754)
- Mary Bowes, Countess of Strathmore and Kinghorne (1749–1800)
- Frances Bowes-Lyon, Countess of Strathmore and Kinghorne (1832–1922)
- Cecilia Bowes-Lyon, Countess of Strathmore and Kinghorne (1862–1938)
- Mary Bowes-Lyon, Countess of Strathmore and Kinghorne (1932–2025)
