= Thomas Lyon, 8th Earl of Strathmore and Kinghorne =

Scottish nobleman and Tory politician

The Right Honourable The Earl of Strathmore and Kinghorne
- Born: 1704; Glamis Castle
- Died: 18 January 1753 (aged 48–49); Glamis Castle
- Title: 8th Earl of Strathmore and Kinghorne
- Spouse: Joan Nicholson (m. 1736)
- Children: 7 (including John Bowes, 9th Earl of Strathmore and Kinghorne and Thomas Lyon)
- Parents: John Lyon, 4th Earl of Strathmore and Kinghorne; Lady Elizabeth Stanhope

Thomas Lyon, 8th Earl of Strathmore (1704 – 18 January 1753) was a Scottish nobleman, and Tory politician who sat in the House of Commons from 1734 to 1735, when he resigned upon succeeding to the peerage as Earl of Strathmore.

Lyon was baptized on 6 July 1704, the seventh son of John Lyon, 4th Earl of Strathmore and Kinghorne, and his wife Lady Elizabeth Stanhope daughter of Philip Stanhope, 2nd Earl of Chesterfield.

Lyon was returned as Tory member of parliament (MP) for Forfarshire on the Strathmore interest at the 1734 British general election. He vacated his seat when he succeeded his brother to the peerage on 4 January 1735.

On 20 July 1736, Strathmore married Joan (or Jean) Nicholson, daughter of James Nicholson of West Rainton, county Durham at Houghton-le-Spring. He died on 18 January 1753, leaving three sons and four daughters:

- John Lyon, who changed his name and became John Bowes, 9th Earl of Strathmore and Kinghorne (1737–1776)
- James Philip Lyon (1738–1763)
- Thomas Lyon (1741–1796). MP for Aberdeen Burghs. Married Mary Wren. Their daughter Charlotte Lyon (died 1871) married Revd Henry George Liddell (died 1872) (son of Sir Henry Liddell 5th Bart). The children of Charlotte Lyon and Revd Henry George Liddell were the Very Revd Henry George Liddell (d. 1898) and Charles Liddell (d. 1894)
- Mary Lyon (died 1767)
- Susan Lyon (died 26 February 1769)
- Anne Lyon (22 April 1746 – 1811). In 1768 she married John Simpson (1740–1802), of Bradley Hall, Durham, son of John Simpson, of Bradley Hall. Their daughter Maria Susannah Simpson (1773–1845) married Thomas Liddell, 1st Baron Ravensworth (youngest son of Sir Henry Liddell 5th Bart, younger brother of Revd Henry George Liddell died 1872). Their youngest daughter, Frances Eleanor Simpson (1775 or 1776 – 15 April 1833) married in 1799 Sir John Dean Paul, 1st Bart. of Rodborough, Co. of Gloucester, (1775–1852) and had three sons and four daughters.
- Jane Lyon (died 1836)

== Ancestry ==
Ancestors of Thomas Lyon, 8th Earl of Strathmore and Kinghorne

16. Patrick Lyon, 1st Earl of Kinghorne
8. John Lyon, 2nd Earl of Kinghorne
17. Anne Lyon, Countess of Kinghorne
4. Patrick Lyon, 3rd Earl of Strathmore and Kinghorne
18. Patrick Maule, 1st Earl of Panmure
9. Lady Elizabeth Maule
19. Frances Stanhope
2. John Lyon, 4th Earl of Strathmore and Kinghorne
20. Robert Middleton
10. John Middleton, 1st Earl of Middleton
21. Elizabeth Strachan
5. Lady Helen Middleton
22. James Durham
11. Grizel Durham
23. Janet Wishart
1. Thomas Lyon, 8th Earl of Strathmore and Kinghorne
24. Philip Stanhope, 1st Earl of Chesterfield
12. Henry Stanhope, Lord Stanhope
25. Catherine Hastings
6. Philip Stanhope, 2nd Earl of Chesterfield
26. Thomas Wotton, 2nd Baron Wotton
13. Katherine Wotton
27. Mary Throckmorton
3. Lady Elizabeth Stanhope
28. Thomas Butler, Viscount Thurles
14. James Butler, 1st Duke of Ormonde
29. Elizabeth Poyntz
7. Lady Elizabeth Butler
30. Richard Preston, 1st Earl of Desmond
15. Lady Elizabeth Preston, 2nd Lady Dingwall
31. Lady Elizabeth Butler

Parliament of Great Britain
Preceded by Robert Scott	Member of Parliament for Forfarshire; 1734–1735	Succeeded by William Maule
Peerage of Scotland
Preceded by James Lyon	Earl of Strathmore and Kinghorne; 1735–1753	Succeeded by John Bowes
Masonic offices
Preceded by The Earl of Morton	Grand Master of the Grand Lodge of Scotland; 1740–1741	Succeeded by The Earl of Leven
