= Charles Lyon, 6th Earl of Strathmore and Kinghorne =

Scottish peer and nobleman

The Right Honourable The Earl of Strathmore and Kinghorne
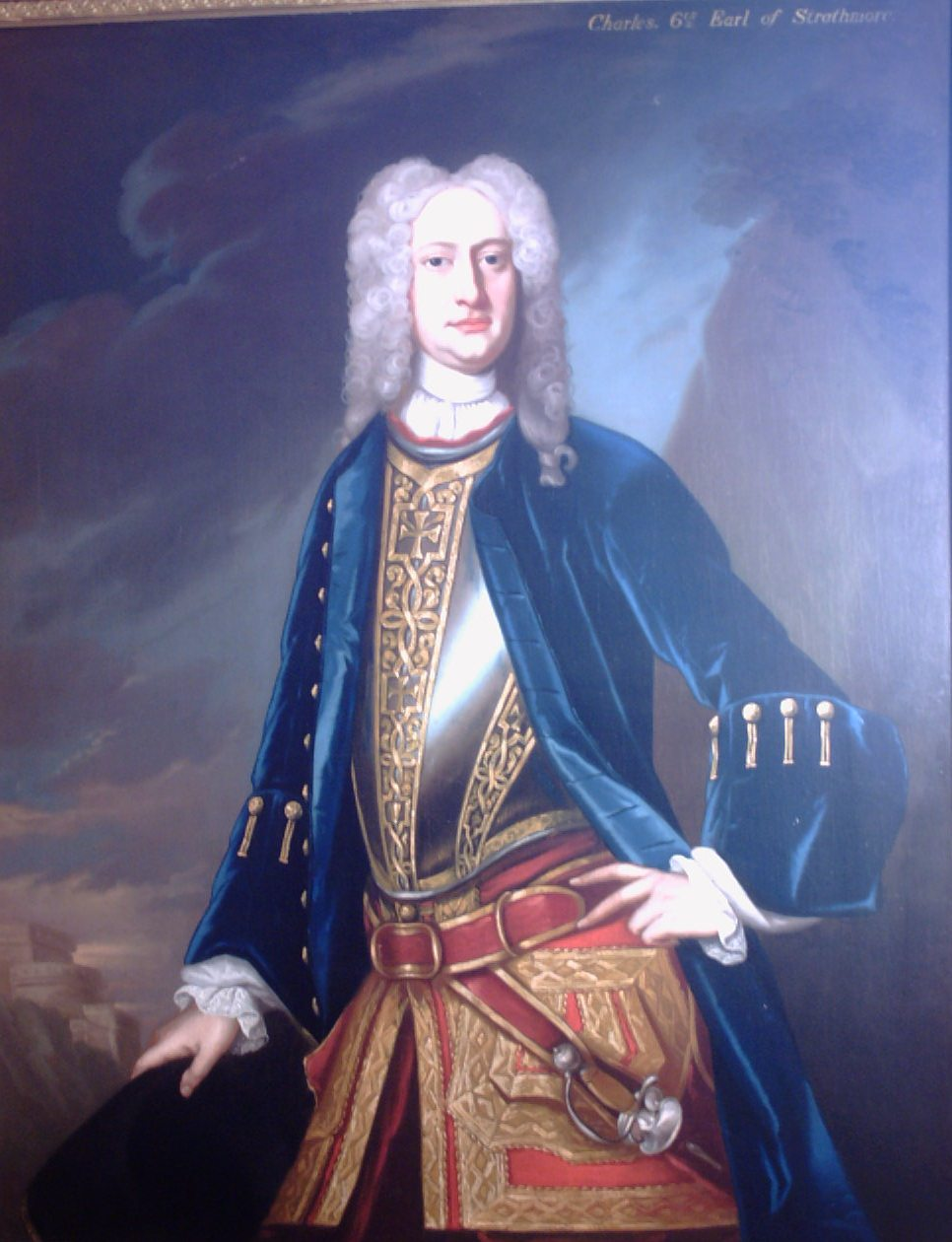
- The 6th Earl of Strathmore and Kinghorne
- Born: c. 1699
- Died: 11 May 1728; Glamis Castle
- Cause of death: Culpable Homicide (Accidental Killing)
- Title: 6th Earl of Strathmore and Kinghorne
- Spouse: Lady Susanna Cochrane
- Parent(s): John Lyon, 4th Earl of Strathmore and Kinghorne; Lady Elizabeth Stanhope

Charles Lyon, 6th Earl of Strathmore and Kinghorne (c. 1699 – 11 May 1728) was a Scottish peer and nobleman. He was the son of John Lyon, 4th Earl of Strathmore and Kinghorne. His exact date of birth is unknown but he was baptised on 12 July 1699.

Although his brother John Lyon, 5th Earl of Strathmore and Kinghorne and his uncle Patrick Lyon of Auchterhouse were to display the family's royalist sympathies when they joined the Jacobite cause, and were both slain at the battle of Sheriffmuir in 1715, Charles, the 6th Earl was not directly implicated in the rebellion and although both his family seats were visited by the Old Pretender (James). On 25 July 1725 he married Susanna Cochrane (died 23 June 1754), daughter of John Cochrane, 4th Earl of Dundonald. Earl Charles was accidentally killed in an incident at Forfar by James Carnegie of Finhaven in May 1728 and left no heir.

== The death of the Earl ==
On 9 May 1728, Patrick Carnegie of Lour, residing in the burgh of Forfar, was burying his daughter. Before the funeral, he entertained the Earl of Strathmore, his brother James Carnegie of Finhaven, John Lyon of Bridgeton, and some others at dinner in his house. After the funeral, the men left to continue drinking at a tavern owned by Clerk Dickinson off Castle Street. Carnegie of Finhaven became very drunk. Lyon of Bridgeton was reportedly less intoxicated, but the drink made him "rude and unmannerly" towards Finhaven.

Afterwards, the Earl of Strathmore went to call at the house of Finhaven's sister, Lady Auchterhouse, who was also the wife of the late Patrick Lyon of Auctherhouse, the uncle of the 6th Earl. The others followed. Even in the presence of a lady, Bridgeton continued his "boisterous rudeness" towards Finhaven and allegedly pinched Auchterhouse's arm.

About dusk, the party left the residence. When they were on the street, Bridgeton pushed Finhaven into a "deep and dirty kennel" (ditch), which covered him with "mire". Helped out of the kennel by the valet of the Earl, Finhaven, incensed by Bridgeton's action, rose, drew his sword, and stumbled up toward Bridgeton, who was trying to draw the Earl's sword from him, as he had none. The Earl, seeing him advance, pushed Bridgeton aside, and was inadvertently struck by Finhaven's thrust. The sword punctured his abdomen about three inches above the naval and exited through his lower back. The Earl died forty-nine hours after the incident.

Carnegie of Finhaven was tried for murder in a famous trial which established the "not guilty" verdict (in addition to "proven" and "not proven") in Scots law, as well as the right of Scots juries to try the whole case, rather than just the facts. The case is cited as an example of jury nullification.

== Ancestry ==
Ancestors of Charles Lyon, 6th Earl of Strathmore and Kinghorne

16. Patrick Lyon 1st Earl of Kinghorne
8. John Lyon, 2nd Earl of Kinghorne
17. Lady Anne Murray
4. Patrick Lyon, 3rd Earl of Strathmore and Kinghorne
18. Patrick Maule, 1st Earl of Panmure
9. Lady Elizabeth Maule
19. Frances Stanhope
2. John Lyon, 4th Earl of Strathmore and Kinghorne
20. Robert Middleton
10. John Middleton, 1st Earl of Middleton
21. Elizabeth Strachan
5. Lady Helen Middleton
22. James Durham
11. Grizel Durham
23. Janet Wishart
1. Charles Lyon, 6th Earl of Strathmore and Kinghorne
24. Philip Stanhope, 1st Earl of Chesterfield
12. Henry Stanhope, Lord Stanhope
25. Catherine Hastings
6. Philip Stanhope, 2nd Earl of Chesterfield
26. Thomas Wotton, 2nd Baron Wotton
13. Hon. Katherine Wotton
27. Mary Throckmorton
3. Lady Elizabeth Stanhope
28. Thomas Butler, Viscount Thurles
14. James Butler, 1st Duke of Ormonde
29. Elizabeth Poyntz
7. Lady Elizabeth Butler
30. Richard Preston, 1st Earl of Desmond
15. Lady Elizabeth Preston, 2nd Lady Dingwall
31. Lady Elizabeth Butler

Peerage of Scotland
Preceded by John Lyon	Earl of Strathmore and Kinghorne; 1715–1728	Succeeded by James Lyon
