= John Lyon, 5th Earl of Strathmore and Kinghorne =

Scottish earl (1690–1715)

John Lyon
- Earl of Strathmore and Kinghorne
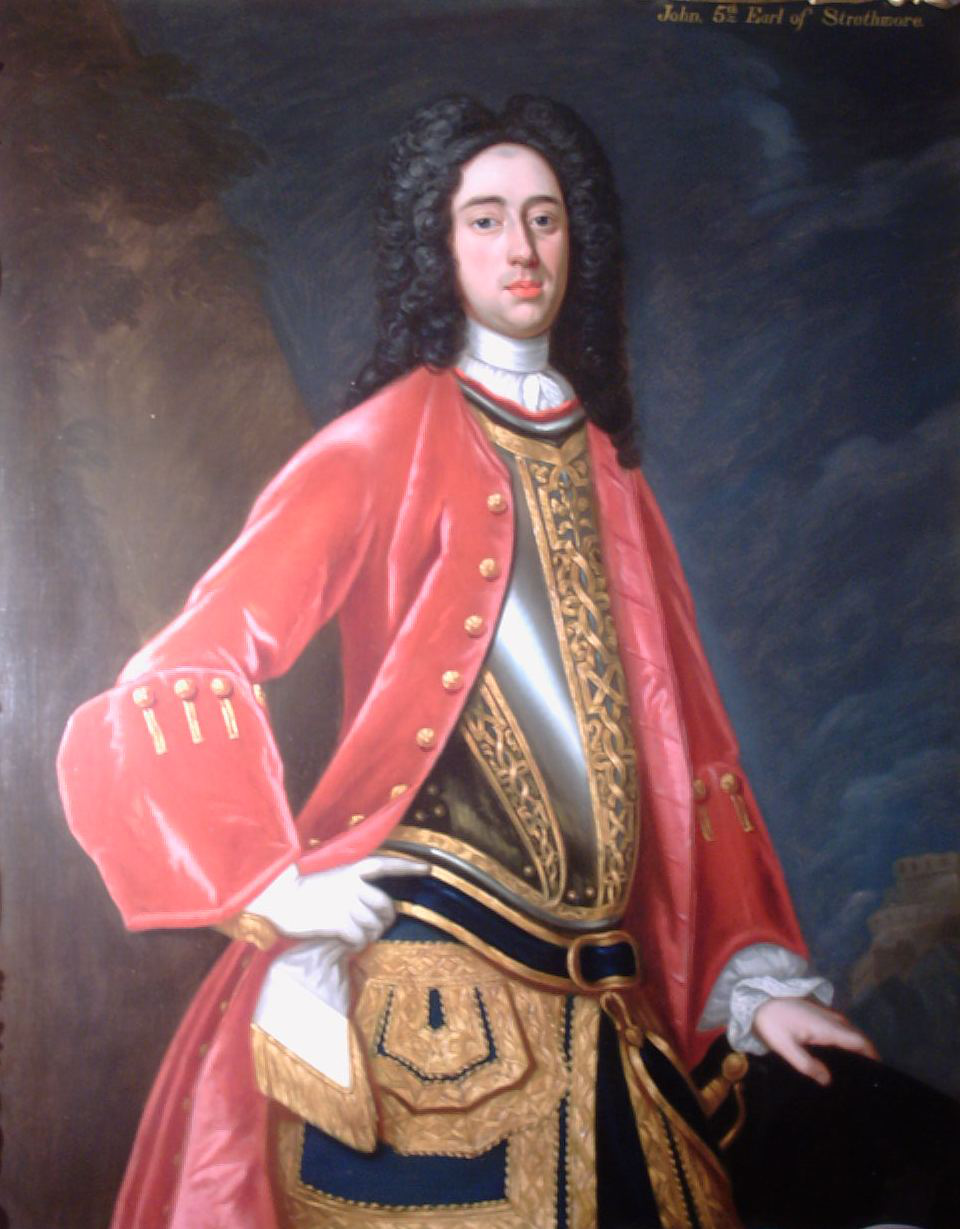
- Tenure: 11 September 1712 – 13 November 1715
- Predecessor: John Lyon, 4th Earl of Strathmore and Kinghorne
- Successor: Charles Lyon, 6th Earl of Strathmore and Kinghorne
- Baptised: 27 April 1690
- Died: 13 November 1715 (aged 25); Sheriffmuir, Scotland, Great Britain
- Noble family: Lyon
- Father: John Lyon, 4th Earl of Strathmore and Kinghorne
- Mother: Elizabeth Lyon, Countess of Strathmore

John Lyon, 5th Earl of Strathmore and Kinghorne (bapt. 27 April 1690 – 13 November 1715) was a Scottish peer and nobleman. He was the son of John Lyon, 4th Earl of Strathmore and Kinghorne. He died fighting with the Jacobites at the Battle of Sheriffmuir on 13 November 1715.. Along side his uncle Patrick Lyon of Auchterhouse

Patrick Lyon was a fervent recruiter to the cause and was a key figure in the trail of James Carnegie of Finhaven in 1716 at Carlisle for High Treason. His threatening letter to Carnegie was a key document in his defence that Lyon has coerced and threatened him and his estate.

== Ancestry ==
Ancestors of John Lyon, 5th Earl of Strathmore and Kinghorne

16. Patrick Lyon, 1st Earl of Kinghorne
8. John Lyon, 2nd Earl of Kinghorne
17. Lady Anne Murray
4. Patrick Lyon, 3rd Earl of Strathmore and Kinghorne
18. Patrick Maule, 1st Earl of Panmure
9. Lady Elizabeth Maule
19. Frances Stanhope
2. John Lyon, 4th Earl of Strathmore and Kinghorne
20. Robert Middleton
10. John Middleton, 1st Earl of Middleton
21. Elizabeth Strachan
5. Lady Helen Middleton
22. James Durham
11. Grizel Durham
23. Janet Wishart
1. John Lyon, 5th Earl of Strathmore and Kinghorne
24. Philip Stanhope, 1st Earl of Chesterfield
12. Henry Stanhope, Lord Stanhope
25. Catherine Hastings
6. Philip Stanhope, 2nd Earl of Chesterfield
26. Thomas Wotton, 2nd Baron Wotton
13. Hon. Katherine Wotton
27. Mary Throckmorton
3. Lady Elizabeth Stanhope
28. Thomas Butler, Viscount Thurles
14. James Butler, 1st Duke of Ormonde
29. Elizabeth Poyntz
7. Lady Elizabeth Butler
30. Richard Preston, 1st Earl of Desmond
15. Lady Elizabeth Preston, 2nd Lady Dingwall
31. Lady Elizabeth Butler

Peerage of Scotland
Preceded by John Lyon	Earl of Strathmore and Kinghorne; 1712–1715	Succeeded by Charles Lyon
