= James Lyon, 7th Earl of Strathmore and Kinghorne =

Scottish peer and freemason

The Right Honourable The Earl of Strathmore and Kinghorne
- Born: ca. 1702
- Died: 1735; Edinburgh, Scotland
- Title: 7th Earl of Strathmore and Kinghorne
- Spouse: Mary Oliphant
- Parent(s): John Lyon, 4th Earl of Strathmore and Kinghorne; Lady Elizabeth Stanhope

James Lyon, 7th Earl of Strathmore (circa 1702 – 1735) was a Scottish peer and freemason.

He was the son of John Lyon, 4th Earl of Strathmore and Kinghorne and Lady Elizabeth Stanhope. He was christened on 24 December 1702. He succeeded as Earl of Strathmore following the stabbing of Charles Lyon, 6th Earl of Strathmore and Kinghorne in a drunken altercation in 1728. On 6 March 1731 he married Mary Oliphant, daughter of Charles Oliphant (brother of William Oliphant, 11th Lord Oliphant). He died without issue on 4 January 1735 at Edinburgh, Scotland.

He was succeeded as earl by his younger brother, Thomas Lyon, 8th Earl of Strathmore and Kinghorne.

== Ancestry ==
Ancestors of James Lyon, 7th Earl of Strathmore and Kinghorne

16. Patrick Lyon 1st Earl of Kinghorne
8. John Lyon, 2nd Earl of Kinghorne
17. Lady Anne Murray
4. Patrick Lyon, 3rd Earl of Strathmore and Kinghorne
18. Patrick Maule, 1st Earl of Panmure
9. Lady Elizabeth Maule
19. Frances Stanhope
2. John Lyon, 4th Earl of Strathmore and Kinghorne
20. Robert Middleton
10. John Middleton, 1st Earl of Middleton
21. Elizabeth Strachan
5. Lady Helen Middleton
22. James Durham
11. Grizel Durham
23. Janet Wishart
1. James Lyon, 7th Earl of Strathmore and Kinghorne
24. Philip Stanhope, 1st Earl of Chesterfield
12. Henry Stanhope, Lord Stanhope
25. Catherine Hastings
6. Philip Stanhope, 2nd Earl of Chesterfield
26. Thomas Wotton, 2nd Baron Wotton
13. Hon. Katherine Wotton
27. Mary Throckmorton
3. Lady Elizabeth Stanhope
28. Thomas Butler, Viscount Thurles
14. James Butler, 1st Duke of Ormonde
29. Elizabeth Poyntz
7. Lady Elizabeth Butler
30. Richard Preston, 1st Earl of Desmond
15. Lady Elizabeth Preston, 2nd Lady Dingwall
31. Lady Elizabeth Butler

Peerage of Scotland
Preceded by Charles Lyon	Earl of Strathmore and Kinghorne; 1728–1735	Succeeded by Thomas Lyon
Masonic offices
Preceded by Anthony Browne, 7th Viscount Montagu	Grand Master of the Premier; Grand Lodge of England; 1733	Succeeded by John Lindsay, 20th Earl of Crawford
