= John Lyon, 1st Thane of Glamis =

Chamberlain of Scotland

Sir John Lyon of Glamis (c. 1340 – 4 November 1382) was a Scottish nobleman who was Chamberlain of Scotland between 1377 and 1382, and 1st Thane of Glamis. He was the progenitor of Clan Lyon, but his own ancestry is dubious.

== Family origins ==
Sir John Lyon was the son of Sir John Lyon (born c. 1290), Baron of Forteviot and of Forgandenny in Perthshire, and Curteton and Drumgowan in Aberdeenshire.

Sir John was the progenitor of Clan Lyon, but his own ancestry is disputed. The usually reliable genealogist Sir Iain Moncreiffe stated that Clan Lyon were of Celtic, not Norman, origin and that they were descended from a younger son of the Clan Lamont. However, it dubiously alternatively has been asserted that Clan Lyon descend from a French family called de Léon.

== Career and death ==
In addition to being Thane of Glamis, Lyon was jure uxoris Thane of Tannadyce. As such, he was among the most powerful nobles in Angus. Upon his marriage to Princess Jean, he acquired the estates of Kinghorn in Fife.

He was first appointed to a position at the Scottish court sometime prior to 1368 in the reign of David II, when he was given the responsibility of examining the records of the Chamberlain. He was appointed Keeper of the Privy Seal upon the accession of Robert II; from c. 1375 he was the Keeper of Edinburgh Castle and was appointed Lord Chamberlain in 1377, both positions he was to hold until his death.

From at least as early as 1367 he started to acquire various properties, from the Earl of Ross in 1367, from John de Hay in 1368. He acquired the thanage of Glamis from his future father-in-law in March 1372. He was knighted sometime prior to 1377. He was killed (perhaps rather treacherously) on 4 November 1382 during a quarrel with Sir James Lindsay of Crawford, nephew of the King, near Menmuir in Angus.

== Marriage and children ==
In 1376, Sir John Lyon married Princess Jean, a daughter of Robert II, by his wife Elizabeth Mure. The Princess was the widow of Sir John Keith, eldest son of the Earl Marischal. Sir John Lyon and the Princess had only one child, a son, also Sir John Lyon. This marriage gave Sir John the lands of Kinghorn, Fife. Furthermore, it enabled him to adopt the armorial bearings of a lion rampant within the double tressure of Scotland. In commemoration of the important union, the Lyon crest alludes to Princess Jean.

On 28 June 1445, his grandson, Patrick Lyon was created Lord Glamis. In 1606, Patrick, 9th Lord Glamis was created Earl of Kinghorne.

== See also ==
- Clan Lyon

== Bibliography ==
- Balfour Paul, Sir James (1904). The Scots Peerage. Vol. XIII. Edinburgh: D. Douglas. pp. 262–268.
