= Elizabeth Lyon, Countess of Strathmore and Kinghorne =

English noblewoman

Lady Elizabeth Stanhope
- Countess of Strathmore and Kinghorne
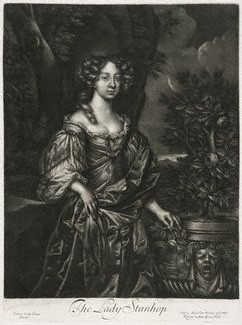
- Portrait of Lady Elizabeth Stanhope in mezzotint c.1680-84, published by Alexander Browne after Sir Peter Lely
- Born: May 1663
- Died: 24 April 1723 (aged 59)
- Spouse: John Lyon, 4th Earl of Strathmore and Kinghorne
- Issue: John Lyon, 5th Earl of Strathmore and Kinghorne; Charles Lyon, 6th Earl of Strathmore and Kinghorne; James Lyon, 7th Earl of Strathmore and Kinghorne; Thomas Lyon, 8th Earl of Strathmore and Kinghorne; 3 additional sons, 3 daughters
- Father: Philip Stanhope, 2nd Earl of Chesterfield (paternity is disputed)
- Mother: Lady Elizabeth Butler

Elizabeth Lyon, Countess of Strathmore and Kinghorne (née Stanhope, May 1663 – 24 April 1723), was an English noblewoman and the wife of Scottish peer John Lyon, 4th Earl of Strathmore and Kinghorne. Born to Lady Elizabeth Butler and Philip Stanhope, 2nd Earl of Chesterfield, her paternity was in doubt. It is possible that her actual father was James, Duke of York, who would in 1685 ascend the throne as King James II of England.

She was the subject of three portraits in mezzotint published by Alexander Browne after Sir Peter Lely. These are displayed at the National Portrait Gallery, in London.

== Family ==
Lady Elizabeth was born in May 1663 at Bretby, Derbyshire, the daughter of Philip Stanhope, 2nd Earl of Chesterfield, and Lady Elizabeth Butler, eldest daughter of James Butler, 1st Duke of Ormonde. Her father had been the lover of the notorious Barbara Villiers, mistress of King Charles II of England. Historian Antonia Fraser describes Elizabeth's mother as having been one of the mistresses of the Duke of York.

== Marriage and issue ==
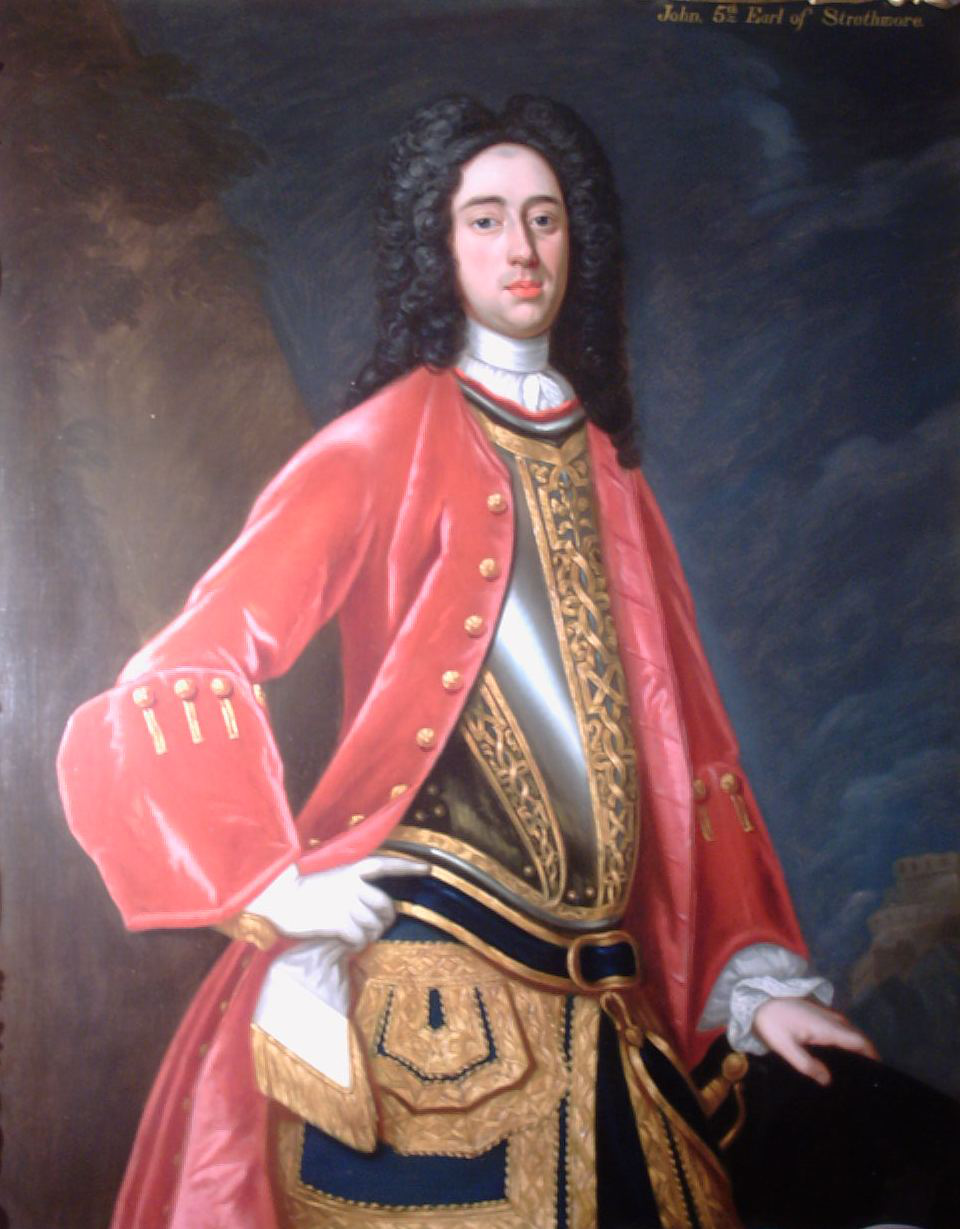
John Lyon, 5th Earl of Strathmore and Kinghorne, Lady Elizabeth's eldest surviving son and a Jacobite, was killed at the Battle of Sheriffmuir

On 21 September 1691, Elizabeth married Scottish nobleman John Lyon, son of Patrick Lyon, 3rd Earl of Strathmore and Kinghorne. In May 1695, almost four years after their marriage, he succeeded his father as the 4th Earl of Strathmore and Kinghorne; and from that time onwards, she was styled Countess of Strathmore and Kinghorne.

Together they had 10 children:

- Patrick Lyon, Lord Glamis (1692- September 1709)
- Philip Lyon, Lord Glamis (29 October 1693 – 18 March 1712), died of smallpox in London; he was unmarried.
- John Lyon, 5th Earl of Strathmore and Kinghorne (27 April 1696 – 13 November 1715), was killed at the Battle of Sheriffmuir while fighting for the Jacobite cause. Died unmarried.
- Charles Lyon, 6th Earl of Strathmore and Kinghorne (baptised 12 July 1699 – 11 May 1728), was killed in a brawl; he married Lady Susan Cochrane, but had no legitimate issue.
- Hendrie Lyon (born 1 July 1700), died young.
- James Lyon, 7th Earl of Strathmore and Kinghorne (baptised 24 December 1702 – 4 January 1735); a Freemason, he married Mary Oliphant, however, their marriage was childless.
- Thomas Lyon, 8th Earl of Strathmore and Kinghorne (baptised 6 July 1704 – 18 January 1753), married Jean Nicholson (died 13 May 1778), by whom he had issue. Elizabeth Bowes-Lyon, Queen consort of King George VI was one of his numerous descendants.
- Lady Helen Lyon (baptised 8 January 1695 – 19 December 1723), married Robert Stuart, 7th Lord Blantyre; her only son died young
- Lady Mary Lyon (baptised 16 April 1697 – 26 May 1780), unmarried.
- Lady Catherine Lyon (baptised 24 April 1707), died young.

== Death ==
Elizabeth died on 24 April 1723 at Castle Lyon in Scotland. She was not quite 60 years old.
