= John Lyon, 4th Earl of Strathmore and Kinghorne =

Scottish nobleman and peer

The Right Honourable The Earl of Strathmore and Kinghorne
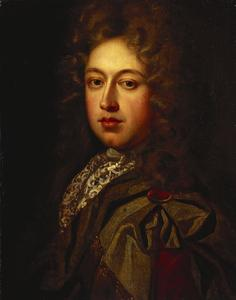
- John Lyon, 4th Earl of Strathmore and Kinghorne
- Born: 1663
- Died: 1712 (aged 48–49)
- Title: 4th Earl of Strathmore and Kinghorne
- Spouse: Lady Elizabeth Stanhope
- Children: John Lyon, 5th Earl of Strathmore and Kinghorne; Charles Lyon, 6th Earl of Strathmore and Kinghorne; James Lyon, 7th Earl of Strathmore and Kinghorne; Thomas Lyon, 8th Earl of Strathmore and Kinghorne; 3 additional sons, 3 daughters
- Parent(s): Patrick Lyon, 3rd Earl of Strathmore and Kinghorne; Helen Middleton

John Lyon, 4th Earl of Strathmore and Kinghorne (1663 – 1712) was a Scottish nobleman and peer. He was the son of Patrick Lyon, 3rd Earl of Strathmore and Kinghorne. He married Elizabeth Stanhope on 21 September 1691 and was succeeded as Earl by his son John Lyon, 5th Earl of Strathmore and Kinghorne.

== Marriage and issue ==
On 21 September 1691, John married Elizabeth Stanhope, daughter of Lady Elizabeth Butler and possibly Philip Stanhope, 2nd Earl of Chesterfield. There are doubts whether he was indeed the father. In May 1695, almost four years after their marriage, he succeeded his father as the 4th Earl of Strathmore and Kinghorne.

Together they had 10 children:

- Patrick Lyon, Lord Glamis (1692 – September 1709)
- Philip Lyon, Lord Glamis (29 October 1693 – 18 March 1712), died of smallpox in London; he was unmarried.
- John Lyon, 5th Earl of Strathmore and Kinghorne (27 April 1696 – 13 November 1715), was killed at the Battle of Sheriffmuir while fighting for the Jacobite cause. Died unmarried.
- Charles Lyon, 6th Earl of Strathmore and Kinghorne (baptised 12 July 1699 – 11 May 1728), was killed in a brawl; he married Lady Susan Cochrane, but had no legitimate issue.
- Hendrie Lyon (born 1 July 1700), died young.
- James Lyon, 7th Earl of Strathmore and Kinghorne (baptised 24 December 1702 – 4 January 1735); a Freemason, he married Mary Oliphant, however, their marriage was childless.
- Thomas Lyon, 8th Earl of Strathmore and Kinghorne (baptised 6 July 1704 – 18 January 1753), married Jean Nicholson (died 13 May 1778), by whom he had issue. Elizabeth Bowes-Lyon, Queen consort of King George VI was one of his numerous descendants.
- Lady Helen Lyon (baptised 8 January 1695 – 19 December 1723), married Robert Stuart, 7th Lord Blantyre; her only son died young
- Lady Mary Lyon (baptised 16 April 1697 – 26 May 1780), unmarried.
- Lady Catherine Lyon (baptised 24 April 1707), died young.

Peerage of Scotland
Preceded by Patrick Lyon	Earl of Strathmore and Kinghorne; 1695–1712	Succeeded by John Lyon
