= Earl of Strathmore and Kinghorne =

Title in the peerage of Scotland and the United Kingdom

- Quarterly: 1st and 4th, Argent a Lion rampant Azure armed and langued Gules within a Double Tressure flory counterflory of the second (for Lyon); 3rd and 4th, Ermine three Bows strings palewise proper (for Bowes); as a Royal Augmentation, granted to the holder of the Earldom only, an Inescutcheon en surtout Azure thereon a Rose Argent barbed Vert seeded Or ensigned with an Imperial Crown proper within a Double Tressure flory counterflory of the second, the said Inescutcheon ensigned with an Earl's Coronet proper.
- Creation date: 1606 (Scottish title); 1937 (British title)
- Peerage: Peerage of Scotland (1606); Peerage of the United Kingdom (1937)
- First holder: Patrick Lyon, 1st Earl of Kinghorne
- Present holder: Simon Bowes-Lyon, 19th and 6th Earl of Strathmore and Kinghorne
- Heir presumptive: The Hon. John Fergus Bowes-Lyon
- Subsidiary titles: Viscount Lyon; Lord Lyon and Glamis; Lord Glamis; Lord Glamis, Tannadyce, Sidlaw and Strathdichtie; Baron Bowes
- Seat: Glamis Castle
- Former seats: Gibside; Streatlam Castle; St Paul's Walden Bury
- Motto: In Te Domine Speravi ("In Thee, O Lord, have I put my trust")

Earl of Strathmore and Kinghorne is a title in the Peerage of Scotland and the Peerage of the United Kingdom. The earl is also Chief of Clan Lyon.

== History ==
The established history of Clan Lyon states that the family is of French origin, with the original name de Leonne, but James Balfour Paul, in his Scots Peerage, states that the family is likely of Celtic origin. The family's earliest recorded possessions, the thanages of Glamis, Glamis, Tannadyce and Belhelvies, were in a Celtic stronghold, while government positions held by family chiefs would have required fluency in Gaelic.

The first recorded family member, John Lyon, Lord of Glamis, was a courtier and diplomat, who was appointed Keeper of the Privy Seal in 1371 on the accession of Robert II. He acquired significant lands, and on 18 March 1372, Robert II granted him "the free barony of Glamuyss in the sheriffdom of Forfar." Glamis has remained the seat of the family ever since. His descendant Patrick Lyon, 1st Lord Glamis was created the first Lord Glamis in the Peerage of Scotland in 1445.

In 1606, the earldom was first created as Earl of Kinghorne in the Peerage of Scotland for Patrick Lyon, the ninth Lord Glamis, who was also created Lord Lyon and Glamis at the same time. In 1677, the designation of the earldom was changed to "Strathmore and Kinghorne" for Patrick Lyon, the third Earl. He was also granted the subsidiary titles of Viscount Lyon and Lord of Glamis, Tannadyce, Sidlaw and Strathdichtie. The 10th Earl sat in the House of Lords as a Scottish representative peer from 1796 to 1806, and again from 1807 to 1812. In 1815, he was created Baron Bowes in the Peerage of the United Kingdom, but upon his death five years later without legitimate issue, the peerage became extinct. The Scottish peerages were inherited by his younger brother, the 11th Earl.

The 11th Earl was succeeded by his grandson, the 12th Earl, who also sat in the House of Lords as a representative peer from 1852 to 1865. He married but left no children, and the peerages were inherited by his brother, the 13th Earl, who sat in the Lords as a representative peer from 1870 until 1892. In 1887, he was created Baron Bowes of Streatlam Castle, in the County of Durham, and of Lunedale, in the County of York, in the Peerage of the United Kingdom. This gave him and his successors an automatic seat in the House of Lords, which the earldom did not entitle them to until the Peerage Act 1963 extended that right to all holders of Scottish peerages. The 13th Earl was succeeded by his son, the 14th Earl, whose daughter Elizabeth married Prince Albert, Duke of York, in 1923; in 1936, Prince Albert succeeded to the throne as King George VI, and in 1937 created his father-in-law Earl of Strathmore and Kinghorne in the Peerage of the United Kingdom, entitling him to sit in the House of Lords with the title and precedence of an earl rather than that of a baron. Thenceforward, he was the 14th and 1st Earl of Strathmore and Kinghorne.

The eldest son of the earl uses Lord Glamis as a courtesy title. Normally, the highest subsidiary title (in this case Viscount Lyon) would be used, but Lord Glamis is used instead to prevent confusion with the officer of arms, Lord Lyon King of Arms. Queen Elizabeth the Queen Mother (1900–2002) was the daughter of the 14th Earl of Strathmore and Kinghorne, and the sister of the 15th Earl.

The family seat is Glamis Castle, in Angus, Scotland. Other family seats were Gibside, near Burnopfield, County Durham and Streatlam Castle, near Barnard Castle in County Durham. The traditional burial place of the Earls of Strathmore and Kinghorne is in an aisle of Glamis parish church.

== Thanes of Glamis (1372) ==
- John Lyon, 1st Thane of Glamis (died 1382)

== Masters of Glamis ==
- John Lyon, 1st Master of Glamis (died 1435)

== Lords Glamis (1445) ==
- Patrick Lyon, 1st Lord Glamis (died 1459)
- Alexander Lyon, 2nd Lord Glamis (died 1486)
- John Lyon, 3rd Lord Glamis (died 1497)
- John Lyon, 4th Lord Glamis (died 1500)
- George Lyon, 5th Lord Glamis (died 1505)
- John Lyon, 6th Lord Glamis (c. 1491–1528)
- John Lyon, 7th Lord Glamis (c. 1521–1558) (forfeit in 1537 but restored in 1543)
- John Lyon, 8th Lord Glamis (c. 1544–1578): see also Thomas Lyon (of Auldbar), Master of Glamis.
- Patrick Lyon, 9th Lord Glamis (c. 1575–1615) (created Earl of Kinghorne in 1606)

== Earls of Kinghorne (1606) ==
- Patrick Lyon, 1st Earl of Kinghorne (c. 1575–1615)
- John Lyon, 2nd Earl of Kinghorne (1596–1646)
- Patrick Lyon, 3rd Earl of Kinghorne (1643–1695) (designation of the earldom changed to "Strathmore and Kinghorne")

== Earls of Strathmore and Kinghorne (1677) ==
- Patrick Lyon, 3rd Earl of Strathmore and Kinghorne (1643–1695)
- John Lyon, 4th Earl of Strathmore and Kinghorne (1663–1712)
  - Patrick Lyon, Lord Glamis (1692–1709)
  - Philip Lyon, Lord Glamis (1693–1712)
- John Lyon, 5th Earl of Strathmore and Kinghorne (1696–1715)
- Charles Lyon, 6th Earl of Strathmore and Kinghorne (c. 1699–1728) – brother of the 5th Earl
- James Lyon, 7th Earl of Strathmore and Kinghorne (c. 1702–1735) – brother of the 5th and 6th Earls
- Thomas Lyon, 8th Earl of Strathmore and Kinghorne (1704–1753) – brother of the 5th, 6th and 7th Earls
- John Bowes, 9th Earl of Strathmore and Kinghorne (1737–1776)
- John Bowes, 10th Earl of Strathmore and Kinghorne (1769–1820; created Baron Bowes in the Peerage of the United Kingdom in 1815)
- Thomas Lyon-Bowes, 11th Earl of Strathmore and Kinghorne (1773–1846) – brother of the 10th Earl
  - Thomas George Lyon-Bowes, Lord Glamis (1801–1834)
    - Thomas Lyon-Bowes, Master of Glamis (1821–1821)
- Thomas Lyon-Bowes, 12th Earl of Strathmore and Kinghorne (1822–1865) – grandson of the 11th Earl
- Claude Bowes-Lyon, 13th Earl of Strathmore and Kinghorne (1824–1904) – brother of the 12th Earl, created Baron Bowes in the Peerage of the United Kingdom in 1887
- Claude George Bowes-Lyon, 14th and 1st Earl of Strathmore and Kinghorne (1855–1944) – maternal grandfather of Queen Elizabeth II. (created Earl of Strathmore and Kinghorne in the peerage of the United Kingdom in 1937)
- Patrick Bowes-Lyon, 15th and 2nd Earl of Strathmore and Kinghorne (1884–1949)
  - John Patrick Bowes-Lyon, Master of Glamis (1910–1941)
- Timothy Bowes-Lyon, 16th and 3rd Earl of Strathmore and Kinghorne (1918–1972)
- Fergus Michael Claude Bowes-Lyon, 17th and 4th Earl of Strathmore and Kinghorne (1928–1987) – first cousin of the 16th Earl, grandson of the 14th Earl
- Michael Fergus Bowes-Lyon, 18th and 5th Earl of Strathmore and Kinghorne (1957–2016)
- Simon Patrick Bowes-Lyon, 19th and 6th Earl of Strathmore and Kinghorne (b. 1986)

The heir presumptive is the present holder's younger brother Hon. John Fergus Bowes-Lyon (b. 1988)
The heir presumptive's heir apparent is his son, Albemarle John Bowes-Lyon (b. 2023)

== Earls of Strathmore and Kinghorne (1937) ==
- Claude Bowes-Lyon, 14th Earl of Strathmore and Kinghorne (1855–1944), father-in-law of George VI, was created Earl of Strathmore and Kinghorne in the peerage of the United Kingdom in 1937, a time when Scottish peers did not automatically have seats in the House of Lords. Subsequent earls have also inherited this peerage.

== Line of succession to the 1937 Creation ==
- Claude George Bowes-Lyon, 14th and 1st Earl of Strathmore and Kinghorne (1855–1944)
  - Patrick Bowes-Lyon, 15th and 2nd Earl of Strathmore and Kinghorne (1884–1949)
    - John Bowes-Lyon, Master of Glamis (1910–1941)
    - Timothy Patrick Bowes-Lyon, 16th and 3rd Earl of Strathmore and Kinghorne (1918–1972)
  - The Hon. Michael Claude Bowes-Lyon (1893–1953)
    - Fergus Michael Claude Bowes-Lyon, 17th and 4th Earl of Strathmore and Kinghorne (1928–1987)
      - Michael Fergus Bowes-Lyon, 18th and 5th Earl of Strathmore and Kinghorne (1957–2016)
        - Simon Patrick Bowes-Lyon, 19th and 6th Earl of Strathmore and Kinghorne (born 1986)
        - (1) The Hon. John Bowes-Lyon (born 1988)
          - (2) Albemarle Bowes-Lyon (born 2023)
        - (3) The Hon. George Bowes-Lyon (born 1991)
  - The Hon. Sir David Bowes-Lyon (1902–1961)
    - (4) Sir Simon Bowes-Lyon (born 1932)
      - (5) Fergus Bowes-Lyon (born 1970)
        - (6) Thomas Bowes-Lyon (born 2002)
      - (7) David Bowes-Lyon (born 1973)
        - (8) William Bowes-Lyon (born 2007)
      - (9) Andrew Bowes-Lyon (born 1979)

== Family tree ==
Lyon and Bowes-Lyon family tree including Earls of Strathmore and Kinghorne and Lords Glamis

Robert II of Scotland; 1316–1390
John Lyon d. 1382; 1st Thane of Glamis	Johanna Stewart
John Lyon of Glamis c. 1377–1435
Lord Glamis, 1445
Patrick Lyon; 1402–1459; 1st Lord Glamis
Alexander Lyon c. 1430–1486; 2nd Lord Glamis	John Lyon; 1431– 1497; 3rd Lord Glamis
John Lyon d. 1500; 4th Lord Glamis
George Lyon d. 1505; 5th Lord Glamis	John Lyon d. 1528; 6th Lord Glamis
John Lyon c. 1521–1558; 7th Lord Glamis	Thomas Lyon d. 1608 styled Master of Glamis
Lord Glamis forfeit 1537, restored 1543
John Lyon d. 1578; 8th Lord Glamis
Earl of Kinghorne (Scotland), 1606
Patrick Lyon c. 1575–1615; 1st Earl of Kinghorne
John Lyon; 1596–1646; 2nd Earl of Kinghorne
Designation of earldom changed to Strathmore and Kinghorne, 1677; Viscount Lyon and Lord of Glamis, Tannadyce, Sidlaw and Strathdichtie (Scotland), 1677
Patrick Lyon; 1643–1695; 3rd Earl of Strathmore and Kinghorne
John Lyon; 1663–1712; 4th Earl of Strathmore and Kinghorne
Patrick Lyon; 1692–1709 styled Lord Glamis	Philip Lyon; 1693–1712 styled Lord Glamis	John Lyon; 1696–1715; 5th Earl of Strathmore and Kinghorne	Charles Lyon c. 1699–1728; 6th Earl of Strathmore and Kinghorne	James Lyon c. 1702–1735; 7th Earl of Strathmore and Kinghorne	Thomas Lyon; 1704–1753; 8th Earl of Strathmore and Kinghorne
Mary Bowes; 1749–1800	John (Lyon) Bowes; 1737–1776; 9th Earl of Strathmore and Kinghorne
Baron Bowes (second creation, United Kingdom), 1815
John Bowes; 1769–1820; 10th Earl of Strathmore and Kinghorne	Thomas Lyon-Bowes; 1773–1846; 11th Earl of Strathmore and Kinghorne
Barony of Bowes (second creation) extinct 1820
Thomas Lyon-Bowes; 1801–1834 styled Lord Glamis
Baron Bowes (third creation, United Kingdom), 1887
Thomas Lyon-Bowes; 1821 styled Master of Glamis	Thomas Lyon-Bowes; 1822–1865; 12th Earl of Strathmore and Kinghorne	Claude Bowes-Lyon; 1824–1904; 13th Earl of Strathmore and Kinghorne
Earl of Strathmore and Kinghorne (UK peerage), 1937
Claude George Bowes-Lyon; 1855–1944; 14th and 1st Earl of Strathmore and Kinghorne
Patrick Bowes-Lyon; 1884–1949; 15th and 2nd Earl of Strathmore and Kinghorne	Michael Bowes-Lyon; 1893–1953	Elizabeth Bowes-Lyon; 1900–2002	David Bowes-Lyon; 1902–1961; Lord Lieutenant of Hertfordshire
John Bowes-Lyon; 1910–1941 styled Master of Glamis	Timothy Patrick Bowes-Lyon; 1918–1972; 16th and 3rd Earl of Strathmore and Kinghorne	Fergus Michael Claude Bowes-Lyon; 1928–1987; 17th and 4th Earl of Strathmore and Kinghorne	Elizabeth II; 1926–2022; Queen of the United Kingdom	Simon Bowes-Lyon b. 1932; Lord Lieutenant of Hertfordshire
Michael Fergus Bowes-Lyon; 1957–2016; 18th and 5th Earl of Strathmore and Kinghorne	Charles III b. 1948; King of the United Kingdom	Fergus Bowes-Lyon b. 1970
Simon Patrick Bowes-Lyon b. 1986; 19th and 6th Earl of Strathmore and Kinghorne	John Bowes-Lyon b. 1988	George Bowes-Lyon b. 1991	Thomas Bowes-Lyon b. 2002
Heir presumptive to the Earldom of Strathmore and Kinghorne

== Arms ==
Coat of arms of the Earl of Strathmore and Kinghorne
Crest Between two Slips of Laurel a Demi Lady to the girdle habited and holding in her right hand a Thistle all prope. Escutcheon Quarterly: 1st and 4th, Argent a Lion rampant Azure armed and langued Gules within a Double Tressure flory counterflory of the second (for Lyon); 3rd and 4th, Ermine three Bows strings palewise proper (for Bowes); as a Royal Augmentation, granted to the holder of the Earldom only, an Inescutcheon en surtout Azure thereon a Rose Argent barbed Vert seeded Or ensigned with an Imperial Crown proper within a Double Tressure flory counterflory of the second, the said Inescutcheon ensigned with an Earl's Coronet proper. Supporters On the dexter side an Unicorn Argent armed unguled maned and tufted Or, and on the sinister side a Lion per fess Or and Gules. Motto In Te Domine Speravi (In Thee, O Lord, have I put my trust) Symbolism The Arms of the Earls of Strathmore and Kinghorne are famous for being canting as they represent the name of the holders of the title: Bowes-Lyon in that they feature bows and lions.

== See also ==
- Bowes-Lyon family
- Clan Lyon
- records of the County Durham estates are held by Durham County Record Office
