= Thomas Lyon-Bowes, Master of Glamis (born 1821) =

British noble, born and died 1821

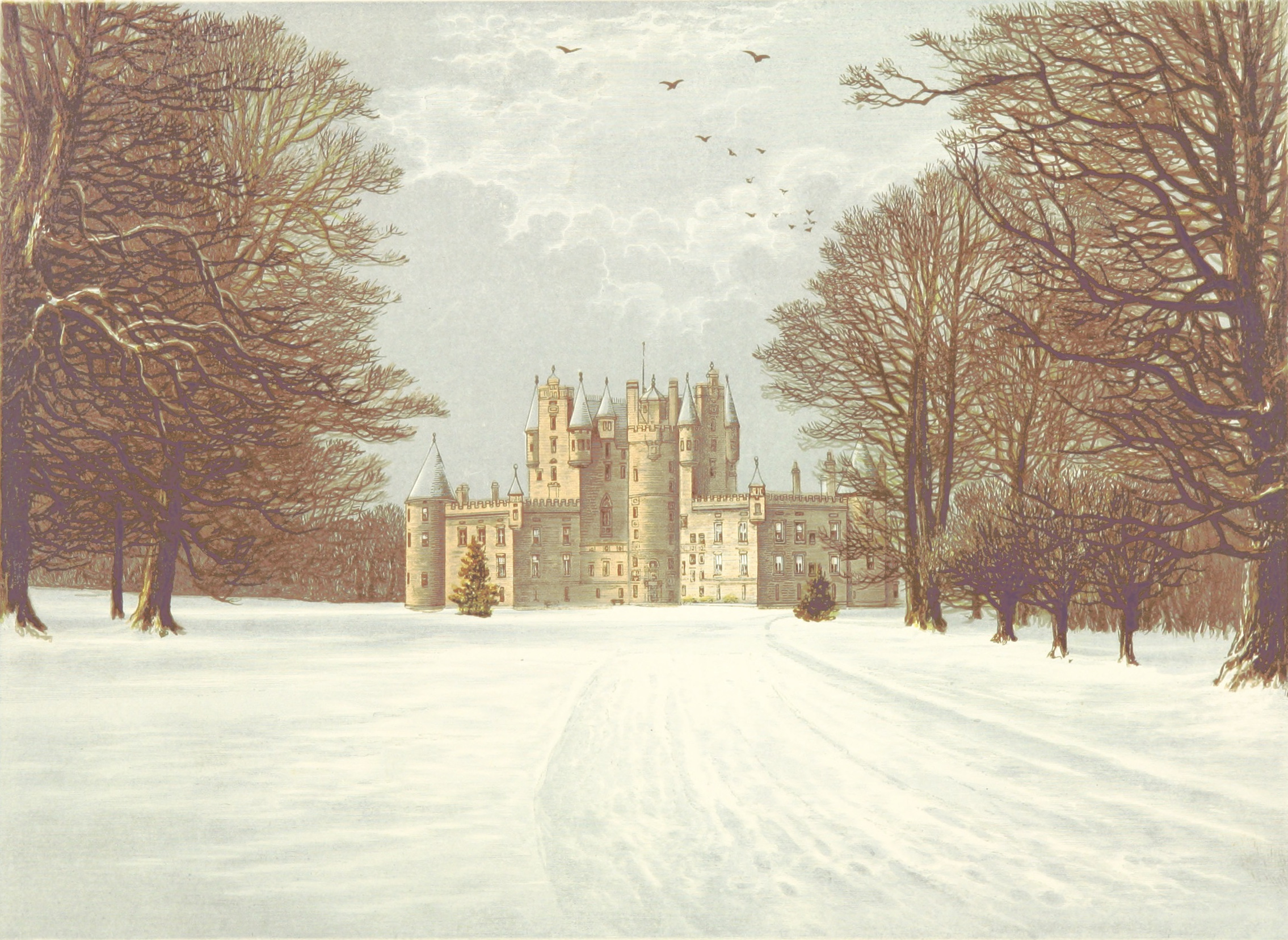
Glamis Castle

Thomas Lyon-Bowes (born and died 21 October 1821) was the first child of Thomas Lyon-Bowes, Lord Glamis, and his wife Charlotte Lyon-Bowes née Grimstead, great-grandparents of Elizabeth Bowes-Lyon (who became queen consort of the United Kingdom in 1936). Although Robert Douglas' Peerage of Scotland records Thomas as "born and died, October 21, 1821", rumours began to circulate during the late-19th century that the child had been born deformed, and had therefore been brought up in seclusion hidden away in Glamis Castle in Angus, Scotland, giving rise to the sobriquet of the Monster of Glamis, or the Horror of Glamis.

== Mystery of Glamis ==
Rumours of Thomas Lyon-Bowes' survival, as recounted by James Wentworth Day in his 1967 book The Queen Mother's Family Story, appear to have started in local villages as the result of an account by the midwife, whose name is unrecorded. The deformed child was alleged to have been in good health when the midwife left, causing suspicion when his death was announced a day or two later. The story was discussed during the latter half of the 19th century, when "Miss M. Gilchrist, writing in 1885, was not only confident that such a monster did actually exist, but even described him – half frog, half man!!", also claiming he was the rightful earl. Details published about the mystery of Glamis during the reign of Queen Victoria scarcely mention a monster and are instead focused on the possibility of members of a rival clan dying while locked in the secret room. The earliest surviving reference dates from 1908, in which it was claimed that "in the Castle of Glamis is a secret chamber. In this chamber is confined a monster, who is the rightful heir to the title and property, but who is so unpresentable that it is necessary to keep him out of sight and out of possession." The child Thomas has no gravestone; as the child had been baptised at birth, this has been used to support the conjecture of survival. However, the fact that Thomas Lyon-Bowes, as a child who died in infancy, has no individual gravestone is in keeping with the funeral customs of the time, when – owing to high rates of infant mortality – usually only adults were commemorated in this way. While dedicated funerary monuments for children do exist, they are comparatively rare.

During a visit to Glamis the Queen Mother's biographer Michael Thornton was allegedly told by the sixteenth Earl that the entrance to the chamber where Thomas lived had been bricked up after his death. Some accounts also came from singer and composer Virginia Gabriel, who stayed at the castle in 1870. According to Raymond Lamont Brown, a folklorist writing an account of tales associated with Glamis, while stories of a concealed chamber are likely to have a factual basis, he asserts the family emphatically deny rumours about a monster.

== See also ==
- Nerissa and Katherine Bowes-Lyon

== Bibliography ==
- Lamont Brown, Raymond (1996), Scottish Folklore, Birlinn, ISBN 978-1-874744-58-0
