= Simon Bowes-Lyon, 19th Earl of Strathmore and Kinghorne =

British peer and sex offender

The Right Honourable The Earl of Strathmore and Kinghorne
- Born: Simon Patrick Bowes-Lyon, Lord Glamis; 18 June 1986 (age 40); London, England
- Other name: Sam Bowes-Lyon
- Criminal charges: Sexual assault
- Criminal penalty: 10 months imprisonment
- Criminal status: Released after serving five months
- Parent(s): Michael Bowes-Lyon, 18th Earl of Strathmore and Kinghorne; Isobel Weatherall

Simon Patrick Bowes-Lyon, 19th and 6th Earl of Strathmore and Kinghorne (born 18 June 1986), styled as Lord Glamis until 2016, is a Scottish peer and landowner, the owner of estates based at Glamis Castle.

The eldest son of Michael Bowes-Lyon, 18th Earl of Strathmore and Kinghorne, and his first wife, Isobel Weatherall, he is a second cousin once removed of King Charles III, whose maternal grandmother was a Bowes-Lyon.

In 2021, Strathmore pleaded guilty to sexually assaulting a woman at his ancestral home, Glamis Castle, and as a result served five months in prison.

== Biography ==
Simon Patrick Bowes-Lyon was born on 18 June 1986 into the Bowes-Lyon family. His father, Michael Bowes-Lyon, 18th Earl of Strathmore and Kinghorne, was a politician, soldier, and businessman, as well as a hereditary peer. His mother is Isobel Weatherall, daughter of Captain Anthony Edward Weatherall. He attended Sunningdale School. His parents divorced in 2004.

Strathmore is a great-great-nephew of Queen Elizabeth the Queen Mother and thus a second cousin once removed of King Charles III and third cousin of his son, Prince William. In 2002, he walked alongside his father and members of the royal family behind the coffin of the Queen Mother during her funeral.

On his father's death on 27 February 2016, the then-Lord Glamis succeeded as 19th Earl. In 2019, he was living at Glamis Castle. In 2017 Strathmore decided to renovate Glamis House, a property on his estate and a childhood home of the Queen Mother, for use as a self-catering holiday home. From 2016 to 2018, he was a director of Ark Hill Wind Farm Ltd. Strathmore is the chieftain of the Strathmore Highland Games, which takes place annually in the grounds of Glamis Castle.

== Convictions and controversies ==
=== Speeding conviction ===
In 2010, Lord Glamis, as he then was styled, was convicted of speeding by riding his motorbike at 100 mph (160 km/h) on a public road with a 60 mph (97 km/h) limit. He was banned from driving for nine months.

=== COVID-19 violation ===
In June 2020, Durham Police contacted the Earl for violating the COVID-19-related travel restrictions then in place. A report said Strathmore travelled 200 miles (320 km) to Holwick Lodge, Middleton-in-Teesdale, and that his butler was spotted buying newspapers.

=== Sexual assault conviction ===
In 2021, Strathmore was charged with sexual assault after admitting to attacking a 26-year-old woman at his Scottish home, Glamis Castle, in early 2020. On 12 January 2021, Strathmore was granted bail and placed on the Violent and Sex Offender Register (ViSOR) by Sheriff Alistair Carmichael at Dundee Sheriff Court. His conviction attracted attention in both the British and the international press, due to his connection with the royal family. The Times reported calls for Strathmore to be removed as the Chieftain of the annual Strathmore Highland Games and as the President of the Angus Ball. On 23 February 2021, he was sentenced to ten months' imprisonment and placed on the sex offenders register for 10 years. At Dundee Sheriff Court, Sheriff Carmichael acknowledged that Strathmore had pleaded guilty - which removed the need for a trial - meaning "the complainer did not have to go through the experience of giving evidence". Further commenting that, "in mitigation; Strathmore had apologised to the woman soon after the assault, had expressed remorse, had accepted responsibility for his actions, and had no previous convictions and appeared to be otherwise of good character. The seriousness of this sexual assault takes this crime over the custodial threshold and must therefore consider imposing a custodial sentence". Strathmore was released after serving five months.

=== Drink driving conviction ===
On 10 November 2023, the Earl was convicted of drink driving at Perth Sheriff Court. The Earl gave a reading of 55 mcg per 100 ml of breath; the legal limit is 22 mcg, therefore, he was 2.5 times over the legal limit. As part of a plea deal with the Crown Office and Procurator Fiscal Service a charge of driving at 88 mph (142 km/h) was dropped. He was banned from driving for a period of 16 months and ordered to pay a fine of £1000.

== Titles and styles ==
- 18 June 1986 − 27 February 2016: Lord Glamis
- 27 February 2016 – present: The Right Honourable The Earl of Strathmore and Kinghorne

In addition to the Earldom of Strathmore and Kinghorne, Strathmore holds the following subsidiary titles: 17th Viscount Lyon, 19th Lord Lyon and Glamis, 26th Lord Glamis, 17th Lord Glamis, Tannadyce, Sidlaw and Strathdichtie, and 7th Baron Bowes, of Streatlam Castle.

Peerage of Scotland
Preceded by Michael Bowes-Lyon	Earl of Strathmore and Kinghorne; 2016–present	Incumbent; Heir: The Hon. John Bowes-Lyon
Peerage of the United Kingdom
Preceded by Michael Bowes-Lyon	Earl of Strathmore and Kinghorne; 2016–present	Incumbent; Heir: The Hon. John Bowes-Lyon
Orders of precedence in the United Kingdom
Preceded by The Earl of Perth	Gentlemen; The Earl of Strathmore and Kinghorne	Succeeded by The Earl of Haddington
