= Thanage =

System of nobility

A thanage was an area of land held by a thegn in Anglo-Saxon England.

Thanage can also denote the rank held by such a thegn.

In medieval Scotland David I, an Anglophile, introduced "thanes" to replace the Gaelic "tòiseach". Therefore, Scottish thanage denotes the land and duties held and undertaken by the thanes.
