= Janet Wishart =

Scottish woman accused of witchcraft

- Died: 1597; Aberdeen's Mercat Cross
- Cause of death: Burnt at the stake
- Other name: The Great Witch of Scotland
- Spouse: John Leyis
- Children: Thomas Leyis; Elspet Leyis; Violet Leyis; Jonet Leyis
- Conviction: Witchcraft
- Penalty: Death
- Accomplice: Thomas Leyis

Janet Wishart (died 1597, Aberdeen, Scotland), was an accused witch from Aberdeen who became known as the Great Witch of Scotland. Wishart was an important figure in the great Scottish witchcraft panic of 1597 as her family were the focus of the trials in Aberdeen where 22 women and one man were found guilty of witchcraft.

== Accusation of witchcraft ==
Accusations spread that a group of witches including Wishart were dancing and playing music with the devil in the area between Fish Cross and Flesh Cross in Castlegate, Aberdeen, at midnight on Halloween, 1596.

In the investigation that followed, Wishart had 31 dittays (indictments) made against her spanning over a 24 year period. She was put on trial along with her husband John Leyis, her son Thomas Leyis, and her three daughters Elspet, Violet and Jonet.

== Death ==
Wishart was sentenced to be put to death by burning at the stake at Mercat Cross, Aberdeen. This was unusual for the time as in most instances accused witches in Scotland were strangled before burning so her treatment was even more inhumane.

The cost of her execution was eleven pounds and ten shillings. This was to cover the expense of the peat, tar and coals as well as payment for the executioner.

Her husband John and three daughters were found innocent of witchcraft but were banned from the city due to their association with Janet Wishart.

Janet's son Thomas, who had named other witches, was also subsequently burnt to death.
