= Glamis Castle =

Castle in Glamis, Angus, Scotland

- Near Glamis, Angus, Scotland, United Kingdom
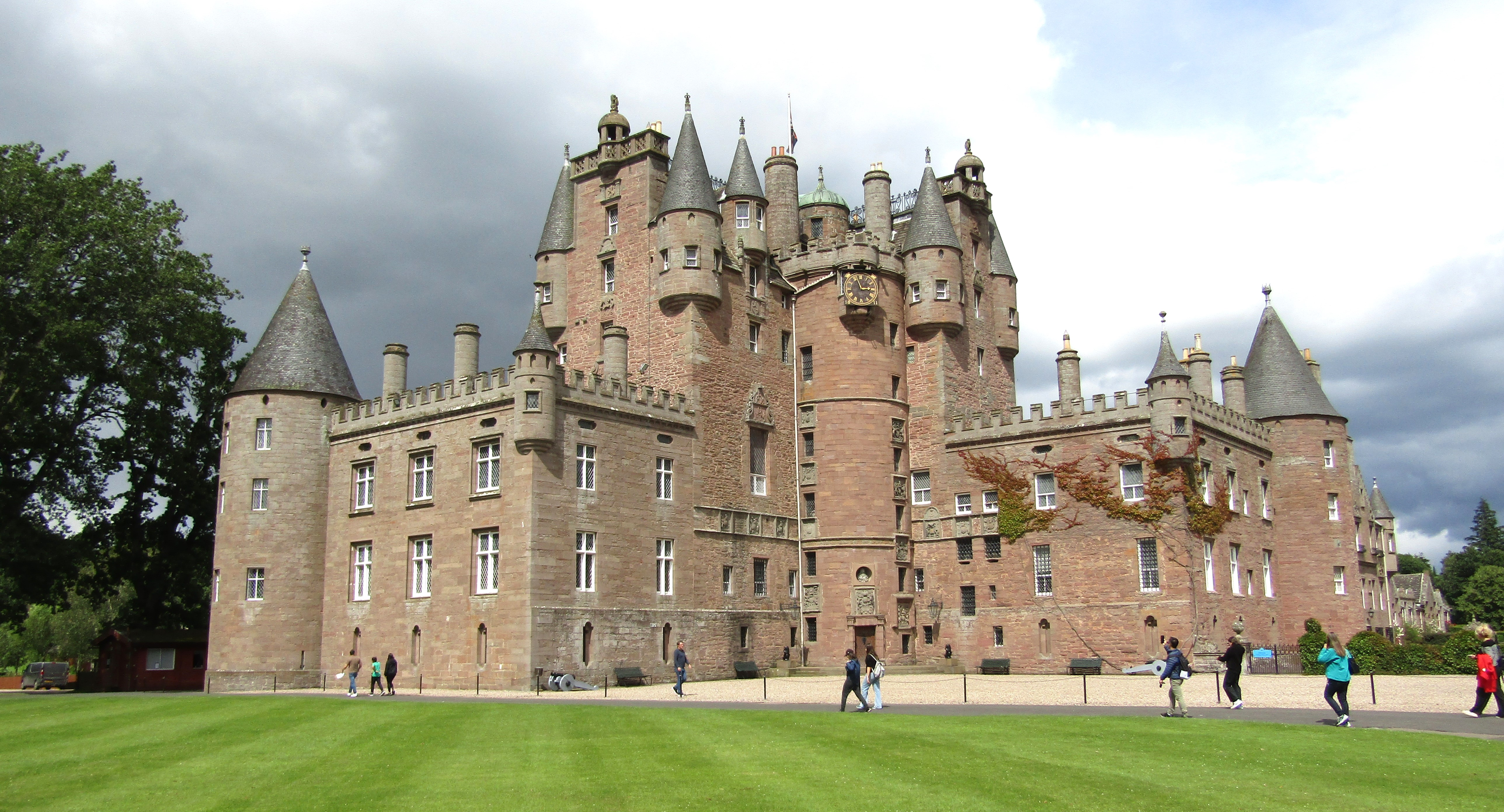
- The castle in 2024

Site information
- Open to the public: Yes
- Condition: Preserved

Location
- Location within Angus
- Coordinates: 56.6203°N 3.0024°W

Site history
- Materials: Stone

Designations

Inventory of Gardens and Designed Landscapes in Scotland
- Official name: Glamis Castle
- Designated: 30 June 1987
- Reference no.: GDL00189

Glamis Castle is situated beside the village of Glamis (/ˈɡlɑːmz/, glahmz) in Angus, Scotland. It is the home of the Earl of Strathmore and Kinghorne, and is open to the public.

Glamis Castle has been the home of the Lyon family since the 14th century, though the present building dates largely from the 17th century. Glamis Castle was the childhood home of Queen Elizabeth the Queen Mother. Her second daughter, Princess Margaret was born there on 21 August 1930.

The castle is protected as a category A listed building, and the grounds are included on the Inventory of Gardens and Designed Landscapes in Scotland, the national listing of significant gardens.

== Setting ==
Glamis is set in the broad and fertile lowland valley of Strathmore, in Forfar, county town of Angus, which lies between the Sidlaw Hills to the south and the Grampian Mountains to the north, approximately 20 kilometres (12 mi) inland from the North Sea. The estate surrounding the castle covers more than 57 square kilometres (14,000 acres) and, in addition to parks and gardens, produces several cash crops including lumber and beef.

A mile-long avenue on the grounds is lined with daffodils. In addition other notable features include two streams running through the estate: one of them the Glamis Burn. An arboretum overlooking Glamis Burn features trees from all over the world, many of them rare and several hundred years old.

== History ==
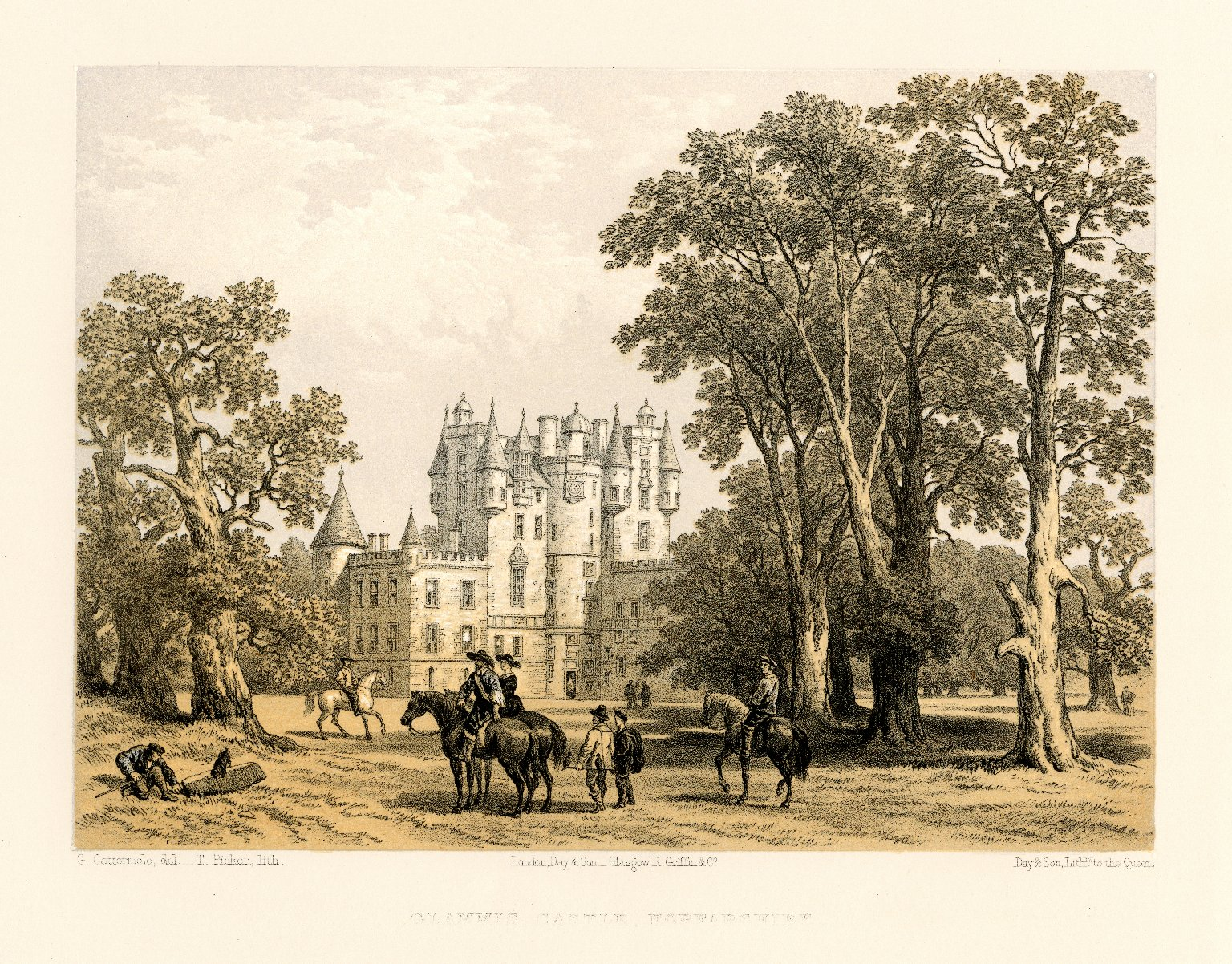
A lithograph of Glamis Castle, created between 1847 and 1854

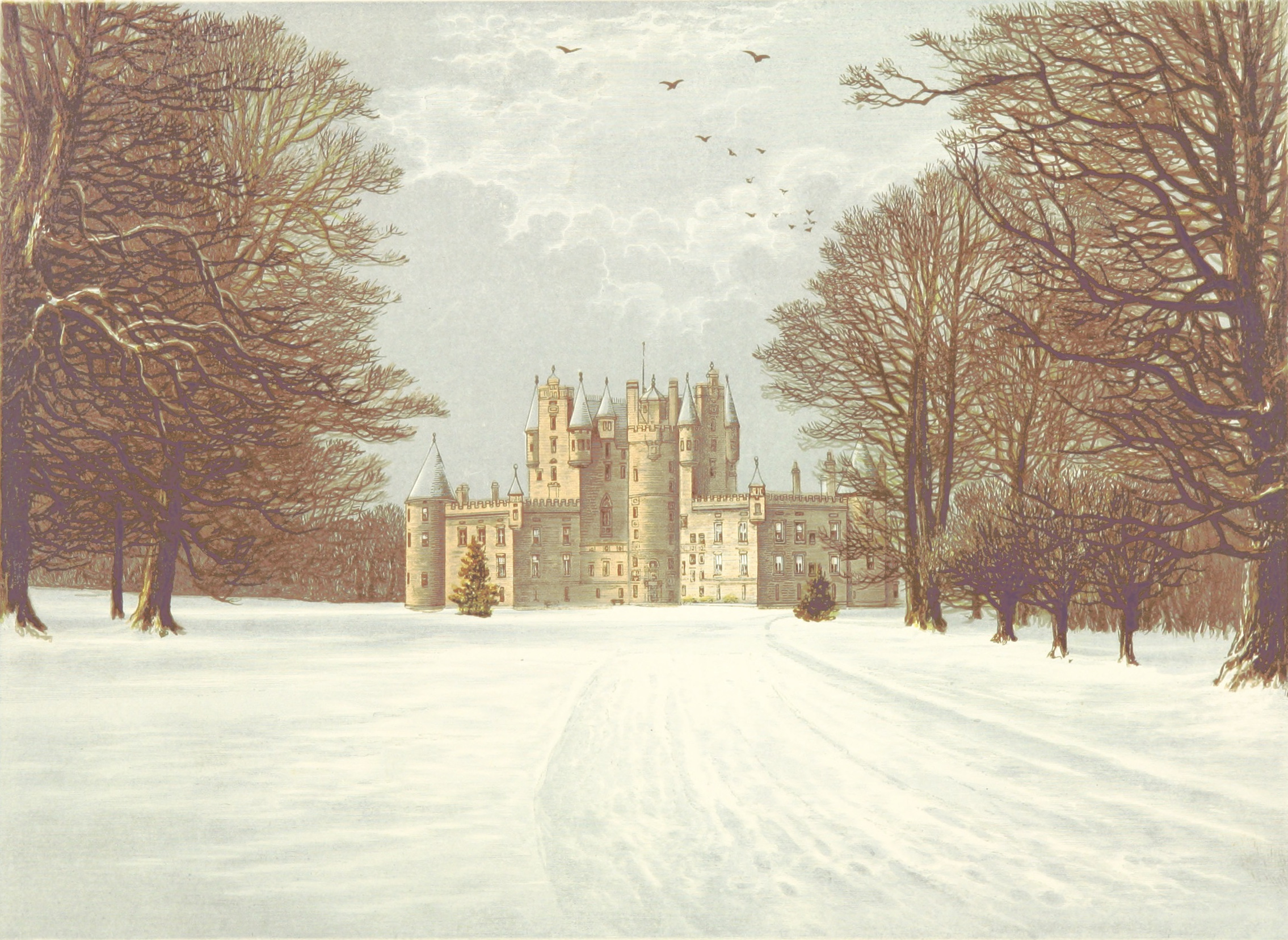
Glamis Castle in the snow, circa 1880

Portal. Royal Coat of Arms

The vicinity of Glamis Castle has prehistoric traces; for example, a noted intricately carved Pictish stone known as the Eassie Stone was found in a creek-bed at the nearby village of Eassie.

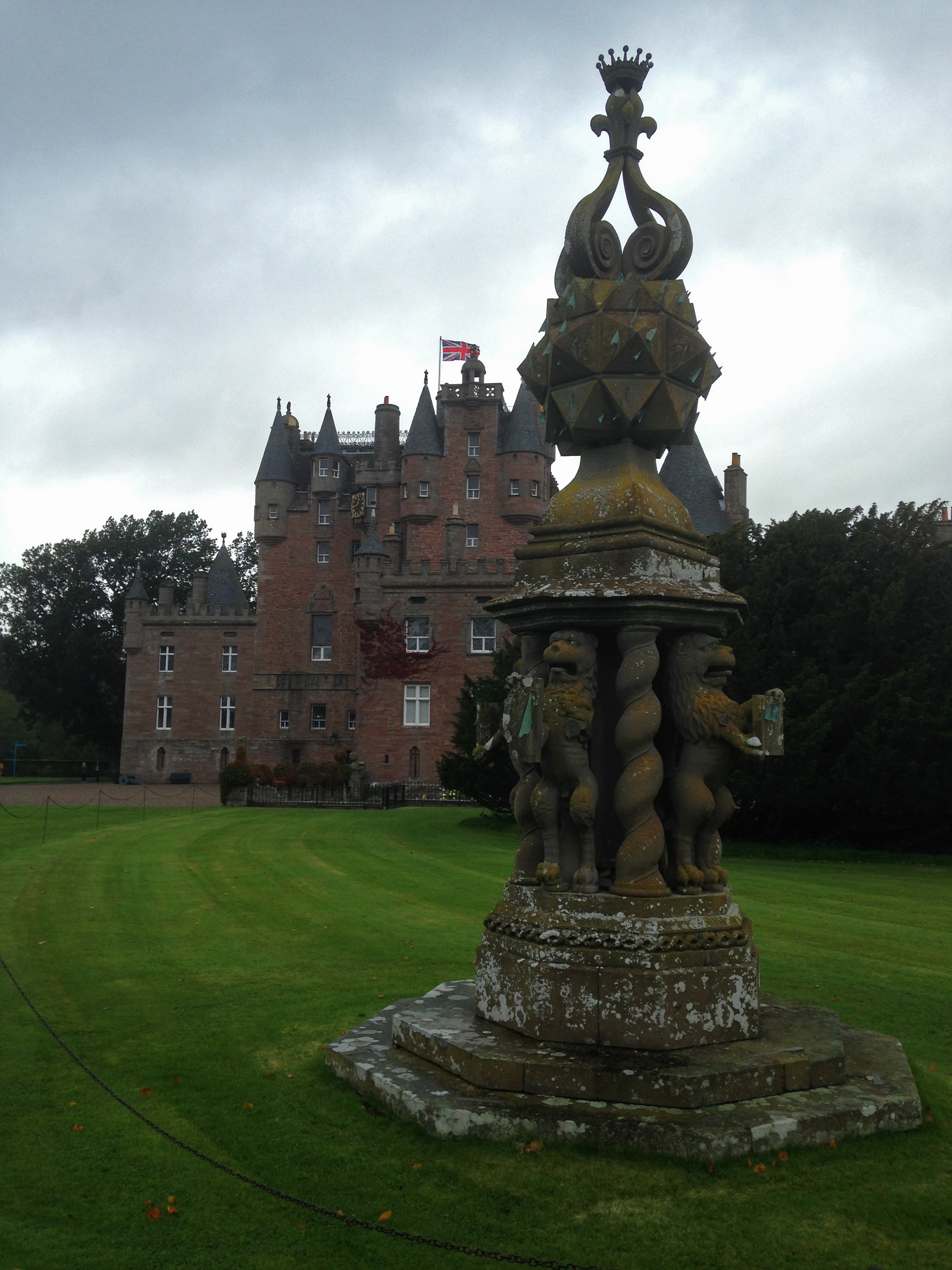
Lion sculptures of The Great Sundial on the front lawn

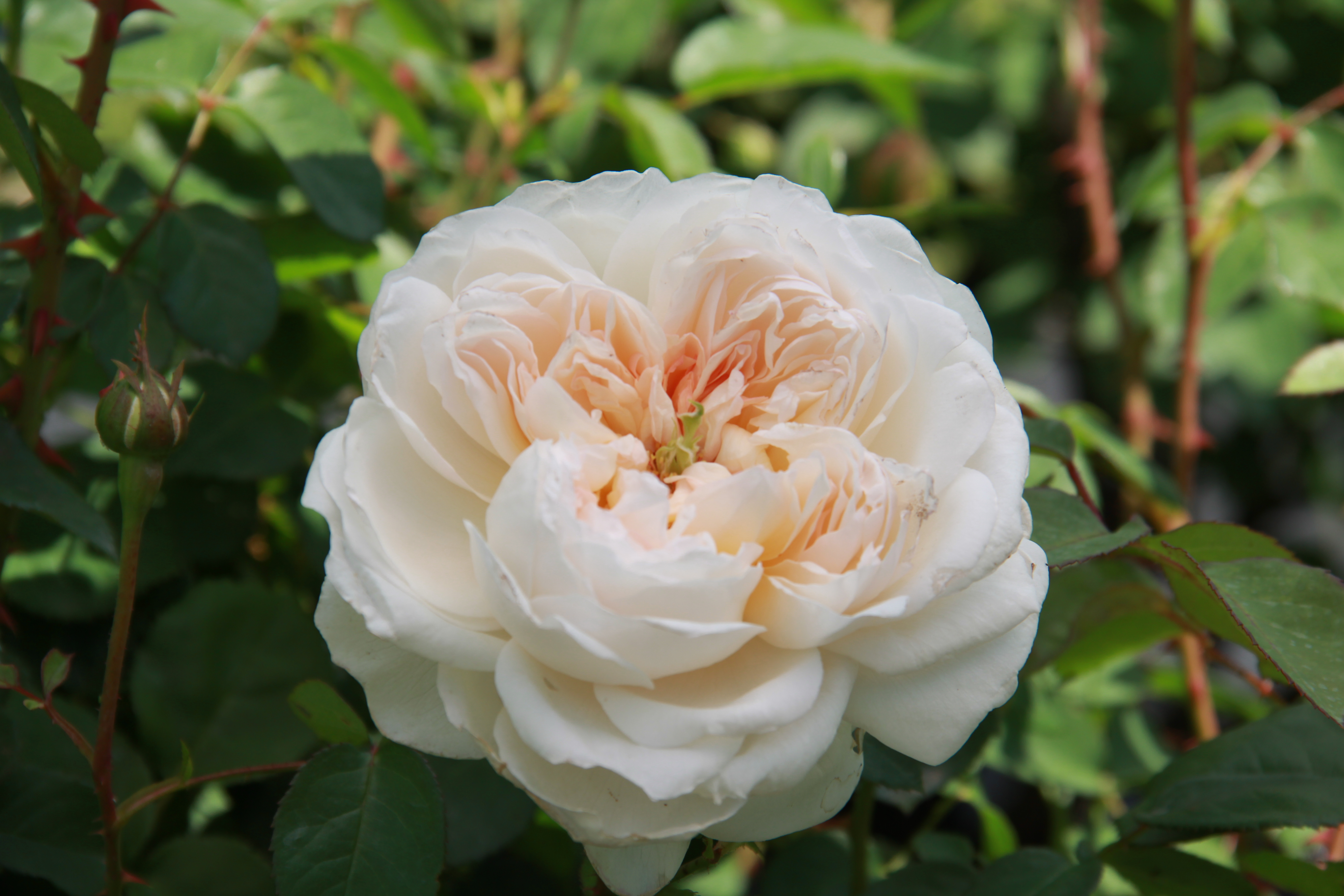
Rosa 'Glamis Castle', a rose was named after Glamis Castle by the English rosegrower David Austin

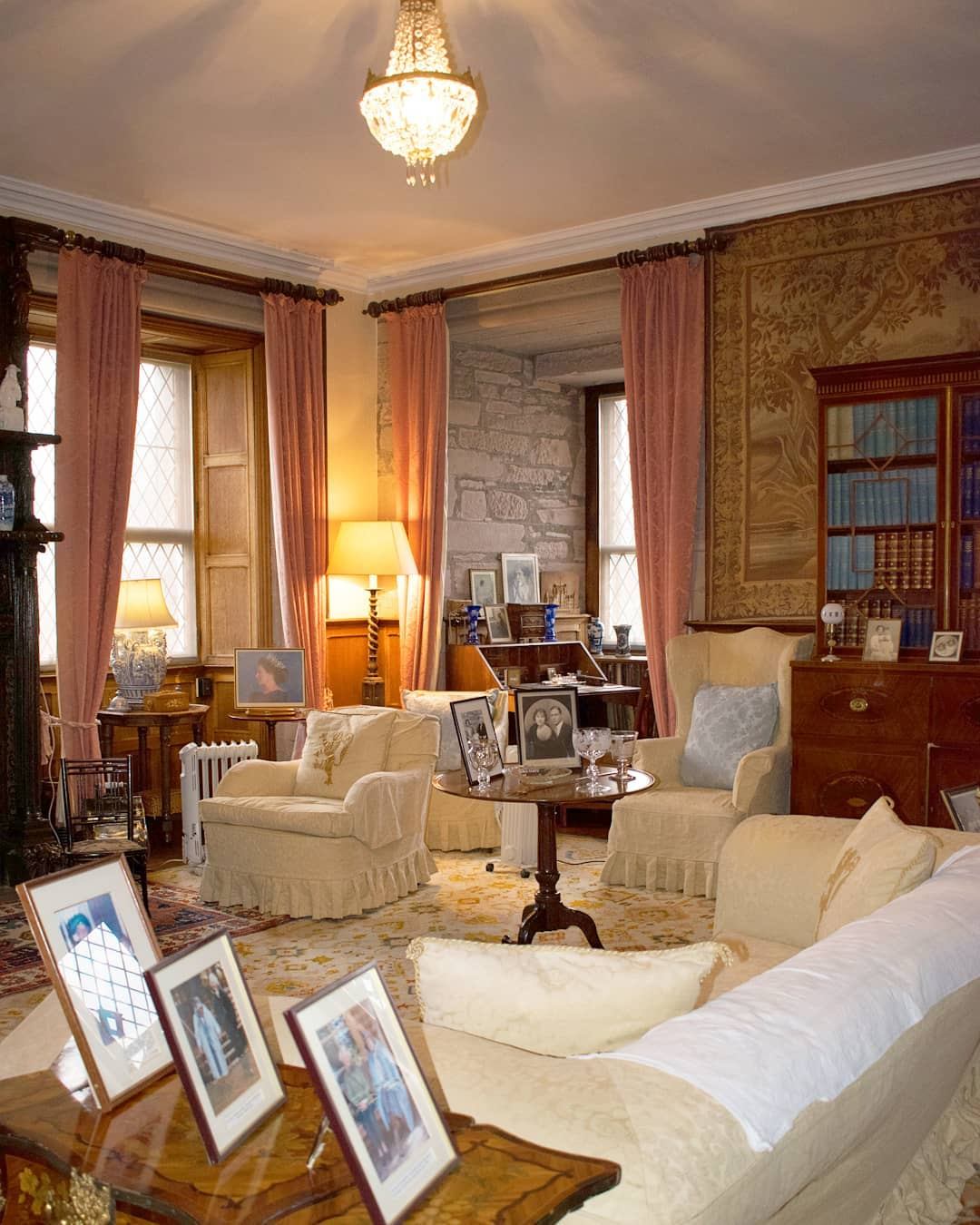
Sitting room or family room at Glamis.

In 1034, Malcolm II was murdered at Glamis, where there was a Royal Hunting Lodge. In William Shakespeare's play Macbeth (1603–06), the eponymous character resides at Glamis Castle, although the historical King Macbeth (d. 1057) had no connection to the castle.

By 1372, a castle had been built at Glamis, since in that year it was granted by Robert II to Sir John Lyon, Thane of Glamis, husband of the king's daughter. Glamis has remained in the Lyon (later Bowes-Lyon) family since this time. The castle was rebuilt as an L-plan tower house in the early 15th century.

The title Lord Glamis was created in 1445 for Sir Patrick Lyon (1402–1459), grandson of Sir John. John Lyon, 6th Lord Glamis, married Janet Douglas, daughter of the Master of Angus, at a time when James V was feuding with the Douglases. In December 1528, Janet was accused of treason for bringing supporters of the Earl of Angus to Edinburgh. She was then charged with poisoning her husband, Lord Glamis, who had died on 17 September 1528. Eventually, she was accused of witchcraft, and was burned at the stake at Edinburgh on 17 July 1537. James V subsequently seized the castle. He stayed at Glamis in November 1538.

In 1543, Glamis was returned to John Lyon, 7th Lord Glamis. In 1606, Patrick Lyon, 9th Lord Glamis, was created Earl of Kinghorne. He began major works on the castle, commemorated by the inscription "Built by Patrick, Lord Glamis, and D[ame] Anna Murray" on the central tower. The English architect Inigo Jones has traditionally been linked to the redesign of the castle, though Historic Scotland consider the King's Master Mason William Schaw a more likely candidate, due to the traditional Scottish style of the architecture.

During the Commonwealth of England, Scotland, and Ireland, soldiers were garrisoned at Glamis. In 1670, Patrick Lyon, 3rd Earl of Strathmore and Kinghorne, returned to the castle and found it uninhabitable. Restorations took place until 1689, including the creation of a major Baroque garden. John Lyon, 9th Earl of Strathmore and Kinghorne, succeeded in 1753, and in 1767 he married Mary Eleanor Bowes, heiress to a coal-mining fortune. He set about improving the grounds of the castle in the picturesque style in the 1770s. The south-west wing was rebuilt after a fire in the early 19th century. In the 1920s, a huge fireplace from Gibside, the Bowes-Lyon estate near Gateshead, was removed and placed in Glamis' Billiard Room. The fireplace displays the coat of arms of the Blakiston family; Gibside heiress Elizabeth Blakiston had married Sir William Bowes. Several interiors, including the Dining Room, also date from the 18th and 19th centuries.

In 1900, Lady Elizabeth Bowes-Lyon was born, the youngest daughter of Claude Bowes-Lyon, 14th Earl of Strathmore and Kinghorne and his wife, Cecilia (née Cavendish-Bentinck). She spent much of her childhood at Glamis, which was used during the First World War as a military hospital. She was particularly instrumental in organising the rescue of the castle's contents during a serious fire on 16 September 1916. On 26 April 1923 she married Prince Albert, Duke of York, second son of George V, at Westminster Abbey. Their second daughter, Princess Margaret, was born at Glamis Castle in 1930.

Since 1987, an illustration of the castle has featured on the reverse side of ten pound notes issued by the Royal Bank of Scotland. Glamis is currently the home of Simon Bowes-Lyon, 19th Earl of Strathmore and Kinghorne, who succeeded to the earldom in 2016.

== Statuary ==
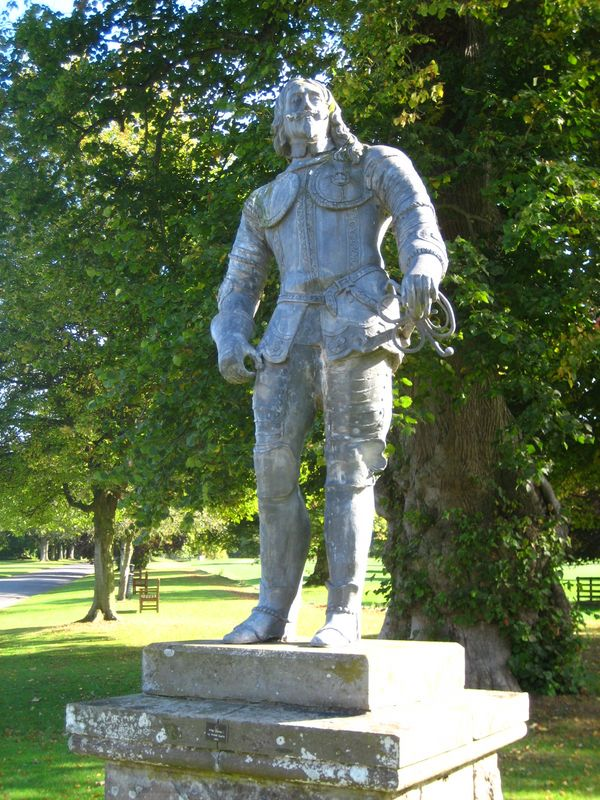
Statue of King Charles I, Glamis

In the 17th century four "brazen" statues were placed on the approach avenue: Charles I in boots; James VI in a stole; Charles II in Roman dress; and James VII as in his Whitehall portrait. The first two were sculpted by Arnold Quellin.

== Legends and tales ==
=== The Monster of Glamis ===
The most famous legend connected with the castle is that of the Monster of Glamis, a hideously deformed child born to the family. Some accounts came from singer and composer Virginia Gabriel, who stayed at the castle in 1870. In the story, the monster was kept in the castle all his life and his suite of rooms bricked up after his death. Another monster is supposed to have dwelt in Loch Calder near the castle.

An alternative version of the legend is that to every generation of the family a vampire child is born and is walled up in that room.

There is an old story that guests staying at Glamis once hung towels from the windows of every room in a bid to find the bricked-up suite of the monster. When they looked at it from outside, several windows were apparently towel-less. Though this is more likely due to the owners removing them in order so that the guests would not find the rooms, according to several relatives of the family.

The legend of the monster may have been inspired by the true story of the Ogilvies.

=== Earl Beardie ===
A legend tells of the 15th-century "Earl Beardie," who has been identified with both Alexander Lyon, 2nd Lord Glamis (died 1486), and with Alexander Lindsay, 4th Earl of Crawford (died 1453). Several versions exist, but they all involve "Earl Beardie" playing cards. However, it was the sabbath, and either his hosts refused to play, or a servant advised him to stop. Lord Beardie became so furious that he claimed that he would play until doomsday, or with the Devil himself, depending on the version. A stranger then appears at the castle and joins Lord Beardie in a game of cards. The stranger is identified with the Devil, who takes Earl Beardie's soul and, in some versions, condemns the Earl to play cards until doomsday.

=== The 1728 Finhaven Trial ===
A prominent full-length portrait of Charles Lyon, 6th Earl of Strathmore and Kinghorne, hangs in the drawing room of Glamis Castle on the far right. On 9 May 1728, following the funeral of the daughter of Patrick Carnegy of Lour in Forfar, the 6th Earl was accidentally killed by his cousin, James Carnegy of Finhaven while attempting to intervene in a physical altercation. Earlier in the day, John Lyon of Brigton had behaved "rudely" toward Finhaven's sister, Lady Margaret Auchterhouse.

After leaving the house, Brigton verbally harassed Finhaven and physically pushed him into a street kennel (mire). Enraged by the insult, Finhaven drew his sword to retaliate against Brigton, but accidentally ran through the 6th Earl, who had stepped between the two men to pacify the situation.

As recorded by the minister of Forfar, in subsequent trial records, Finhaven expressed "deep remorse" while imprisoned at the Forfar Tolbooth over the loss of his cousin. Defended by Robert Dundas of Arniston, the Elder, the trial resulted in a "Not Guilty" verdict. This precedent-setting case transformed Scots law by firmly establishing the right of Scottish juries to judge the entire case—including intent—rather than just the physical facts of an incident.

=== Other traditions ===
According to the official website for Glamis Castle, in 1034, Malcolm II was mortally wounded in a nearby battle and taken to a Royal Hunting Lodge, which sat at the site of the present castle, where he died.

== Description ==
The towers in front of the castle each measure 7 metres (23 ft) in diameter and are about 4 metres (13 ft) high, each having a modern parapet. The walls are 1 metre (3 ft 3 in) thick.

There is a small chapel within the castle with seating for 46 people. The story given to visitors by castle tour guides states that one seat in the chapel is always reserved for the "White Lady" (supposedly a ghost which inhabits the castle), thought to be Janet Douglas, Lady Glamis. According to the guides, the chapel is still used regularly for family functions, but no one is allowed to sit in that seat.

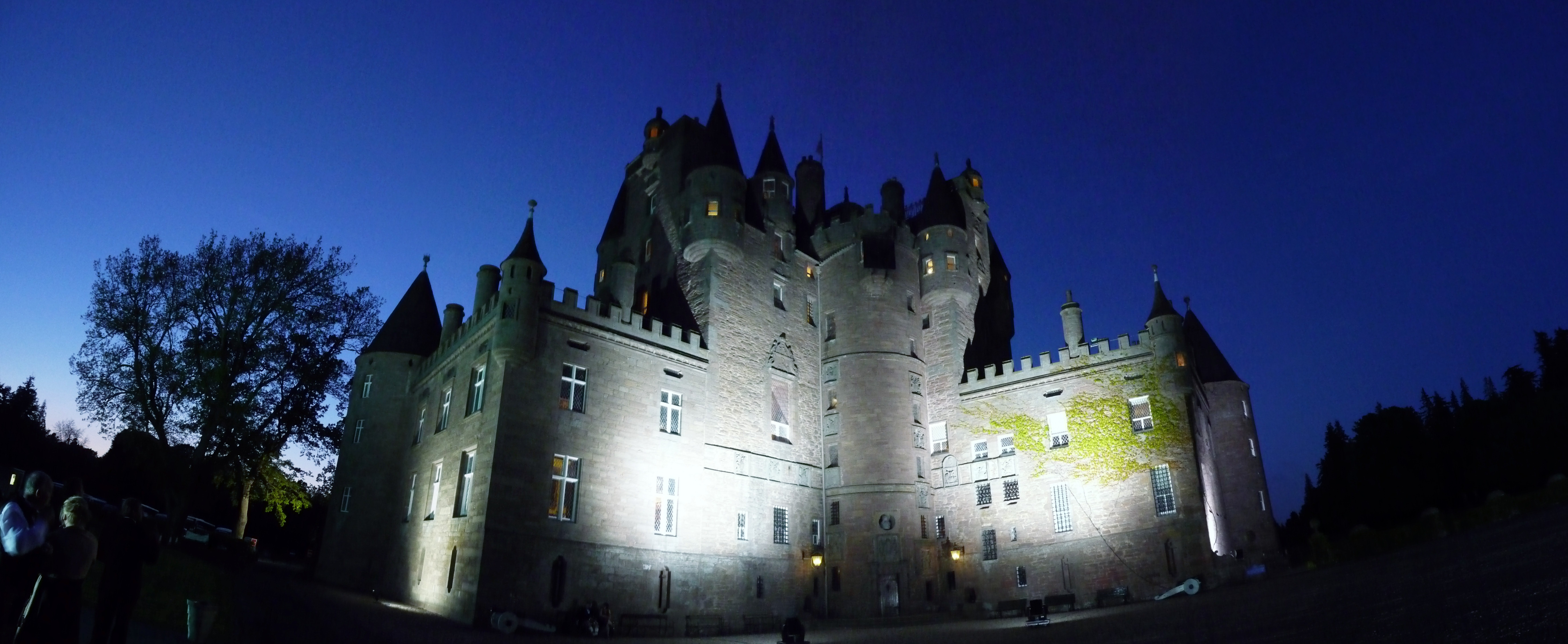
Glamis Castle on 30 May 2009

== Archives ==
The clock tower houses the castle's archives which include a wide range of historical material relating to the castle and the Bowes and Lyon families. These include a papal bull and the memoirs of Mary Eleanor Bowes. The Glamis archives have a close connection with the archives at the University of Dundee, and researchers who wish to consult material held in the Glamis Castle Archive do so in the search room at the university.

== In popular culture ==
In the British children's television series Thomas & Friends, Lord Callan's castle is based on Glamis Castle.

The cover design and story of the 1982 Yoko Tsuno album La Proie et l'ombre, by Roger Leloup, prominently features the fictional "Loch Castle", which is drawn as being near-identical to Glamis Castle.

In Star Trek The Next Generation, season 7 episode 14, "Sub Rosa", Glamis Castle is mentioned by the planet's Governor.

== See also ==
- List of places in Angus
