= Elizabeth Stanhope, Countess of Chesterfield =

Irish countess (1640–1665

Elizabeth Stanhope
- Countess of Chesterfield
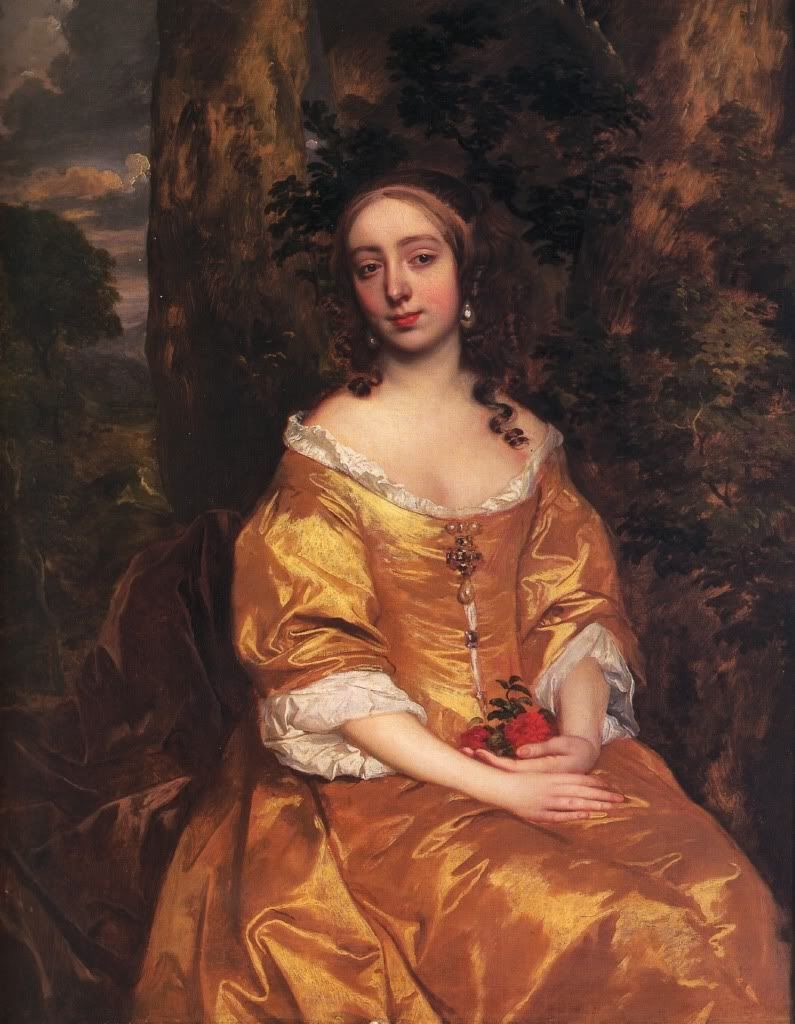
- Born: Elizabeth Butler; 29 June 1640
- Died: July 1665 (aged 25)
- Spouse: Philip Stanhope, 2nd Earl of Chesterfield
- Issue: Elizabeth
- Father: James Butler, 1st Duke of Ormond
- Mother: Elizabeth Preston

Elizabeth Stanhope, Countess of Chesterfield (née Butler; 1640–1665) was an Irish-born beauty. She was a courtier after the Restoration at the court of Charles II of England at Whitehall. She was the second wife of Philip Stanhope, 2nd Earl of Chesterfield.

== Birth and origins ==
Elizabeth was born on 29 June 1640 at Kilkenny Castle, Ireland, the eldest daughter of James Butler and Elizabeth Preston. Her father was Earl of Ormond at the time, but would become marquess and finally duke of Ormond. Her father's family, the Butler dynasty, was Old English and descended from Theobald Walter, who had been appointed Chief Butler of Ireland by King Henry II in 1177.

Her mother was the only child of Richard Preston, 1st Earl of Desmond and a rich heiress. Her parents married on Christmas 1629. They had 10 children, but five died in childhood.

Family tree

Elizabeth Stanhope (née Butler) with her husband, her parents, and other selected relatives, including the other 2 wives of her husband as he married three times. (Note: This family tree is partly derived from the condensed Butler family tree pictured in Dunboyne. Also see the daughter mentioned in the text.)

Richard; Preston; 1st Earl; Desmond d. 1628)	Elizabeth; Butler c. 1585 – 1628	Thomas; Viscount; Thurles d. 1619 d.v.p.*
Elizabeth; Preston; 1615–1684	James; 1st Duke; 1610–1688	Richard of Kilcash; 1615–1701
Thomas; 6th Earl; Ossory; 1633–1680 d.v.p.*	Anne; Percy; 1633–1654	Philip; Stanhope; 2nd Earl of Chesterfield; 1634–1714	Elizabeth; Stanhope; 1640–1665
James; 2nd Duke; Ormond; 1665–1745	Philip; 3rd Earl; 1673–1726	Elizabeth; Dormer d. 1677	John Lyon; 4th Earl; Strathmore; 1663–1712	Elizabeth; Stanhope c. 1663 – 1723
John Lyon; 5th Earl; Strathmore; 1696–1715

Legend

XXX	Elizabeth; Stanhope	XXX	Dukes of Ormond	XXX	Earls of Chesterfield	XXX	Earls of Strathmore

*d.v.p. = predeceased his father (decessit vita patris).
Philip's three wives: 1st left, 2nd right and 3rd below.

== Marriage and child ==
Elizabeth married Philip Stanhope, Earl of Chesterfield, as his second wife, some time before 25 September 1660. He was one of the lovers of the notorious Barbara Villiers, mistress of King Charles II of England. There were many at court who believed Barbara's first child, Anne bore a strong resemblance to Chesterfield. His first wife was Lady Anne Percy, daughter of Algernon Percy, 10th Earl of Northumberland; she had died on 29 November 1654 with no surviving children.

Philip and Elizabeth had one daughter, Lady Elizabeth Stanhope, later Countess of Strathmore, although the child's paternity was in doubt.

According to Samuel Pepys, theirs was a marriage of convenience, but Chesterfield, despite his own past conduct with Barbara Villiers, became jealous when rumours spread that his wife was having affairs with both James Hamilton and James, Duke of York, with whom she is said to have been caught in flagrante delicto. On the other hand, he describes Elizabeth as "a virtuous lady".

In the Memoirs of Count Gramont it is claimed that King Charles II of England told Gramont that his brother (the Duke of York) was in love with Lady Chesterfield. He also says of Lady Chesterfield that, "she had a most exquisite shape, though she was not very tall: her complexion was extremely fair, with all the expressive charms of a brunette: she had large blue eyes, very tempting and alluring: her manners were engaging: her wit lively and amusing; but her heart, ever open to tender sentiments, was neither scrupulous in point of constancy, nor nice in point of sincerity."

In May 1663, the couple went to live at Bretby in Derbyshire. It was around this time that their daughter, Elizabeth was born.

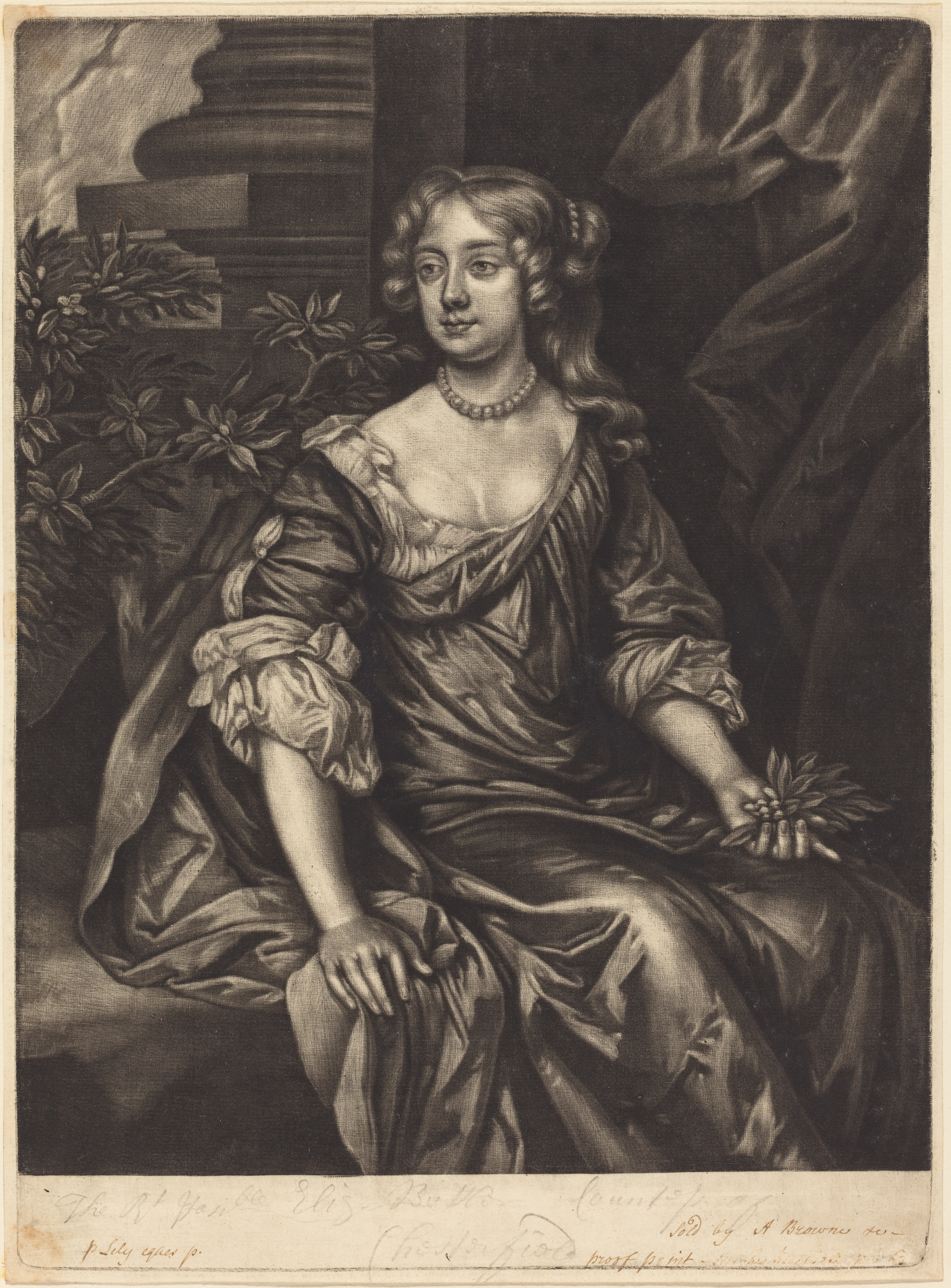
Lady Chesterfield

== Death and legacy ==
Lady Chesterfield died in July 1665 shortly after her 25th birthday and was buried on 18 July 1665 at Wellingborough, Northamptonshire. Engravings after her portrait by Sir Peter Lely are held by the National Portrait Gallery.

Her daughter, Elizabeth (May 1663 – 24 April 1723), who was a child of two years at the time of her mother's death, married John Lyon, 4th Earl of Strathmore and Kinghorne in 1691; the couple had 10 children. Elizabeth Bowes-Lyon, Queen consort of George VI of the United Kingdom was one of her many descendants.

Her husband married as his third wife Elizabeth Dormer, who gave him a son who succeeded as the third earl of Chesterfield.

== Notes and references ==
=== Sources ===
- Airy, Osmund (1886). "Butler, James, twelfth Earl and first Duke of Ormonde (1610–1688)". In Lee, Sidney (ed.). Dictionary of National Biography. Vol. VIII. New York: MacMillan and Co. pp. 52–60. OCLC 8544105.
- Ashley, Maurice (1977). James II. London: J.M. Dent & Sons. ISBN 0-460-12021-2.
- Cokayne, George Edward (1913). Gibbs, Vicary (ed.). The complete peerage of England, Scotland, Ireland, Great Britain and the United Kingdom, extant, extinct, or dormant. Vol. III (2nd ed.). London: St Catherine Press. OCLC 228661424. – Canonteign to Cutts (for Chesterfield)
- Debrett, John (1828). Peerage of the United Kingdom of Great Britain and Ireland. Vol. II (17th ed.). London: F. C. and J. Rivington. OCLC 54499602. – Scotland and Ireland
- Dunboyne, Patrick Theobald Tower Butler, Baron (1968). Butler Family History (2nd ed.). Kilkenny: Rothe House.
- Hamilton, Anthony (1888). Memoirs of Count Grammont. Translated by Walpole, Horace. Philadelphia: Gebbie & Co. OCLC 1048777116.
- Pepys, Samuel (1893). Wheatley, Henry Benjamin (ed.). The Diary of Samuel Pepys. Vol. II. London: George Bell and Sons. OCLC 503692830. – 1 April 1661 to 31 December 1662
- Perceval-Maxwell, Michael (2004). "Butler [née Preston] Elizabeth, duchess of Ormond and suo jure Lady Dingwall (1615–1684)". In Matthew, Henry Colin Gray.; Harrison, Brian (eds.). Oxford Dictionary of National Biography. Vol. 9. New York: Oxford University Press. pp. 130–131. ISBN 0-19-861359-8.
