= Susanna Lyon, Countess of Strathmore and Kinghorne =

Scottish noble

Susanna Lyon, Countess of Strathmore and Kinghorne (née Cochrane, c. 1709 – 23 June 1754) was a Scottish noble. She was the daughter of John Cochrane, 4th Earl of Dundonald, wife of Charles Lyon, 6th Earl of Strathmore and Kinghorne, and "Scotland's fairest daughter", to quote a chronicler of the time. She married Charles Lyon, 6th Earl of Strathmore and Kinghorne, but he was accidentally killed in an brawl at Forfar by James Carnegie of Finhaven in May 1728, leaving no heir. The resulting trial is famous for establishing in Scots law the "not guilty" verdict. Later, the Countess married her servant and was shunned by her family until she died in Paris, leaving a daughter who was left penniless by her rich relatives.

== Early life ==
Lady Susanna Cochrane was born the second daughter of John Cochrane, 4th Earl of Dundonald, with "all that rank and wealth and beauty could give were hers by birth". Her mother was Anne Murray, daughter of Charles Murray, 1st Earl of Dunmore. Her paternal grandmother was Lady Susanna Douglas-Hamilton, daughter of the Duke of Hamilton and granddaughter of the Duchess of Hamilton, who had had a claim to the Scottish throne (although this was dependent upon the failure of the House of Stewart). Her great-grandfather was the 1st Marquess of Atholl. On both sides, "she came from a line of fair women", many of whom it was said (including her mother) "had ranked among the most beautiful in all Scotland".

She had two sisters, Anne and Catherine, and all three were admired as great beauties. In 1723, Anne married James Hamilton, 5th Duke of Hamilton, becoming a duchess at sixteen, but died just a year later, giving birth to their only child, James Hamilton, 6th Duke of Hamilton. Catherine was not long out of the schoolroom before her hand was won by Alexander Stewart, 6th Earl of Galloway.

== Marriage to the Earl ==
Susanna, the loveliest of the "three Graces" - "Scotland's fairest daughter", to quote a chronicler of the time, had high-placed lovers by the score almost before she had graduated into long frocks. Charles Lyon, 6th Earl of Strathmore and Kinghorne, was accounted the "luckiest man north of the Tweed" when he won her for his bride.

Miss Ann Stuart, writing in August 1725, describes the marriage-dress of the beautiful Lady Susanna Cochrane, thus :—

"Lest you have not got a particular account of my Lord Strathmore's marriage, I will give you the best I can. He was the fondest lover ever I saw, and I believe as fond a husband. He has got a very fine woman, I am persuaded, and I think extream handsome; she has a mighty prity face, but indeed the siklyest pale one that can be; she is tall, well shaped, and has a graceful easie genteel air ... My Lady Strathmore had a blue and silver rich stuff gown and petecoat; a blue silk, trimmed to the pocket-holes with silver net; and a pale yellow, trimmed with two rows of open silver lace, about three nails deep each; a green satin, trimmed with close and open silver lace, which she had before her marriage. She was married in white; her fine Brussels lace she got from London, and she bought a great deal of lace at Edinburgh. She made no appearance after her marriage, except seeing the archers, for their coach was not come down from London, and they staid but a few days in town ..."

For a few years, the young Earl and his Countess were ideally happy. "I never thought", Lady Strathmore wrote to a friend, "that life could be so sweet. The days are all too short to crowd my happiness into."

== The death of the Earl ==
One day in May 1728, the young Earl went to Forfar to attend the funeral of the daughter of Patrick Carnegie of Lour, and among his fellow mourners were two men of his acquaintance his cousins, James Carnegie of Finhaven, and a Mr Lyon, of Brigton, the latter a distant relative of the Earl.

After the funeral the three men sat drinking together, as was the custom of the time, and then adjourned to a tavern in Forfar, where they continued until all three were in an advanced state of intoxication. From the tavern they went to call on a sister of Carnegie, where Mr Lyon became quarrelsome. It was with the utmost difficulty that Lord Strathmore induced his two companions to leave the house.

Mr. Lyon began to conduct himself more outrageously than before, now that the modified restraint of a lady's presence was removed. "with a rage", he pushed Carnegie into a deep ditch which ran beside the roadside, and from which Carnegie emerged covered with mud. "Such an insult could only be wiped out with blood"; and, drawing his sword, Carnegie stumbled mortally drunk at Lyon. The Earl, to avert a tragedy, imprudently threw himself between the two antagonists, and Carnegie's sword entered his body, passing clean through it, and 49 hours later the Earl died.

Thus, a drunken brawl, following a funeral, made a widow of the beautiful Countess.

James Carnegie of Finhaven, was brought to trial on a charge of murder; the jury required only to examine the facts of the case were intended to give a verdict only of "proven" or "not proven" but instead brought in a verdict of "not guilty" and from that trial onwards, it has been a recognised verdict in Scots Law.

== Scandal ==
The widowed Countess was barely twenty and richly endowed. Many a wooer "sought to console her with a new prospect of wedded happiness". But she refused them all and for seventeen years she lived, "a model of all that is beautiful in womanhood, captivating all hearts by her sweetness and graciousness, and by a beauty which sorrow only served to refine and make more lovely still".

In 1745, when still young, the Countess became involved in a scandal. Among the Countess's many servants was one George Forbes, who had been taken on as stable-boy by her late husband. He was her factor, who was Master of the Horse to Charles Edward Stuart, "the Young Chevalier".

One day it is said: the Countess summoned the groom to her presence, and, to his amazement and embarrassment, told him that she had long grown to love him, and that she asked nothing better of life than to become his wife. Overcome with surprise and confusion, Forbes protested: "But my lady, think of the difference between us. You are one of the greatest ladies in the land, and I am no better than the earth you tread on." "You must not say that", the Countess replied. "You are more to me than rank or riches. These I count as nothing, compared with the happiness you have it in your power to bestow."

In the face of such pleading, the groom/factor consented to a marriage despite the problems that such a marriage between two people of very different status would cause. On 2 April 1745, the Countess of Strathmore married the ex-stable-lad and peasant's son. His father was a gentleman who fell on hard times. The master of the horse was only commissioned by gentlemen. He was literate. The Countess was disowned by her noble relatives; her friends gave her the cold shoulder; and, unable to bear any longer the constant slights and her complete isolation, she went to the Continent.

She had given birth to a daughter in Holland, but the relationship foundered, and the Countess arranged a separation. The child was placed in a convent at Rouen. According to one source, the Countess "rambled aimlessly and miserably about the Continent" until nine years later she died in Paris. She became a Roman Catholic and died in 1754 in a convent at Charenton near Paris.

== Her disowned daughter ==
The Countess' rich relatives disowned her daughter, and the child grew up in the Rouen convent. Then, in 1761, a "rough seafaring man" called at the convent with a letter from her father demanding the return of his daughter to Leith. The girl (Susan Janet Emilia) went to the father she had never seen, who now lived with a new wife and family and was a livery-stable keeper at Leith.

Emily was not happy; It is said she was treated by her stepmother with coarseness and brutality. One morning, Emilia slipped stealthily away with all her few possessions. For days, it is said, this descendant of Scotland's nobles tramped through the country, sleeping in barns or craving the shelter of the humblest cottage, and, when her money was exhausted, even begging from door to door.

Finally, she came across a farmer who invited her to make her home with them. Eventually, Emily married the farmer's only son, and they had many children.

It was not until 15 February 1766 that the Countess' will was finally proven by her lowly born husband. But not until Emily's old age did a few of her great relatives condescend to acknowledge her existence. The Earls of Galloway and Dunmore, the Duke of Hamilton, and Mrs. Stewart Mackenzie combined to provide her with an annuity of £100.
