= Philip Stanhope, 2nd Earl of Chesterfield =

British nobleman (1634–1714)

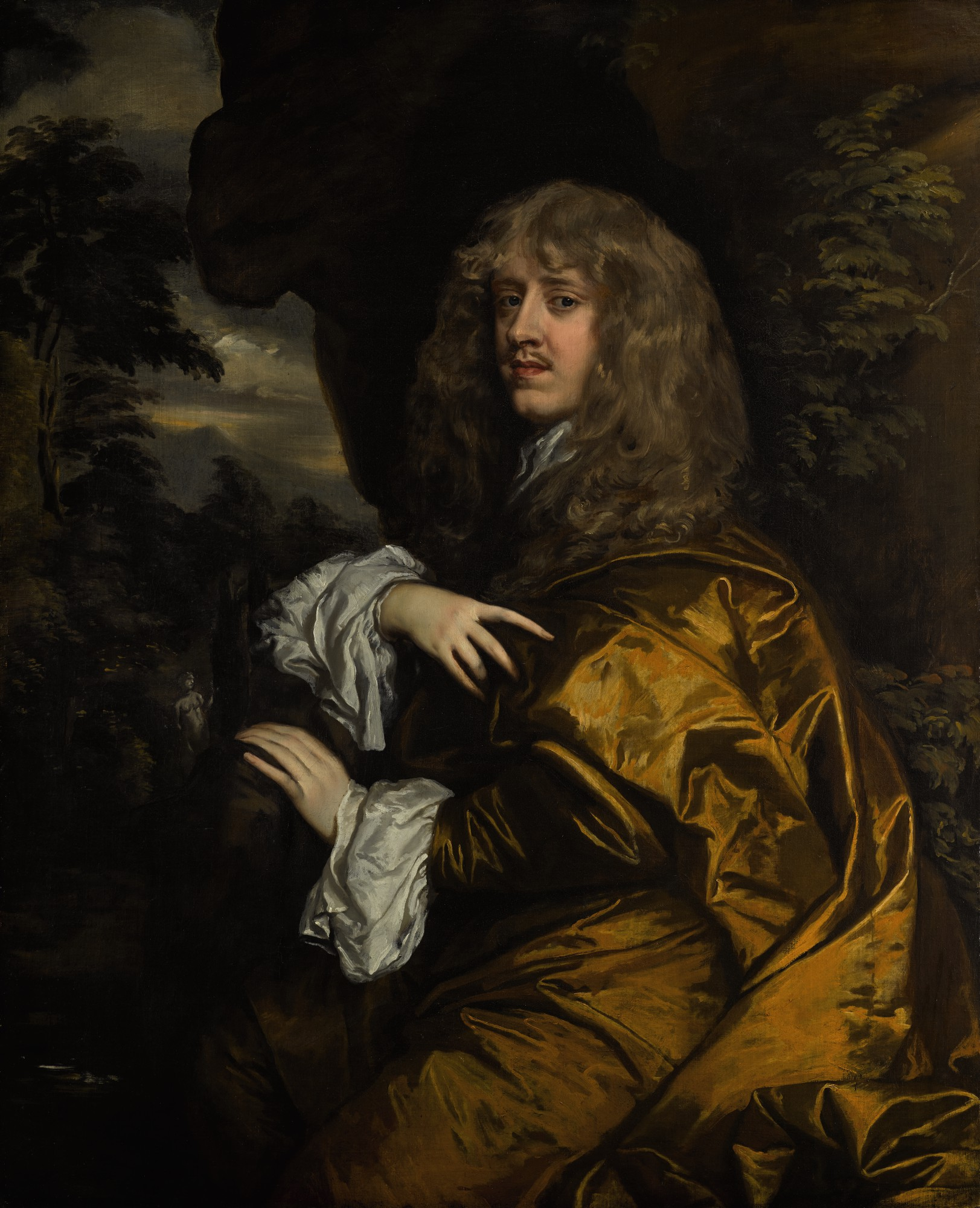
Portrait of Philip Stanhope, 2nd Earl of Chesterfield (by Peter Lely)

Philip Stanhope, 2nd Earl of Chesterfield PC FRS (1634 – 28 January 1714) was a peer in the peerage of England.

== Personal life ==
He was the son of Henry Stanhope, Lord Stanhope and his wife, Katherine Wotton. He inherited the title of Earl of Chesterfield on the death of his grandfather in 1656. He was educated by Poliander, Professor of Divinity at Leyden (1640) and at the Prince of Orange's College at Breda. In 1669 he was awarded the degree of Doctor of Civil Laws by the University of Oxford.

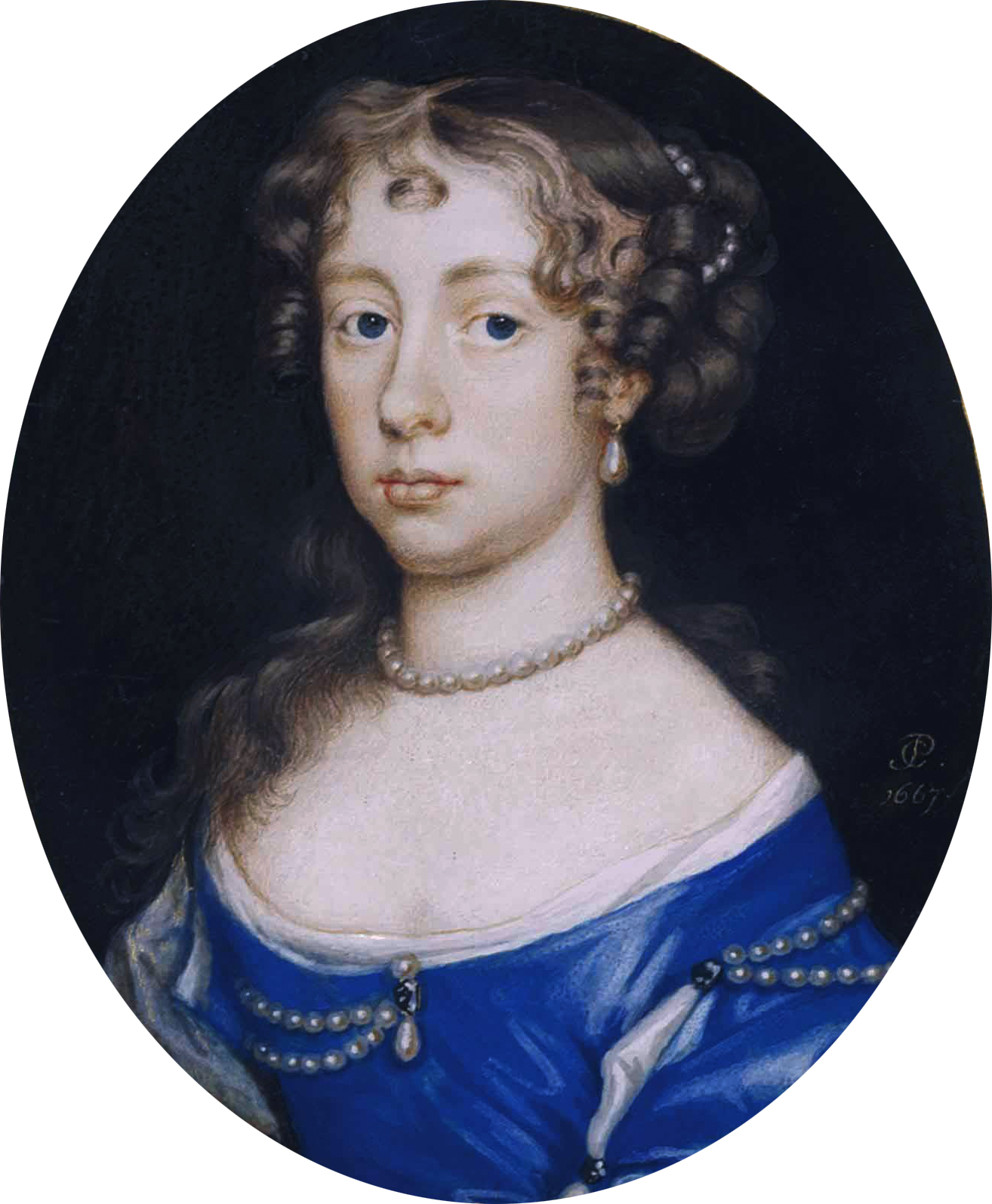
Elizabeth Dormer (Peter Cross, 1667)

His first marriage was to Lady Anne Percy, daughter of the Earl of Northumberland. Following her death, a marriage had been arranged between him and Mary, daughter of Anne and 3rd Lord Fairfax. Despite the fact the banns had been read twice, Mary jilted Chesterfield for the 2nd Duke of Buckingham with whom she had fallen in love. Chesterfield subsequently married Elizabeth Butler, daughter of James Butler, 1st Duke of Ormond and his wife, Elizabeth Preston. They had one daughter, Lady Elizabeth (from whom descends Queen Elizabeth II), but it is not certain that Chesterfield was the father. Elizabeth died in 1665, and he married a third time to the second daughter of Charles Dormer, 2nd Earl of Carnarvon, Lady Elizabeth Dormer, who finally provided him with two sons.

According to Samuel Pepys, Chesterfield was a ladies' lord, and had been one of the many lovers of Barbara Villiers, the most notorious mistress of King Charles II. His second wife, tired of his neglect, began flirting with the king's brother, the Duke of York, and also with James Hamilton.

He was imprisoned in the Tower of London for wounding Captain John Whalley in a duel (1658) and on suspicion of involvement in Sir George Booth's rising (1659). He also killed Francis Wolley in a duel on 17 January 1660, and fled to Holland. After having obtained pardon from Charles II, he returned to England.

== Career ==
He was Lord Chamberlain to Catherine of Braganza (1662–1665) and a member of her Council (1670). He was Colonel of a regiment of foot (1667, 1682), a Privy Councillor (1681) and the Warden of the royal forests south of Trent (1679). He was elected a Fellow of the Royal Society in November 1708. He died at his home in Middlesex, and was buried in Shelford, Nottinghamshire.

== See also ==
List of deserters from James II to William of Orange

Legal offices
Preceded by The Duke of Monmouth	Justice in Eyre south of the Trent; 1679–bef. 1686	Succeeded by The Earl of Huntingdon
Military offices
Preceded by The Earl of Mulgrave	Colonel of The Holland Regiment; 1682–1684	Succeeded by The Earl of Mulgrave
Peerage of England
Preceded by Philip Stanhope	Earl of Chesterfield; 1656–1714	Succeeded by Philip Stanhope
