= Patrick Lyon, 3rd Earl of Strathmore and Kinghorne =

Scottish peer and nobleman

The Right Honourable The Earl of Strathmore and Kinghorne
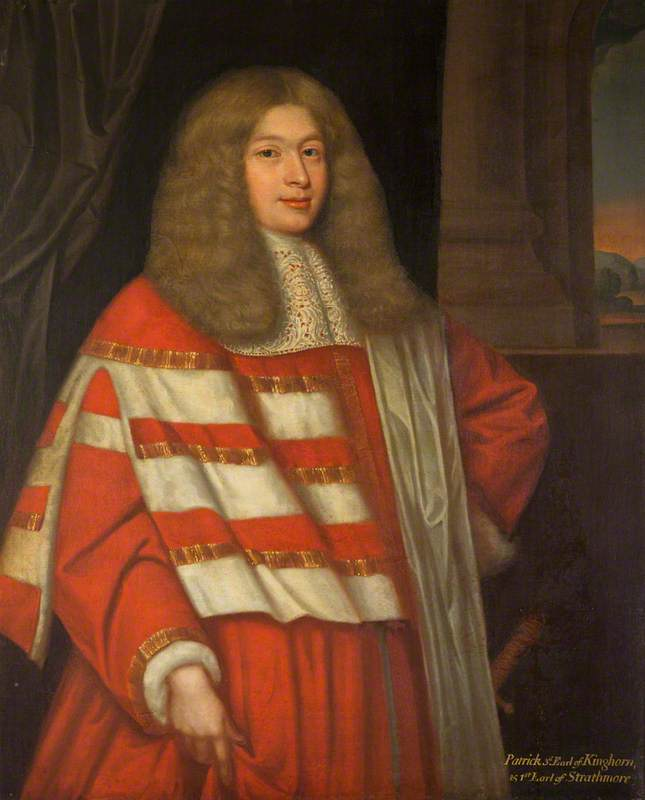
- Patrick Lyon, 3rd Earl of Strathmore and Kinghorne
- Born: 29 May 1643
- Died: 15 May 1695 (aged 51)
- Title: 3rd Earl of Strathmore and Kinghorne
- Spouse: Helen Middleton (m. 1662)
- Children: 8 (including John Lyon, 4th Earl of Strathmore and Kinghorne and Patrick Lyon)
- Parent(s): John Lyon, 2nd Earl of Kinghorne; Lady Elizabeth Maule

Patrick Lyon, 3rd Earl of Strathmore and Kinghorne (29 May 1643 – 15 May 1695) was a Scottish peer and nobleman. He was the son of John Lyon, 2nd Earl of Kinghorne and Lady Elizabeth Maule, daughter of Patrick Maule, 1st Earl of Panmure and Frances Stanhope. Patrick was the grandson of Patrick Lyon, 1st Earl of Kinghorne and Anne Murray.

== Life ==
On 12 May 1646, aged 2, Patrick inherited the titles of third Earl of Kinghorne and eleventh Lord Glamis from his father, as well as Glamis Castle and Castle Lyon (now Castle Huntly), which had been purchased by 1st Earl of Kinghorne in 1614. On 30 May 1672, he obtained a new charter, ratified in Parliament on 1 July 1677, giving an addition to his title, which was in future to be Earl of Strathmore and Kinghorne, Viscount Lyon, Lord Glammis, Tannadyce, Sidlaw, and Stradichtie, with the precedence of the former honour of Earl of Kinghorne.

== Family ==
Patrick Lyon married Helen Middleton, daughter of John Middleton, 1st Earl of Middleton, and Grizel Durham, on 23 August 1662. They had eight children:

1. John Lyon, 4th Earl of Strathmore and Kinghorne (8 May 1663 – 10 May 1712).
2. Lady Grizel Lyon (1665 – circa 1721) married David Ogilvy, 3rd Earl of Airlie, and had issue.
3. Lady Jean Lyon (1666–unknown), died young.
4. Lady Elizabeth Lyon (1666–before 1672), died young.
5. Patrick Lyon m Margaret Carnegie of Finhaven (1669–1715)
6. Lady Elizabeth Lyon (1672–1739), married Charles Gordon, 1st Earl of Aboyne, and had issue, married Patrick Kinnaird, 3rd Lord Kinnaird, had issue, married Capt. Alexander Grant, no issue.
7. Lady Adelaide Lyon (1676–1698).
8. Charles Lyon (1679–1692), died young.

Peerage of Scotland
Preceded by John Lyon (as Earl of Kinghorne)	Earl of Strathmore and Kinghorne; 1646–1695	Succeeded by John Lyon
