= Eliza Stephens =

English governess (1757–1815)

Eliza Stephens (née Anna Elizabeth Planta; 6 February 1757 – 25 December 1815) (Note: Dates given throughout the article are as they appear in sources. Britain used the Gregorian calendar from September 1752. Russia continued to use the Julian calendar until February 1918.) was an English governess. She worked for the English aristocrat Mary Eleanor Bowes as a governess and companion and was instrumental in helping Andrew Robinson Stoney become Bowes's second husband. It is possible she had an affair with Stoney and carried his child when she married Reverend Henry Stephens, tutor to the Bowes children, shortly after meeting him. Eliza and Henry received a £1,000 payment and a £200 annuity after the Stoney–Bowes marriage. Henry became a curate in Ponteland, and Eliza assisted Stoney in keeping Bowes's daughter Mary from seeing her until Bowes won a divorce in 1789.

After Henry's death around 1790, Eliza's brother Joseph Planta helped her find employment as a governess in Russia. She worked for Countess Catherine Shuvalova, a lady-in-waiting to the empress Catherine the Great. Stephens's daughter Elizabeth married Mikhail Speransky, who would become an advisor to Tsar Alexander I of Russia, in 1798. Elizabeth died in 1799 soon after giving birth to her daughter, Elisabeth Bagréeff-Speransky. Stephens lived with Bagréeff-Speransky and other family in various places in the Russian Empire until 1815, when she died in Kiev.

== Early life and family ==
Anna Elizabeth "Eliza" Planta was born on 6 February 1757 (baptised on 18 February), to Andrew Planta, pastor of the German Reformed congregation at the Savoy Chapel in London, and his wife Margarete Scartazzini de Bolgiani. Her Swiss-born father had previously served as pastor of the Italian-speaking Reformed congregation in Castasegna, Switzerland. He was also an educator of Prince Alexander at the Ansbach court of Charles William Frederick, Margrave of Brandenburg-Ansbach, before coming to London in 1752. He worked as an assistant librarian at the British Museum from 1758 and was elected a Fellow of the Royal Society in 1770. Several of Eliza's sisters worked as governesses and educators for noble families. Her older sister Elizabeth became governess of eight-year-old Mary Eleanor Bowes in 1757. Another sister, Frederica, was governess and English teacher of the daughters of George III and Queen Charlotte. After Frederica's early death, her sister Margaret took over her positions. Their only brother, Joseph Planta, served as principal librarian at the British Museum.

The Plantas were multilingual. At home, they spoke Romansh. Frederica was known to know seven languages including Latin and Greek, Joseph was known to speak Romansh, English, French, German, and Italian in his youth and later also not just Latin, Greek and Hebrew, but also Dutch and Spanish and some medieval languages. Eliza herself was fluent at least in English, French and Italian. They likely also had some musical education, and Eliza is known to have played the harpsichord. During Leopold Mozart's 1765 journey to London with his family including his son Wolfgang Amadeus Mozart, the Mozart family was entertained by Andrew Planta at Montagu House. Leopold Mozart noted in his travel diary that he had met Planta and his family.

== Employment by Mary Eleanor Bowes ==
Mary Eleanor Bowes was the only child of the wealthy coal owner and politician George Bowes and his second wife, Mary Gilbert. Mary Eleanor was widely educated, reading voraciously in several languages. In 1757, Eliza's father, Andrew Planta, was engaged as Mary Eleanor's French teacher, and Elizabeth Planta, Eliza's elder sister, was employed as her governess. After the death of George Bowes in 1760, Mary Eleanor became heiress of a vast fortune. Her mother left London and returned to her home in St Paul's Walden Bury, and the upbringing of Mary Eleanor was left to her aunt Jane Bowes, her governess Elizabeth Planta, and various teachers. In 1767, Mary Eleanor married John Lyon, the 9th Earl of Strathmore and Kinghorne, who took her last name. Elizabeth Planta became a lady's companion to Mary Eleanor's mother Mary Bowes, returning to Mary Eleanor's employ as governess of her children in 1774.

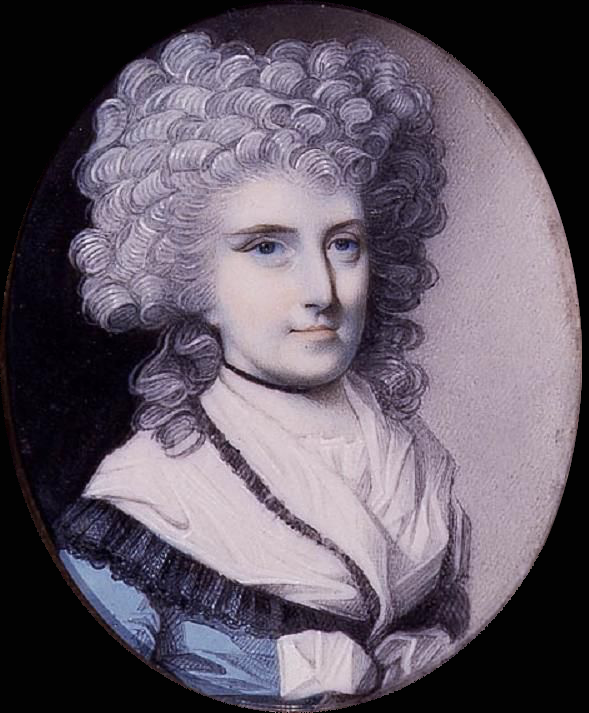
Mary Eleanor Bowes

In January 1776, John Bowes went on a journey to Portugal. Soon after his departure, Mary Eleanor started an affair with George Gray, a Calcutta-born Scottish entrepreneur. John did not reach his destination and died of tuberculosis in March 1776. By April, Mary Eleanor was pregnant with Gray's child. She induced a miscarriage using an abortifacient that she later described as a "black inky kind of medicine" and aborted two further pregnancies during 1776. Besides her lover, Bowes also had a circle of friends regularly visiting at her Grosvenor Square house (called the "Temple of Folly" by the surgeon Jesse Foot) that included Joseph Planta and the botanist Daniel Solander, who had accompanied Joseph Banks on the first voyage of James Cook. Other members of this circle were James Matra, who was another companion of Cook, and his brother, Perkins Magra, a captain in the British Army. (Note: According to Ralph Arnold's biography of Bowes, Eliza Planta's soon-to-be husband Henry Stephens and his brother George also were part of this group at the time; in Wendy Moore's biography of Bowes, they do not enter the picture before November 1776.)

In July 1776, Bowes dismissed Elizabeth Planta from service with a generous payment of £2,000 (equivalent to £280,000 in 2025), possibly to stop her from discussing the affair and the resulting pregnancies and abortions with Bowes's mother or with the Lyon family. (Note: According to Moore, this payment of £2,000 was an "irresistible payoff" constituting "sufficient funds to keep her comfortable for life.") Elizabeth's younger sister Eliza Planta was then hired as the new governess for the children of Mary Eleanor Bowes, and she quickly became an important and trusted companion to her mistress. When Bowes and Gray became formally engaged in St Paul's Cathedral in August or September 1776, Planta served as one of the witnesses.

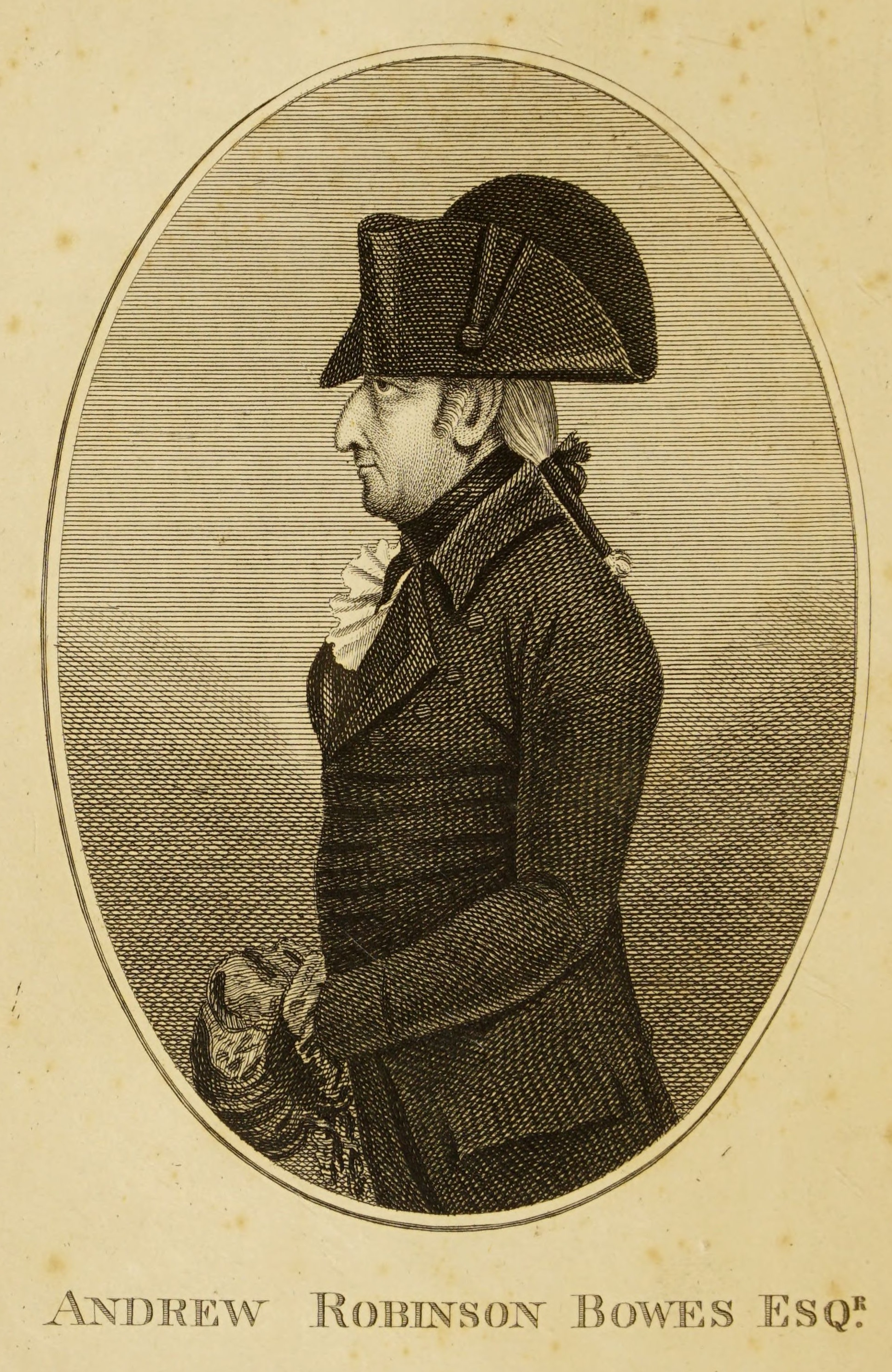
Portrait of Andrew Robinson Stoney, who took his wife's surname in 1777.

In the second half of 1776, Andrew Robinson Stoney arrived in London. Stoney was a Protestant from a prosperous English family settled in Ireland and was an officer in the British Army. His first wife had died in March 1776, and Stoney had inherited £5,000 and taken control of her estate in County Durham. Stoney's life story was later adapted by William Makepeace Thackeray as that of the anti-hero in The Luck of Barry Lyndon. He was later described as a "schemer" who had come to London with the purpose to seduce and marry the wealthy Bowes. Stoney was probably introduced to Bowes's social circle by his friend, Perkins Magra. He soon turned Planta into an ally, and according to Bowes's biographer Wendy Moore, he may also have been Planta's lover. Planta was expected to inform Stoney of Bowes's interests and undertakings, to uncover her weaknesses and generally further his cause, in order to make Bowes end her relationship with Gray. One of Stoney's ploys included a visit to a fortune-teller that Planta proposed to Bowes, who reacted with enthusiasm. According to Jesse Foot, who was Stoney's surgeon, friend, and later his biographer, the fortune-teller had been "tutored to his wishes". Searching for advice about her own romantic situation, Bowes pretended to be a grocer's widow and asked whether she "should marry a brewer or a sugar-boiler". The fortune-teller's response to this question has not been recorded, but likely indicated the advantages of Stoney over Gray.

== Marriage to Henry Stephens ==
In November 1776, Bowes hired Reverend Henry Stephens as tutor for her children. He was introduced to her by Magra and Matra; according to Bowes's biographer Wendy Moore, probably on the initiative of Stoney who was keen to further his own interests. Stephens soon after allied himself with Stoney. He was a widower who had debts of a few hundred pounds. (Note: According to Parker, the debts amounted to £7,000.) Planta and Stephens married very quickly and eloped ten days after their first meeting, infuriating the Planta family. (Note: In her Confessions, a book Bowes was likely forced to write by Stoney, she later described her part in the Stephens wedding as her "revenge ... on the Planta family.") They were married in Scotland in November or December 1776, with the wedding announced in the Monthly Miscellany in December 1776. (Note: The biography of Mary Eleanor Bowes by Derek Parker contains a slightly different timeline, and claims that the wedding took place around August 1776.) According to Moore, Eliza was pregnant at the time of the wedding, and Bowes encouraged her to use an abortifacient. Moore suggests the father of the child was Stoney. It is unclear whether Henry Stephens was aware of his wife's pregnancy at the time. (Note: Eliza herself later denied claims that advertisements had been placed in order to find a husband for her; Moore takes this as another indication for her pregnancy.)

Starting in December 1776, The Morning Post published several letters attacking Bowes's morals and her libertine lifestyle. On 13 January 1777, Stoney duelled with the newspaper's editor Henry Bate in defence of Bowes's honour and was seemingly mortally wounded. He was pronounced to have only a few days left to live, and married Bowes on 17 January 1777. The same evening, she made a present of £1,000 to Eliza. This money may have been intended to cover Henry Stephens's debts, as recompense for the position as a minor canon he had given up when entering the household, or as hush money so Henry and Eliza would keep quiet about Bowes's own pregnancy. Very soon after, Stoney made a full recovery; the letters, the duel and the medical opinions on his expected death had all been an elaborate fabrication. When Stoney went to Newcastle in February 1777 with his new wife in order to contest a parliamentary by-election for the Newcastle constituency, Bowes's four younger children stayed behind in London with Henry Stephens, while Eliza accompanied the couple, staying with them at Gibside. A witness later claimed to have seen Stoney leave Eliza's bedroom at 5 o'clock one morning after the election, suggesting their affair was still ongoing. The Stephenses continued to look after the Bowes children until April 1777, when they left the family's employment and departed quickly. After spending ten days in France, Henry and Eliza left for Stoney's estate at Colepike Hall near Lanchester, County Durham. According to Moore, Eliza's child was born there later in 1777. Bowes later wrote in her Confessions, "had I known [Mrs. Stephens] as I do now, I would ... have [e]ntreated you to turn her out of the house directly; ... and had I known Mr. Stephens, ... I should have thought only with horror of his ever being near my sons, or in my house." It is not quite known what caused Bowes to write in such terms about her previously intimate friends; it is possible that this was Stoney's doing, but he and the Stephenses later reconciled their differences. From 1778, Eliza Stephens received an annuity of £200 from the Stoney-Bowes family.

Eliza and Henry Stephens had five known children: Jane Elizabeth (christened November 1778), Francis William (christened April 1780), Henry Planta (christened July 1781 – November 1787), Marianne Marg[are]t (christened November 1784), and George Andrew Planta (christened June 1786 – June 1786). Stoney became increasingly abusive and controlling of his wife, who esacaped from him in 1785. Stoney then hid Bowes's daughter Mary from her mother by sending her to live with Eliza Stephens. By the time of the trial between Stoney and Bowes in February 1789, Henry Stephens had assumed the post of curate at Ponteland, Northumberland. Eliza and Henry both were witnesses for Stoney and against Bowes in this trial, accusing her of adultery with her footman. Bowes won a divorce in March 1789. Afterwards, Eliza attempted to reconcile with Bowes and informed her about her daughter Mary's location and helped to remove her from Stoney's influence. Henry Stephens died in 1789 or 1790.

== Governess for Russian nobility ==
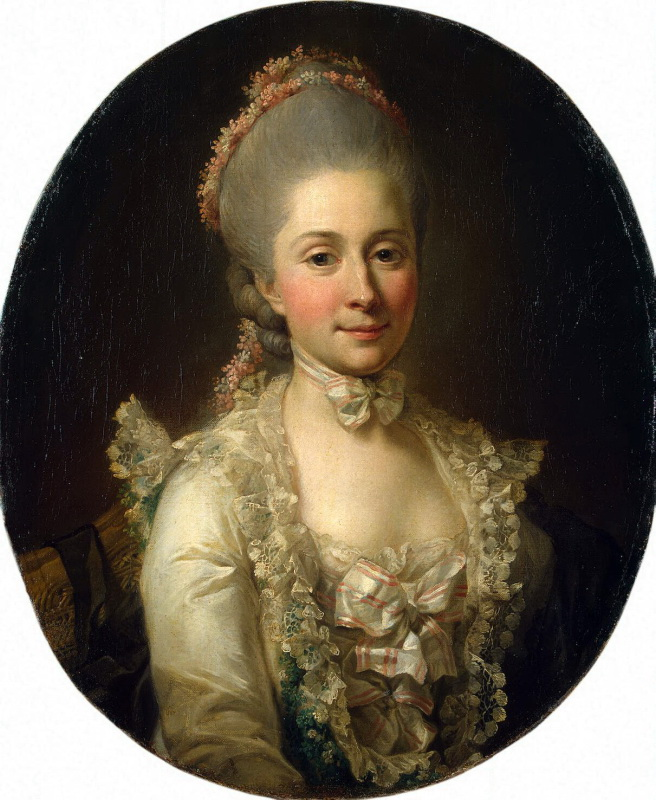
Catherine Shuvalova

Within six months of Henry's death, Stephens left without her children for Saint Petersburg, Russia, in spite of the fact that she had no employment offers. (Note: Joseph Planta wrote (some sources date the letter to 1789 and others to 1790) that his sister, who likely married in December 1776, was married for twelve years before becoming widowed six months previously.) Her brother Joseph wrote to his friend Andrew Samborski, who was living there after having served for many years as chaplain of the Russian Orthodox Church in London. Listing her qualifications, he noted that Stephens was fluent in English, French, and Italian; was a talented vocalist; played the harpsichord; and was skilled in needlework. He suggested that because of her skill, taste, and temperament, she was suitable for a post in the Smolny Institute of Noble Maidens, a finishing school for aristocratic girls. Samborski was able to find Stephens a position with Countess Catherine Shuvalova, who was the widow of Andrey Shuvalov, a writer who held several governmental posts in the Russian royal court. Shuvalova was a powerful figure in the court of the Russian Empire and a lady-in-waiting to the empress Catherine the Great. Her charge was Shuvalova's youngest daughter, Alexandra (1775–1847). After several months of satisfactory service, Shuvalova allowed Stephens to bring her children – Elizabeth, Francis, and Marianne – and their nurse, Miss Joyce, to Saint Petersburg. The children lived with Miss Joyce, even after Joyce's marriage, until Samborski placed Elizabeth and Marianne in a private boarding school. Francis, who was intellectually disabled, also learned to read.

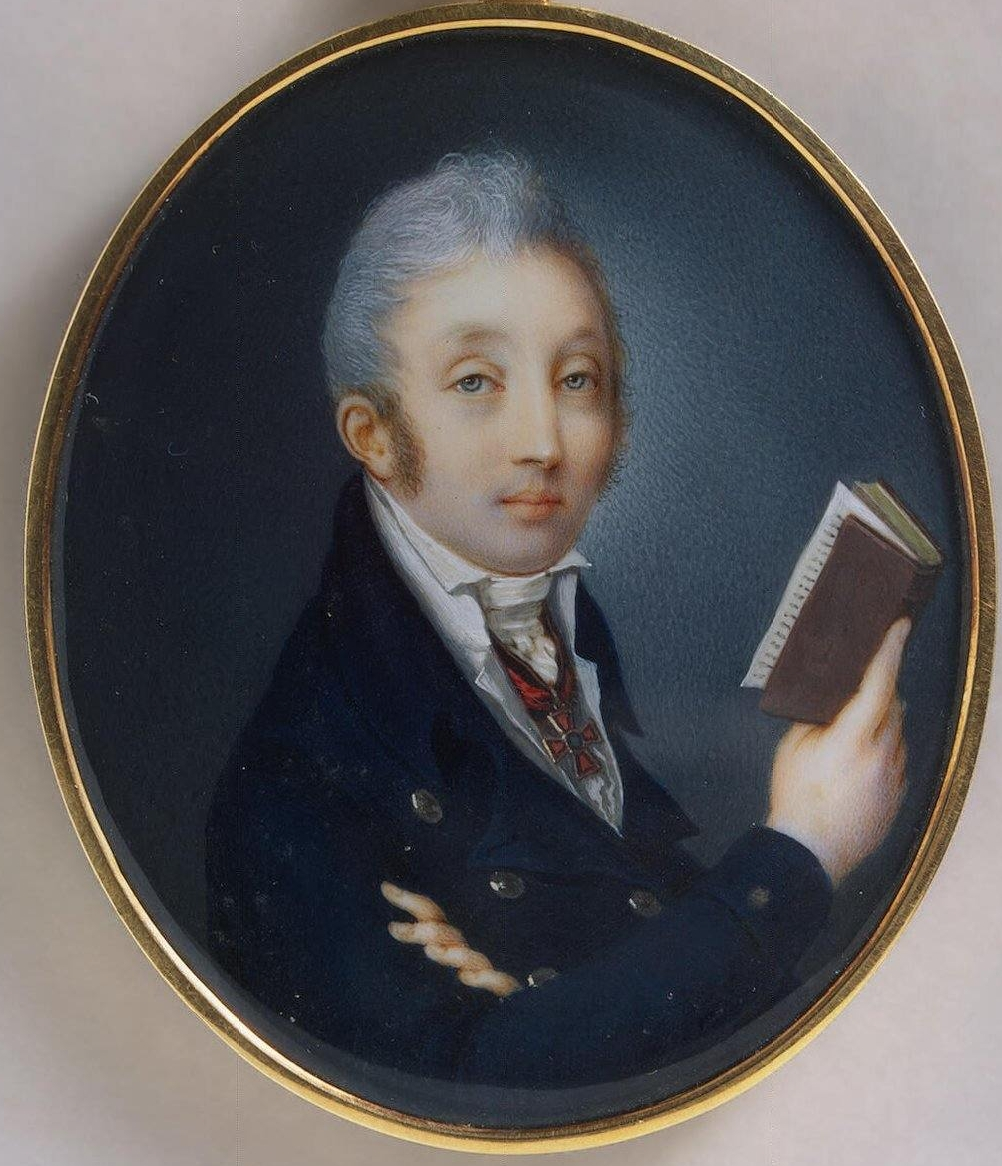
Mikhail Speransky

According to Baron Modest Andreyevich Korff, a government minister with close ties to the family, Stephens was known as Elisaveta Andreevna Stephens (Russian: Елисавета Андреевна Стивенсъ) in Russia and initially her surname was spelled Stevens. (Note: More modern sources in Russian refer to her as Elizaveta Andreevna Stephens (Russian: Елизавета Андреевна Стивенс) or Elizabeth Andreevna Stephens (Russian: Элизабет Андреевна Стивенс). There is often confusion in sources which name the daughter with the same maiden name as the mother. For example, Joseph de Maistre clarifies that the Elizaveta Andreevna referred to in the letter as Elizabeth Stevens is "Сперанская Елизавета Андреевна (ок. 1778—1799) — урожденная Элизабет Стивенс. Жена М. М. Сперанского (с. 1798) [Elizaveta Andreevna Speranskaya (c. 1778–1799) — born Elizabeth Stevens. Wife of MM Speransky (since 1798)]". However, as the daughter's father was Henry (Russian: Генри), the patronymic name would have been based upon his name.) The family became part of the English-speaking colony living in Saint Petersburg, which included Samborski and his wife, the Shuvalov's family physician Georg Weikard and his wife, Maria, daughter of the banker, Karl Ludwig Amburger. Stephens went abroad with Shuvalova in 1792 to bring back Louise and Frederica, Princesses of Baden, as potential brides for the future Alexander I. In 1797, Alexandra married Franz Joseph, Prince of Dietrichstein, and Stephens's daughter Elizabeth met Mikhail Speransky while she was visiting at the summer cottage of Samborski. Speransky was a graduate of the Alexander Nevsky Seminary and had that year entered the civil service. Stephens continued in the employ of Alexandra, who had her only child Joseph Franz the following April. Elizabeth and Speransky married at the end of 1798 and shortly after their wedding, Stephens moved to Vienna with the Dietrichstein family and her own children, Francis and Marianne.

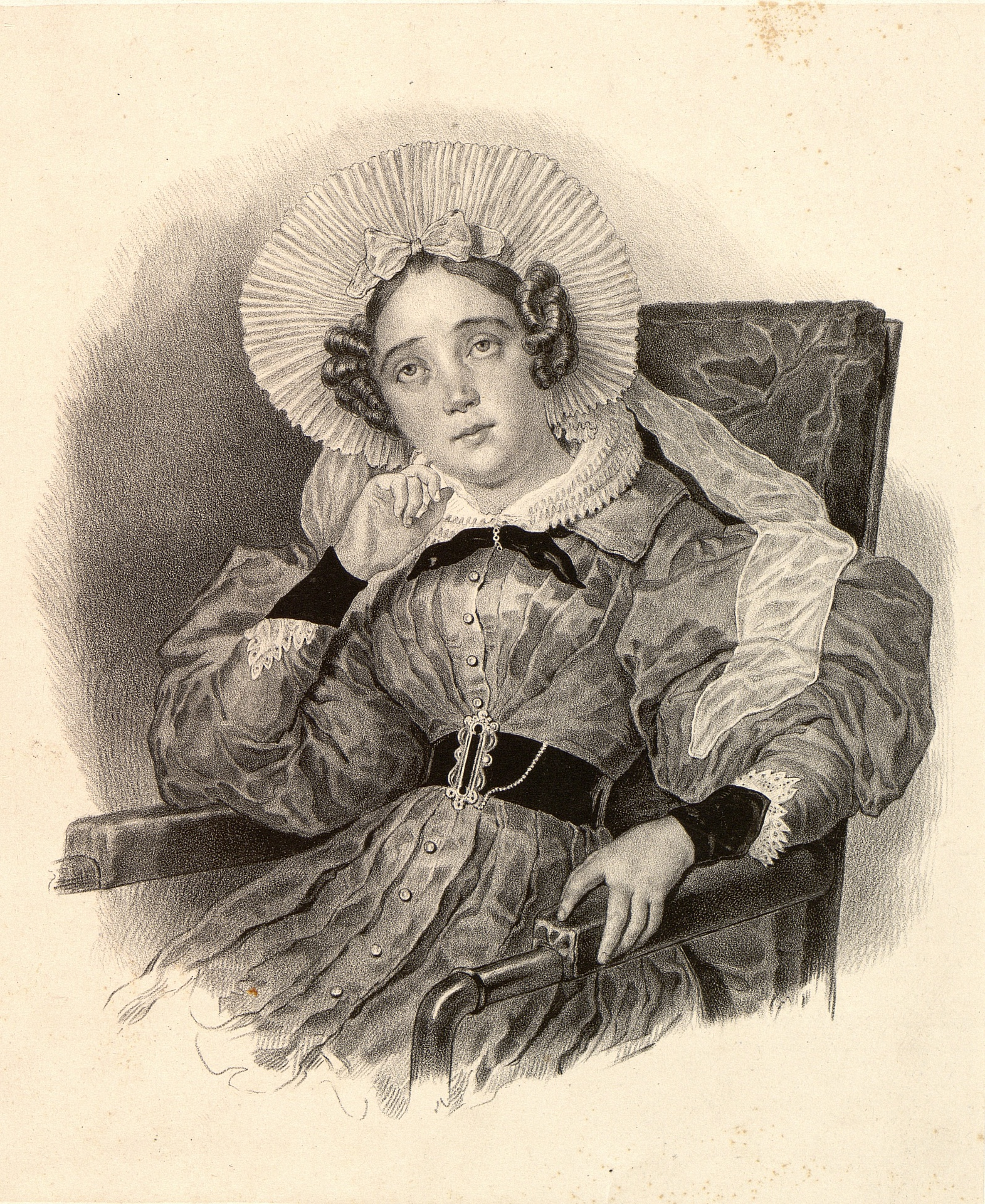
Elizaveta Mikhailovna Speranskaya

In 1799, Stephens's daughter, Elizabeth, gave birth to her only child, Elizaveta Mikhailovna Speranskaya, but died two months later. At the time of his wife's death, Speransky was at work and her mother was still in Austria. She was attended by Maria Weikard. Distraught over his wife's death, Speransky buried himself in his work. He sent his daughter to live with Mrs. Scott, who had formerly served as a nurse for Stephens, and who lived along the Vyborgskaya Embankment, opposite Aptekarsky Island. In 1801, Stephens left Dietrichstein's employ and moved into Speransky's house to care for Speranskaya. The following year, when her daughter Marianne married Konstantin Zlobin, Stephens's family, including her granddaughter, all moved into the home of Marianne's father-in-law, Vasily Zlobin. The young couple were not well suited and within six months were having marital problems. Konstantin was not in good health and had a gloomy disposition; whereas, Marianne was lively and vivacious and enjoyed socializing. Vasily, who was fond of Marianne, suggested that the Stephens family take a trip to Baldone (now in Latvia) to enjoy the sulfur water spa there. When he discovered they were returning in the autumn, Konstantin abandoned his wife and left his family home. For more than a year, Vasily tried in vain to negotiate a reconciliation. The Stephens family lived with him for approximately two years.

Speranskaya became ill with scarlet fever. Because her recovery left her in delicate health, doctors recommended that she live in a warmer climate. Speransky agreed to allow her to go to Kiev (present-day Ukraine) and Vasily bought a house there for Marianne and her family. During this time, Stephens's husband's sister, Marie, and brother-in-law, Joseph Ferrand, died in France. (Note: Korff gives the surname as "Fernand", but other sources confirm it was "Ferrand".) Their orphaned children, Melanie and Henri, joined the Speransky family. Henri was enrolled in the Page Corps, but died in 1811 during a cholera epidemic. Melanie went to Kiev to join Stephens, where she met Christian Gottlieb Bunge, a pediatrician honoured several times for his work. Melanie and Bunge married in 1806 in Kiev and had three children Ekaterina, Maria, and Heinrich. In February 1805, Konstantin resigned from the civil service and returned to the family estate in Volsk. Marianne returned to Saint Petersburg from Kiev, and Vasily bought an estate, Velikopolye, for her in the Novgorod Oblast and she moved there. (Note: Korff notes that this estate was purchased by Speransky for Marianne from monies she had received from her father-in-law, Vasily Zlobin, and himself. Sozinova includes a letter from Marianne to Speransky written in January 1804, in which Marianne states that she had been saving monies given to her, presumed by Korff to be from Zlobin, and that she was giving him ₽5,000 to make an investment to provide for the security of the family. Sozinova states that according to Korff, the purchase occurred in 1811, but Korff does not actually state when the property was purchased. 1811 in the section cited by Sozinova on page 282, refers to Henri Ferrand's death and continues that Marianne died afterward leaving the estate to Speranskaya. Mayorova states that after Konstantin left Saint Petersburg in 1805, Marianne moved to the estate.) At Velikopolye, Marianne took in a young man from Siberia, surnamed Stranek. They had an affair and she became pregnant with a daughter, Annette, known in Russian as Anyuta.

In the early summer of 1809, Stephens, Francis, and her grandchildren returned to Saint Petersburg at Speransky's request and moved into his new house near the Tauride Garden on Sergievskaya Street. Stephens and Speranskaya occupied the lower floor of the house, which had a hall, a drawing room, a dining room and his reception room, as well as a study where Speransky slept. Francis lived on the upper floor, which also housed Speransky's office. Days in Saint Petersburg were spent studying and evenings were full of entertainment with frequent guests. Marianne divorced Konstantin Zlobin in 1810 and made plans to marry Stranek. Early in 1811, Stephens and Speranskaya went to visit Marianne at Velikopolye for several months. Before Marianne and Stranek could marry, she died at the end of 1811, leaving her estate there to Speranskaya and her daughter to be cared for by Stephens.

Speransky had risen from being born on the Saltykov estate in Cherkutino, as the son of a priest who was a peasant with no surname, to the role of Secretary of State. (Note: Catherine Shuvalova was born into the Saltykov family.) He was the advisor who was closest to Alexander I between 1808 and 1812. In March 1812, Speransky fell out of favor with the Tsar, primarily because of his inability to cooperate or ingratiate himself with Russian nobility and was sent into exile. He left a note for Speranskaya that she and Stephens were to join him in Nizhny Novgorod as soon as it could be arranged. Francis and Annette accompanied his mother and niece. Stephens was bitter about the exile and concerned about how it would impact her reputation. She upset both Speransky and Speranskaya by spreading rumors that Annette was his illegitimate child. In the late summer, Speransky was relocated to Perm, approximately 2,000 kilometres (1,200 mi) east of Saint Petersburg, and Stephens moved there with the rest of the family. Because he was ostracized in Perm, Speransky sent the family back to Saint Petersburg at the end of 1813, but they continued to visit him. When Speransky had trouble getting messages delivered to Tsar Alexander to explain his financial difficulties, Speranskaya was able to deliver a letter to the emperor, who allotted her father an annual stipend. At the beginning of 1814, Speransky had the family move to Velikopolye and he joined them there later that year. At that time, he also returned to government service holding various provincial posts until 1821. Concerned that Stephens's bitterness would impact his daughter, in April 1815, he sent his mother-in-law to Kiev to live with Melanie Bunge. He agreed to pay Stephens a pension of 2,000 to 3,000 roubles annually, approximately 100 times the annual wage of a typical skilled worker in Saint Petersburg.

== Death and descendants ==
Stephens died on 25 December 1815 in Kiev. (Note: Numerous sources cite or infer that Stephens died in Kiev at the beginning of 1816. Amburger notes that the 1815 date is given on page 13 of Istoričeskie svendnija o sem'e Bunge v. Rossii (Historical News about the Bunge Family from Russia), which was published in Kiev in 1901. Written by Nikolai Bunge, the book confirms the death date given but indicates Stephens was born on 24 January 1780, which conflicts with other sources.) Her niece Melanie died in Kiev two months later, on 20 February 1816. After Stephens's death, Speransky and Speranskaya continued to care for Francis. He spent Sundays with Speransky and often traveled back and forth between his niece's home and her father's house, where he lived and was cared for. Speransky provided for his support and expenses, ensuring that he was not neglected. Francis died in November 1848.

Because Russian law forbade the recognition of an illegitimate child and imposed harsh penalties on the parents, (Note: Russian law forbade legitimization of children born outside of marriage under the Russkaya Pravda from the 11th century. Adoption of the Sobornoye Ulozheniye in 1649, barred even the ability to legitimize a child if the parents subsequently married. Punishment for a woman guilty of the "sin of fornication", of which an illegitimate child was evidence, ranged from forcibly requiring her to join a convent, to pay a fine, or to complete a ten-year penance. Peter the Great imposed imprisonment as a penalty for the father and required fathers to support their illegitimate offspring. Legitimization remained banned except in extraordinary circumstances until 1902.) Speransky came up with a plan to care for Annette and protect her from the social stigma attached to illegitimacy. In February 1816, he brought her from Kiev back to Velikopolye. Enlisting the help of Maria Weikard, he proposed that Annette be enrolled in a boarding school in Saint Petersburg, where she could study music, English, French, German, and Russian, and be raised in the Russian Orthodox faith. To explain why he was providing funds for her, Annette was to be enrolled under the name of Anna Andreevna Smirnovna, as the fictitious orphan daughter of Speransky's nephew, Andrey Smirnov, who had died without having any children. She studied in the boarding house of Madame Vogel and prepared to graduate in the middle of February 1824. In April 1825, at the home of Alexei Andreyevich Yelagin and his cousin Avdotya Yelagina in Saint Petersburg, Annette married Alexey Osipovich Imberg, an administrator for Nikolai Repnin-Volkonsky, the Governor-General of the Poltava Governorate. Their first child was born in 1826 and others in 1827 and 1828. Speransky continued to support their family, sending an allowance of 1,000 rubles annually, approximately 40 times the annual wage of a typical skilled worker in Saint Petersburg. In 1830, he secured a position for Imberg in Vilna, where he worked as the postal inspector. Imberg was granted the Order of St. Stanislav, recognising meritorious service, in the 2nd degree in 1836 and the following year had another child.

In 1816, Speranskaya returned to Saint Petersburg, where she resided with Maria Weikard, who served as her surrogate mother. After passing her examination in 1819, she began teaching. Three years later, she became a lady-in-waiting to Louise of Baden, who had become Tsarina of Russia. Married in 1822 to Prince Alexander Frolov-Bagreev, the governor of the Chernigov Governorate, she subsequently had three children. Her father bought her another estate, Velyka Burimka near Poltava in Ukraine in 1831. Until 1850, she managed her estates and then moved to Vienna, where she became a writer until her death in 1857. Both of her sons died young. Her daughter, Maria Frolova-Bagreeva, married Prince Rodion Nikolaevich Cantacuzène on 19 November 1846, and they took over management of Speranskaya's estates when she moved to Austria. Maria's son, Mikhail Rodionovich Cantacuzène, was granted his grandfather's title of Count Speransky during the centennial celebrations for Speransky's birth in 1872. His son, Mikhail, by Elizabeth Sicard, married Julia Dent Grant, granddaughter of United States President Ulysses S. Grant in 1899. The Velyka Burimka estate was destroyed by the Bolsheviks during the Ukrainian–Soviet War in 1918. When the area became Soviet Ukraine in 1919, the family fled, first to Kiev and then abroad to Constantinople, Malta, and eventually Paris. The Velikopolye estate was destroyed during World War II.
