= Elizabeth Parish =

English governess and lady's companion

Elizabeth Parish (née Planta; 1740/41 – 24 April 1823) was a Swiss-born English governess and lady's companion. She was the daughter of Swiss-born reformed pastor Andreas Planta who became assistant librarian at the British Museum in 1758, and the sister of Joseph Planta, who became principal librarian. She worked for the Bowes-Lyon family in several roles: first, she was governess to Mary Eleanor Bowes, then she became lady's companion to her mother, Mary Bowes née Gilbert. She was the governess of Mary Eleanor Bowes's children until she was dismissed from service in 1776, receiving a generous payoff of £2,000. In 1777, she married John Parish, Superintendent of Ordnance and a member of the Society of Antiquaries. From 1785, she worked for the Bowes-Lyon family again, as governess for Mary Eleanor's daughter Anna Maria Bowes, who escaped her custody and eloped in 1788. Parish moved to Gibraltar with her husband in 1791, returning to England after his death. She died in Petersham in 1823. Two volumes of music in her hand are archived at the Accademia Nazionale di Santa Cecilia, one containing among other vocal works 18 compositions of Maurice Greene, and another one with music from operas.

== Early life and family ==
Parish was born as Elizabeth Planta in 1740 or 1741, to Andreas Planta, a Swiss Reformed pastor who was at the time working in the Swiss town of Castasegna, one of only a few parishes with an Italian-speaking Protestant population. Her mother was Margarete Scartazzini de Bolgiani from Bondo. She had several sisters including Frederica Planta, who became governess and English teacher of the daughters of George III and Queen Charlotte, and one brother, Joseph Planta, later principal librarian of the British Museum. After spending time in Erlangen and Ansbach from 1745, her father moved to London with his family in 1752 to become pastor of the German Reformed congregation at the Savoy Chapel in London where he took up the position of assistant librarian at the British Museum in 1758. The family continued to speak Romansh at home during their time in London.

== Work for the Bowes-Lyon family ==
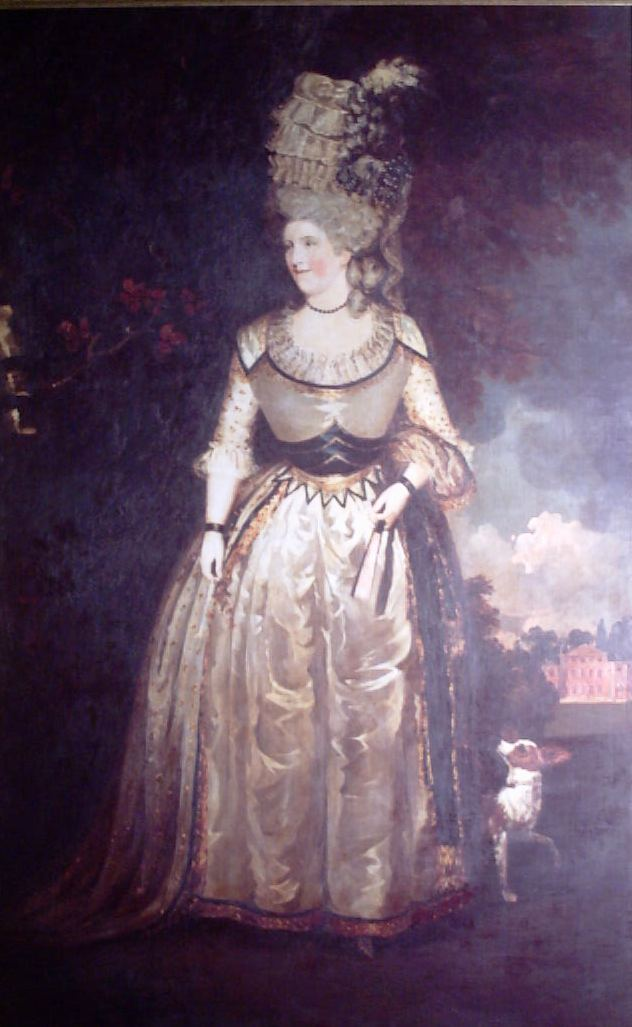
Mary Eleanor Bowes

From 1757, Planta worked for the Bowes-Lyon family as governess to eight-year-old Mary Eleanor Bowes; in the same year her father was engaged as the child's French teacher. In addition to serving as Mary Eleanor's teacher, Planta was also her chaperone and accompanied her to cultural outings. After the death of her father, George Bowes in 1760, Mary Eleanor became heiress of a vast fortune. In the absence of her mother Mary (née Gilbert) Bowes, who left London and returned to her home in St Paul's Walden Bury, Mary Eleanor was brought up by her aunt Jane Bowes, together with Planta and several teachers. During this time, the influence of the Planta family (both Elizabeth and her father Andrew) may have started Mary Eleanor's lifelong interest in botany.

Planta worked as governess until 1767, when Mary Eleanor married John Lyon, the 9th Earl of Strathmore and Kinghorne, who took her last name. Planta, who had advised against the marriage, was kept in the family's employ as lady's companion to Mary Eleanor's mother Mary Bowes, often accompanying her to the opera. Planta and the younger Mary kept in contact, writing letters in French and Italian. When she was offered the post as the English teacher to the daughters of George III and Queen Charlotte in 1771, she declined the offer, expecting better rewards from staying with the Bowes family. Her sister Frederica was then appointed at court, receiving a salary of £100 that Planta described as "mediocre". In 1774, she returned to Bowes's employ as governess of her children.

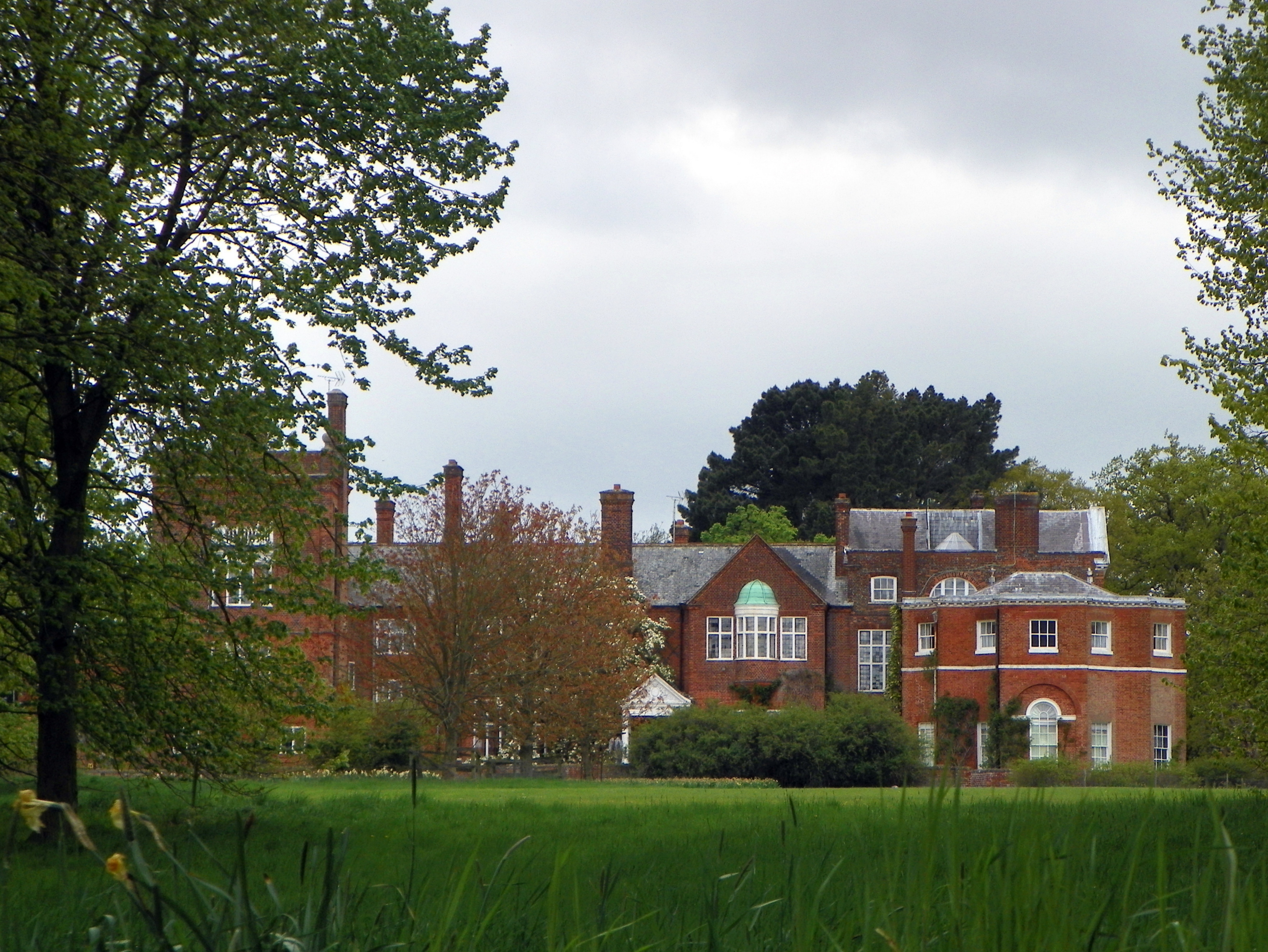
St Paul's Walden Bury

After the Earl of Strathmore and Kinghorne's 1776 death, Planta and the children lived in St Paul's Walden Bury, while Bowes stayed in London to be with her lover George Gray. Afraid that Planta, who had become suspicious of her affair with Gray and possibly her pregnancy and abortion of a child conceived with her lover before her husband had died, could mention this to her mother or the Strathmore family, Bowes dismissed her from service with a generous payoff of £2000 in July 1776. As reason for the dismissal she cited bad behaviour and deceit as well as poor treatment of her children by Planta, but there is no evidence of any wrongdoing on the part of the governess. In his biography The Unhappy Countess, author Ralph Arnold stated the relationship between Planta and her mistress was "puzzling". In her Confessions, Bowes later described the situation, referring to Planta by her married name, Parish: "Mrs Parish had displeased me so much, and, apt as I am to be disposed on, had shewn such proofs of a dirty interestedness, that I determined to part with her; but, as she had lived with, and partly educated me so many years, was resolved it should be on good terms; therefore, I resolved to raise 2000 pounds by any means, the first money I expended." As the new governess for the children, Planta's 19-year-old sister Eliza Planta was hired. In the second half of 1776, Andrew Robinson Stoney started his schemes to become Bowes's husband. Eliza Planta was increasingly involved in these schemes. In November, reverend Henry Stephens was hired as tutor to Bowes's younger children, and ten days after eloped with Eliza, who was pregnant at the time. This elopement was encouraged by Bowes, in part as retribution against Elizabeth Planta.

In 1785, when Bowes was trying to flee the control of her abusive husband, her first husband's family including her brother-in-law Thomas Lyon was not supportive. Lyon placed Bowes's daughter Anna Maria in Parish's care, nine years after her previous dismissal, with the intention to keep her independent spirit under control. Anna lived with Parish in Fludyer Street (then a narrow street parallel to Downing Street), Westminster. Parish, who was described as pious and sanctimonious, kept a close watch on sixteen-year-old Anna's activities and reading matter, for example once confiscating a book "not fit for the reading of a young Person". However, she failed to notice her charge's exchange of love letters with Henry Jessop, a young lawyer living opposite of her who was in debt. According to a letter by Anthony Morris Storer to William Eden, 1st Baron Auckland, Anna had "never seen this man but at his window". In January 1788, Anna crawled over a plank from her window to Jessop's, crossing the narrow street, and the two eloped and married on 28 January. The Newcastle Journal, when describing the events leading up to the marriage, wrote that "not the least suspicion was ever entertained by Mrs. P".

== Marriage and death ==
On 30 March 1777, Planta married John Parish, who was Superintendent of Ordnance at the Tower of London. Their marriage was childless. John Parish became a member of the Society of Antiquaries on 28 May 1778. His nephew Woodbine Parish visited him in 1780 and struck up a friendship with Joseph Planta, and their sons, the diplomat Woodbine Parish and Foreign Office civil servant and politician Joseph Planta also were close friends later. John became Ordnance Storekeeper in Gibraltar in 1791, and the couple moved there. After her husband's 1798 death, Parish returned to England and died in Petersham on 24 April 1823, aged 82.

== Archived musical manuscripts ==
Some evidence of Parish's interest in music can be found in archived manuscripts: Two volumes of music and annotations in Parish's hand are held at the Accademia Nazionale di Santa Cecilia as part of the "Fondo Mario", the music collection of Giovanni Matteo Mario that was donated in 1926. The first volume, clearly marked with both Parish's birth and married name, contains 34 items of vocal music including 18 compositions by Maurice Greene. Other works include four duets by Agostino Steffani, a canzonetta by Mattia Vento, the six canzonette op. 6 of Johann Christian Bach and three arias from Giovanni Battista Pergolesi's L'Olimpiade as well as some works where the composer is unknown. The majority of the compositions are in Italian and scored as chamber music. According to musicologist Michael Talbot, it is likely that Parish's access to and inside knowledge about Greene's music came from Mary (née Gilbert) Bowes, who had performed the title role in one of his operas before her marriage and who had later received visits and musical manuscripts from Greene. The second volume, titled Italian Songs, contains opera music, extracted from operas that were performed in London between 1765 and 1777.

== Sources ==
- Arnold, Ralph (1987) [1957]. The unhappy countess and her grandson John Bowes. London: Constable.
- Auckland, William Eden Baron (1861). The Journal and Correspondence of William, Lord Auckland. R. Bentley.
- Badilatti, Michele (31 October 2017). "Die altehrwürdige Sprache der Söldner und Bauern – Die Veredelung des Bündnerromanischen bei Joseph Planta (1744–1827)". Swiss Academies Reports (in German). 12 (6). doi:10.5281/zenodo.1039850.
- Baudino, Isabelle; Carré, Jacques (2 March 2017). The Invisible Woman: Aspects of Women's Work in Eighteenth-Century Britain. Routledge. ISBN 978-1-351-88735-9.
- Bowes, Mary Eleanor (1793). The Confessions of the Countess of Strathmore. Printed for W. Locke.
- de Beer, Gavin Rylands (1 October 1952). "Andreas and Joseph Planta, FF. R. S". Notes and Records of the Royal Society of London. 10 (1): 8–14. doi:10.1098/rsnr.1952.0003. S2CID 202575252.
- Contti, Torlach Mac (1 May 2013). "Ils Plantas ell'Engheltiara ed ella Russia". Südostschweiz (in Romansh).
- Fraser, Flora (2004). Princesses: the six daughters of George III. London: John Murray. ISBN 978-0-7195-6108-5.
- Hächler, Stefan (9 November 2011). "Andreas von Planta". Historisches Lexikon der Schweiz (in German).
- Hartmann, Benedict (1951). "Beiträge zur Biographie Martin Plantas". Bündnerisches Monatsblatt (in German) (7–8): 193–207. doi:10.5169/seals-397506.
- Hills, Nina Louise Kay Shuttleworth (1910). A life of Sir Woodbine Parish (1796-1882). London: Smith, Elder & Co.
- Moore, Wendy (2009). Wedlock: the true story of the disastrous marriage and remarkable divorce of Mary Eleanor Bowes, Countess of Strathmore. New York. ISBN 978-0-307-38336-5. OCLC 232980259.
- Schlez, Mariano Martín (15 September 2022). The Woodbine Parish Report on the Revolutions in South America (1822): The Foreign Office and Early British Intelligence on Latin America. Liverpool University Press. ISBN 978-1-80207-911-1.
- Society of Antiquaries of London (1798). A List of the Members of the Society of Antiquaries of London, from Their Revival in 1717, to June 19, 1796. Arranged in Chronological and Alphabetical Order. John Nichols.
- Talbot, Michael (2017). "Maurice Greene's Vocal Chamber Music on Italian Texts". Royal Musical Association Research Chronicle. 48: 91–124. doi:10.1080/14723808.2016.1271573. ISSN 1472-3808. S2CID 191988956.
- von Planta, Eleonore (1993). "Ein Bündner in England". Bündner Jahrbuch: Zeitschrift für Kunst, Kultur und Geschichte Graubündens (in German). 35: 34–38. doi:10.5169/seals-555573.
- Waller, Maureen (2010). The English marriage: tales of love, money and adultery. London: John Murray. ISBN 978-1-84854-401-7.
- "Deaths". The Gentleman's Magazine. Vol. 93 Part 1. London: E. Cave. 1823. pp. 572–575.
