= Claude Bowes-Lyon, 13th Earl of Strathmore and Kinghorne =

British peer (1824–1904)

The Right Honourable The Earl of Strathmore and Kinghorne
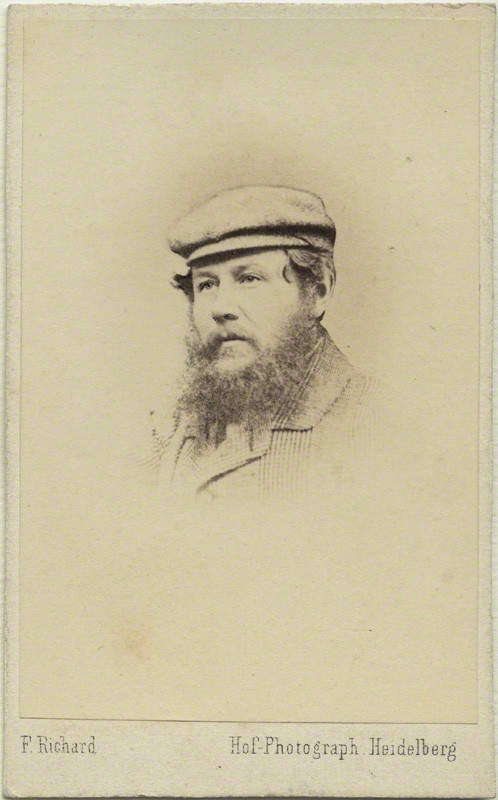
- Bowes-Lyon in the 1860s

Personal details
- Born: Claude George Lyon-Bowes; 21 July 1824 Redbourn, Hertfordshire, England
- Died: 16 February 1904 (aged 79) Bordighera, Liguria, Italy
- Spouse: Frances Smith (m. 1853)
- Children: 11, including Claude, Herbert, and Patrick
- Parents: Thomas Lyon-Bowes, Lord Glamis (father); Charlotte Grimstead (mother)

Claude Bowes-Lyon, 13th Earl of Strathmore and Kinghorne (21 July 1824 – 16 February 1904), styled The Honourable Claude Bowes-Lyon from 1847 to 1865, was a Scottish peer. He was the 13th holder of the Earldom of Strathmore and Kinghorne, the paternal grandfather of Queen Elizabeth the Queen Mother, and a great-grandfather of Queen Elizabeth II.

== Life ==
Claude Lyon-Bowes was born in Redbourn, Hertfordshire. He was the second surviving son of Thomas George Lyon-Bowes, Lord Glamis (son of the 11th Earl), and his wife Charlotte Grimstead. His paternal grandparents were Thomas Lyon-Bowes, 11th Earl of Strathmore and Kinghorne, and his first wife, Mary Elizabeth Louisa Rodney Carpenter. His maternal grandparents were Joseph Valentine Grimstead, of Ewood Park and Merry Hall, Ashtead, Surrey, and his wife Charlotte Jane Sarah Walsh. Born Claude Lyon-Bowes, he altered the family name to Bowes-Lyon.

Bowes-Lyon also played cricket, making four appearances in first-class cricket, appearing three times for the Marylebone Cricket Club between 1843 and 1846, and once for the Gentlemen of England in 1846. In 1865 he succeeded his elder brother Thomas. The Canadian Pacific Railway named Strathmore, Alberta in his honour in 1884. In 1887 he was created Baron Bowes, of Streatlam Castle and Lunedale, in the Peerage of the United Kingdom. He was a Scottish representative peer from 1870 until 1892, and Lord Lieutenant of Angus from 1874 until his death.

== Marriage and family ==
On 28 September 1853, Claude married Frances Dora Smith (29 July 1832 – 5 February 1922). They had 11 children:

- Claude Bowes-Lyon, 14th Earl of Strathmore and Kinghorne (14 March 1855 – 7 November 1944), married Cecilia Cavendish-Bentinck (11 September 1862 – 23 June 1938) on 16 July 1881. They had 10 children, including Queen Elizabeth the Queen Mother, the mother of Queen Elizabeth II.
- Francis Bowes-Lyon (23 February 1856 – 18 February 1948), married Lady Anne Lindsay (24 December 1858 – 15 December 1936) on 23 November 1883. They had 7 children, including Lilian Bowes Lyon.
- Ernest Bowes-Lyon (4 August 1858 – 27 December 1891), married Isobel Hester Drummond (21 May 1860 – 15 July 1945) on 23 August 1882. They had 6 children, including Ernestine Bowes-Lyon.
- Herbert Bowes-Lyon (15 August 1860 – 14 April 1897), never married.
- Maj. Patrick Bowes-Lyon (5 March 1863 – 5 October 1946), a major of the British Army and a tennis player. He married Alice Wiltshire (1867 – 1 March 1953) on 9 August 1893. They had 4 children.
- Lady Constance Frances Bowes-Lyon (8 October 1865 – 19 November 1951), married Robert Blackburn (27 April 1864 – 21 March 1944) on 21 December 1893. They had 4 children.
- Kenneth Bowes-Lyon (26 April 1867 – 9 January 1911), never married.
- Lady Mildred Marion Bowes-Lyon (6 October 1868 – 9 June 1897), a music composer, famous for Etelinda (an opera premiered in Florence in 1894). She married Augustus Jessup (20 June 1861 – 16 October 1925) on 1 July 1890. They had 2 children.
- Lady Maud Agnes Bowes-Lyon (12 June 1870 – 28 February 1941), never married.
- Lady Evelyn Mary Bowes-Lyon (16 July 1872 – 15 March 1876), died in infancy.
- Lieut. Col. Malcolm Bowes-Lyon (23 April 1874 – 23 August 1957), a lieutenant colonel of the British Army. He married Winifred Gurdon-Rebow (10 October 1876 – 30 May 1957) on 28 September 1907. They had a daughter.

== Death and estates ==
The Earl died in Bordighera, the Italian Riviera, in his Villa Etelinda, so named for the opera composed by his daughter Lady Mildred Marion. The villa was later sold by his widow in 1913 to the Italian Queen Mother Queen Margherita.

His personal estate was valued at £233,927 for probate, and his entailed estates were valued at £716,150. £14,903 in estate taxes were levied on his estate, which included:

- £39,802 in life insurance policies
- The household furniture, pictures, books and other effects at Streatlam Castle, valued at £4,750
- The plate at Streatlam Castle, valued at £1,515
- The farm stock, crops, equipment, etc. at Stratham Castle, valued at £2,625
- The entailed lands and estates, including Glamis Castle, valued at £380,000
- The Streatlam Caste and Wemmergill Estates, valued at £250,000
- Farmland and woodland at Slaley, Northumberland valued at £35,000

=== Estate of John Bowes ===
The valuation of Lord Strathmore's personal estate included approximately £100,000 which was value placed on Strathmore's interest in the estate of his deceased first-cousin-once removed John Bowes. John Bowes was the biological son of the Strathmore's great-uncle John Bowes, 10th Earl of Strathmore and Kinghorne and the Earl's mistress; the 10th Earl had married John Bowes' mother on his deathbed, and attempted to legitimise his natural son as the heir to all of his properties and titles under the terms of his Will. This resulted in significant litigation over the family estates following the 10th Earl's death in 1820; ultimately the Courts declared that although Scottish Law could permit the retrospective legitimisation of a child born out of wedlock if the child's parents subsequently married, the 10th Earl had been domiciled in England, and thus English law applied. The result was that John Bowes inherited the 10th Earl's English estates, which produced an income of approximately £20,000 annually, whilst the 10th Earl's younger brother inherited the family's Scottish Estates and the Earldom. As John Bowes had died childless in 1885, the terms of the settlement of English properties under the Will of the 10th Earl resulted in these estates reverting to the Earl of Strathmore and Kinghorne.

=== Will ===
Under the terms of his will, he made the following bequests to his family:

- £12,000 outright and £2,000 annually to his widow
- £8,000 to his son The Hon. Patrick Bowes-Lyon
- £12,000 to his son The Hon. Malcolm Bowes-Lyon
- £12,000 to his daughter Lady Maud Bowes-Lyon
- £12,000 to his daughter Lady Constance Blackburn
- £23,000 to be divided equally amongst the children of his late son The Hon. Ernest Bowes-Lyon
- £5,000 to his son The Hon. Francis Bowes-Lyon
- All of the pictures, furniture, stock, equipment, household effects and other contents of the estates at Glamis Castle, Wemmorgile Lodge, and Streatham Castle, as well as the residuary Bowes Estate to his eldest son and heir Claude Bowes-Lyon, Lord Glamis.
- A life interest in half of the residuary of the personal estate to his widow, and the other half of the residuary of the personal estate (excluding the Bowes Estate) in equal shares to his younger children.

== Ancestry ==
Ancestors of Claude Bowes-Lyon, 13th Earl of Strathmore and Kinghorne

8. John Lyon, 9th Earl of Strathmore and Kinghorne
4. Thomas Lyon-Bowes, 11th Earl of Strathmore and Kinghorne
9. Mary Eleanor Bowes
2. Thomas Lyon-Bowes, Lord Glamis
10. George Carpenter
5. Mary Elizabeth Louisa Carpenter
11. Mary Elizabeth Walsh
1. Claude Bowes-Lyon, 13th Earl of Strathmore and Kinghorne
12. Thomas Grimstead
6. Joseph Valentine Grimstead
13. Eleanor Creswick
3. Charlotte Grimstead
14. John Walsh
7. Charlotte Jane Sarah Walsh
15. Elizabeth

Honorary titles
Preceded by The Earl of Dalhousie	Lord Lieutenant of Forfarshire; 1874–1904	Succeeded by The Earl of Strathmore and Kinghrone
Peerage of the United Kingdom
New creation	Baron Bowes; 1887–1904	Succeeded by Claude Bowes-Lyon
Peerage of Scotland
Preceded by Thomas Lyon-Bowes	Earl of Strathmore and Kinghorne; 1865–1904	Succeeded by Claude Bowes-Lyon
