= Frederica Planta =

English royal governess (1750–1778)

Frederica Planta or Friderica Planta (10 November 1750 – 2 February 1778) was governess and English teacher for the children of George III and Queen Charlotte of Great Britain. She was the daughter of pastor Andreas Planta, assistant librarian at the British Museum, and the sister of librarian Joseph Planta. After her unexpected death, she was succeeded as teacher of the royal children by her sister Margaret Planta.

== Early life and family ==
Planta was born on 10 November 1750, while her father Andreas Planta (1717–1773), originally a Swiss reformed pastor, worked at the Ansbach court of Charles William Frederick, Margrave of Brandenburg-Ansbach and likely also taught mathematics at the Gymnasium Carolinum. Her mother was Margarete Scartazzini de Bolgiani from Bondo. Planta's first name Frederica, atypical for her mother's Val Bregaglia region of origin and more typical of Brandenburg, may have been chosen in honour of her father's employer and family. She had several sisters and one brother, Joseph Planta (1744–1827), later principal librarian of the British Museum. In 1752, her father moved to London to become pastor of the German Reformed congregation at the Savoy Chapel in London where he became assistant librarian at the British Museum in 1758. After 1761, he taught Italian to Queen Charlotte.

== Work at court ==
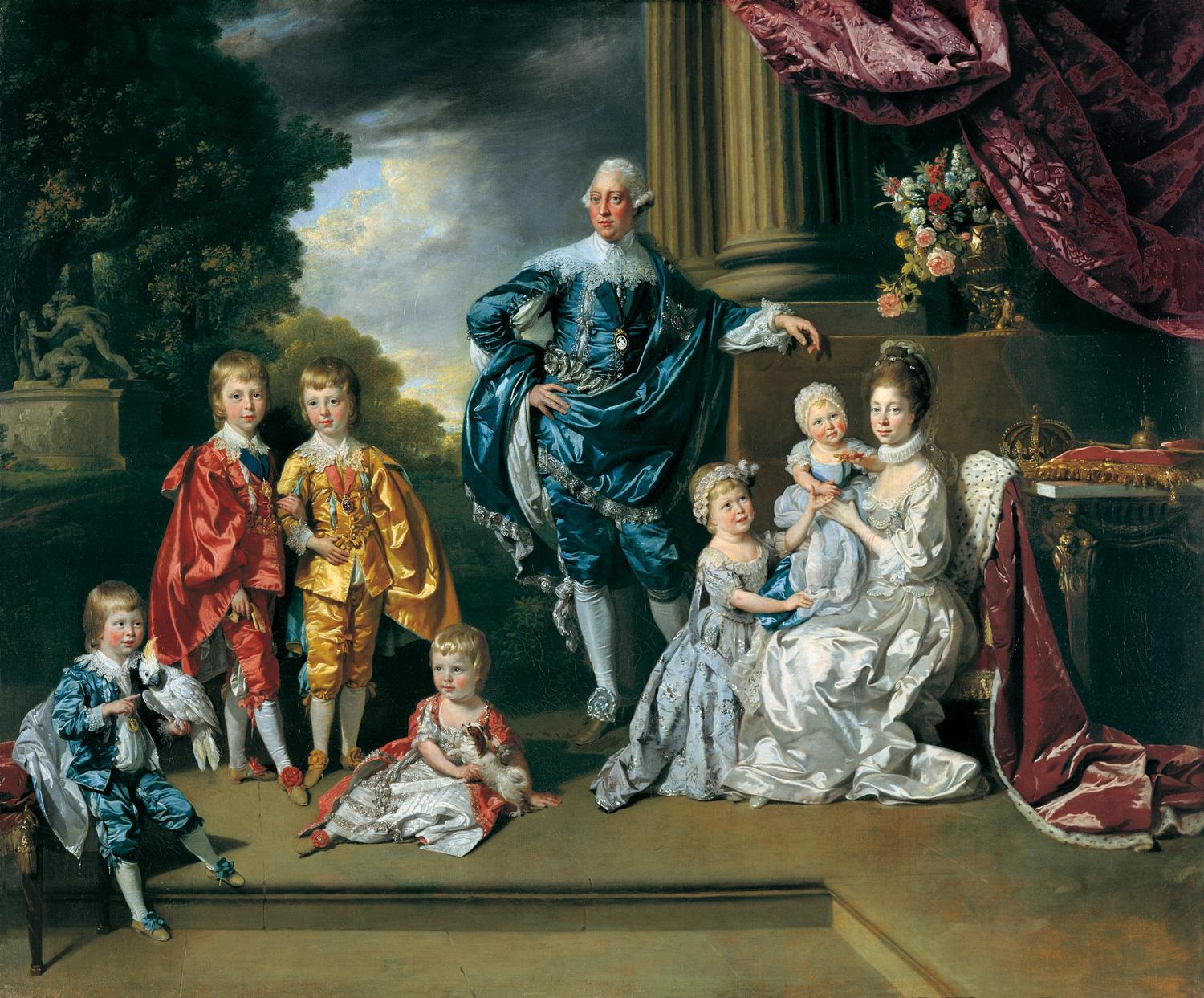
George III, Queen Charlotte and their Six Eldest Children, painting by Johan Zoffany, 1770

In July 1771, Planta was engaged as governess at the court of George III and Queen Charlotte, under the main governess Lady Charlotte Finch. The royal family had first tried to hire her older sister Elizabeth Planta, but she had declined as she preferred to continue to work for Mary Eleanor Bowes. Previously, Frederica had been working as a governess for Lady Hoskyns and was only released from that employment after the Queen's personal intervention, despite her previous employer's protest. Planta, who knew seven languages including Latin and Greek, was supposed to teach the children to read first English, then other languages, as well as reading, writing and the foundations of all subjects. She was described as "a most pious Christian" and lived close to the Royal Family at Kew Palace. Queen Charlotte was interested in the theory and practice of education, and was an early supporter of education delivered through play. Planta delivered this, "gain[ing] their affection by making their learning much play as possible", as she wrote in a letter. For education in the history of England, she had designed cards that her charges should put in the correct order, and she considered this as a successful teaching tool, to be used together with stories. Planta's salary was £100 a year (£16,559 in 2023); from 1773, she received an additional £50 (£8,025 in 2023) for food, tea, chocolate, coffee and sugar. She also did not have to pay for her accommodation or sedan chair porters. Her sister Elizabeth considered Frederica's working conditions and salary to be "quite mediocre".

== Death ==
Planta died on 2 February 1778, of an "accidental illness". Like her father, she was buried at St George's, Bloomsbury. Her sister Margaret Planta (known as "Peggy") succeeded her sister as governess and English teacher at court.

== Sources ==
- Baudino, Isabelle; Carré, Jacques (2 March 2017). The Invisible Woman: Aspects of Women's Work in Eighteenth-Century Britain. Routledge. ISBN 978-1-351-88735-9.
- de Beer, Gavin Rylands (1 October 1952). "Andreas and Joseph Planta, FF. R. S". Notes and Records of the Royal Society of London. 10 (1): 8–14. doi:10.1098/rsnr.1952.0003. S2CID 202575252.
- Fraser, Flora (2004). Princesses : the six daughters of George III. London: John Murray. ISBN 978-0-7195-6108-5.
- Gribling, Barbara (2020). "Playing with the past: child consumers, pedagogy and British history games, c. 1780–1850". In Davies, Rachel Bryant; Gribling, Barbara (eds.). Pasts at play: Childhood encounters with history in British culture, 1750–1914. Manchester University Press. pp. 193–220. ISBN 978-1-5261-2889-8. JSTOR j.ctv1dhpgrf.
- Hächler, Stefan (9 November 2011). "Andreas von Planta". Historisches Lexikon der Schweiz (in German).
- Hadlow, Janice (2014). A royal experiment : the private life of King George III. New York: Henry Holt and Company. ISBN 978-0-8050-9656-9.
- Harris, P. R. (3 January 2008). "Planta, Joseph". Oxford Dictionary of National Biography (online ed.). Oxford University Press. doi:10.1093/ref:odnb/22353. (Subscription, Wikipedia Library access or UK public library membership required.)
- Hartmann, Benedict (1951). "Beiträge zur Biographie Martin Plantas". Bündnerisches Monatsblatt (in German) (7–8): 193–207. doi:10.5169/seals-397506.
- Kassler, Michael (24 March 2021). The Memoirs of Charlotte Papendiek (1765–1840): Court, Musical and Artistic Life in the Time of King George III: Memoirs of the Court of George III, Volume 1. Routledge. ISBN 978-1-000-41986-3.
- Moore, Wendy (2009). Wedlock : the true story of the disastrous marriage and remarkable divorce of Mary Eleanor Bowes, Countess of Strathmore. New York. ISBN 978-0-307-38336-5. OCLC 232980259.
- Percy, Carol (2012). "The king's speech: metalanguage of nation, man and class in anecdotes about George III". English Language & Linguistics. 16 (2): 281–299. doi:10.1017/S1360674312000068. ISSN 1469-4379. S2CID 122205354.
- von Planta, Eleonore (1993). "Ein Bündner in England". Bündner Jahrbuch: Zeitschrift für Kunst, Kultur und Geschichte Graubündens (in German). 35: 34–38. doi:10.5169/seals-555573.
