= Joseph Planta =

Joseph Planta could refer to:

- Joseph Planta (librarian) (1744–1827), British librarian
- Joseph Planta (politician) (1787–1847), British politician, and son of the librarian
