= Baron Bowes =

Extinct barony in the Peerage of the United Kingdom

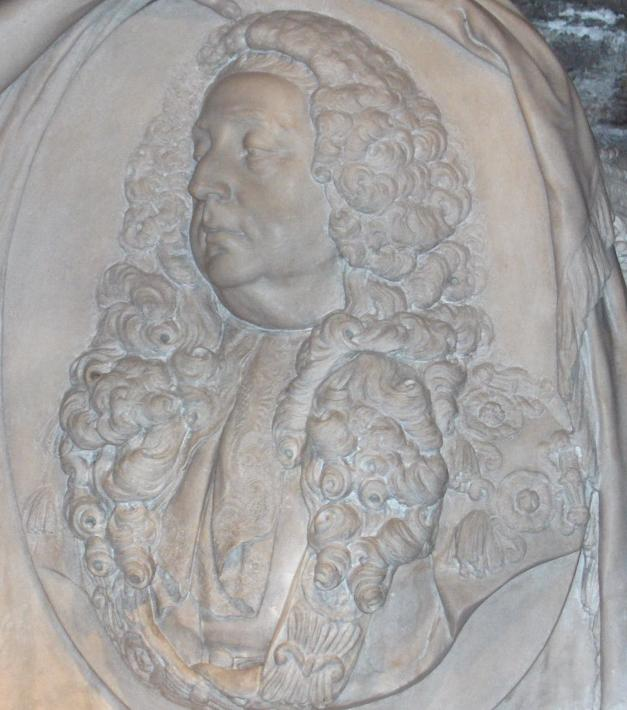
Lord Chancellor of Ireland Lord Bowes.

Baron Bowes is a title that has been created three times, once in the Peerage of Ireland and twice in the Peerage of the United Kingdom. The first creation came in the Peerage of Ireland on 15 August 1758 when John Bowes, Lord Chancellor of Ireland, was made Baron Bowes, of Clonlyon. The title became extinct on his death in 1767. The second creation came in the Peerage of the United Kingdom on 7 August 1815 when John Bowes, 10th Earl of Strathmore and Kinghorne, was made Baron Bowes, of Streatlam Castle in the County of Durham and of Lunedale in the County of York. The barony became extinct on his death in 1820 while the earldom was passed on to his younger brother, the eleventh Earl. The barony was revived on 1 July 1887 when the latter's grandson, Claude Bowes-Lyon, 13th Earl of Strathmore and Kinghorne, was made Baron Bowes, of Streatlam Castle in the County of Durham and of Lunedale in the County of York. See Earl of Strathmore and Kinghorne for further history of the title.

== Baron Bowes (1758) ==
- John Bowes, 1st Baron Bowes (1691–1767)

== Baron Bowes (1815) ==
- see Earl of Strathmore and Kinghorne

== Baron Bowes (1887) ==
- see Earl of Strathmore and Kinghorne
