= Thomas Lyon-Bowes, 12th Earl of Strathmore and Kinghorne =

Scottish peer and cricketer

The Right Honourable The Earl of Strathmore and Kinghorne
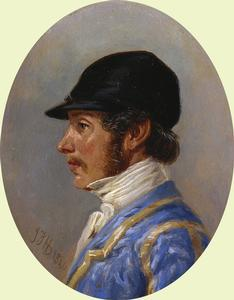
- The Earl of Strathmore and Kinghorne, 1846.

Personal details
- Born: Thomas George Lyon-Bowes; 28 September 1822 St Paul's Walden, Hertfordshire, England
- Died: 13 September 1865 (aged 42) Glamis, Angus, Scotland
- Spouse: Charlotte Maria Barrington (m. 1850; died 1854)
- Parent(s): Thomas Lyon-Bowes, Lord Glamis; Charlotte Grimstead

Thomas George Lyon-Bowes, 12th Earl of Strathmore and Kinghorne (28 September 1822 – 13 September 1865), styled Lord Glamis between 1834 and 1846, was a Scottish peer and cricketer.

== Background ==
Lyon-Bowes was the eldest surviving son of Thomas Lyon-Bowes, Lord Glamis, son of Thomas Bowes-Lyon, 11th Earl of Strathmore and Kinghorne. His mother was Charlotte Grimstead, daughter of Joseph Valentine Grimstead, of Merry Hall, Lower Ashtead, Surrey. He succeeded his grandfather in the earldom in 1846.

== Public life ==
An amateur cricketer, Strathmore played first-class cricket for the Marylebone Cricket Club from 1844 to 1857. In 1852 he was elected a Scottish representative peer, a post he held until July 1865.

== Personal life ==
Lord Strathmore married the Honourable Charlotte Maria Barrington, daughter of William Barrington, 6th Viscount Barrington, on 30 April 1850. The marriage was childless. She died on 3 November 1854, aged 27. Lord Strathmore died on 13 September 1865, aged 42, and was succeeded in the earldom by his younger brother, Claude.

Peerage of Scotland
Preceded by Thomas Bowes-Lyon	Earl of Strathmore and Kinghorne; 1846–1865	Succeeded by Claude Bowes-Lyon
