= Thomas Lyon-Bowes, 11th Earl of Strathmore and Kinghorne =

Scottish nobleman

The Right Honourable The Earl of Strathmore and Kinghorne
- Born: 3 May 1773; Durham, County Durham, England
- Died: 27 August 1846 (aged 73); Holyrood Palace, Edinburgh, Scotland
- Title: 11th Earl of Strathmore and Kinghorne
- Spouses: Mary Elizabeth Carpenter (m. 1800; died 1811); Elizabeth Northcote (m. 1812); Marianna Cheape (m. 1817)
- Children: 3
- Parents: John Bowes, 9th Earl of Strathmore and Kinghorne (father); Mary Bowes (mother)

Thomas Lyon-Bowes, 11th Earl of Strathmore and Kinghorne (3 May 1773 – 27 August 1846) was a Scottish nobleman and peer. He was the third son of John Bowes, 9th Earl of Strathmore and Kinghorne, and Mary Bowes, Countess of Strathmore and Kinghorne. His mother was the author of the verse drama, "The Siege of Jerusalem" (1769). He was the great-great-grandfather of Queen Elizabeth The Queen Mother.

== Earldom ==
Lyon-Bowes's eldest brother was John Bowes, 10th Earl of Strathmore and Kinghorne, who had a long affair with Mary Milner. Their only son John Bowes was only legitimized following the demise of his father. He inherited most of the real estate of his father, but none of his titles.

The second brother was George Bowes-Lyon who had married Mary Thornhill, but died childless on 26 December 1806. Lyon-Bowes was their only legitimate heir, and became the new Earl of Strathmore and Kinghorne on 3 July 1820.

== Marriages and issue ==
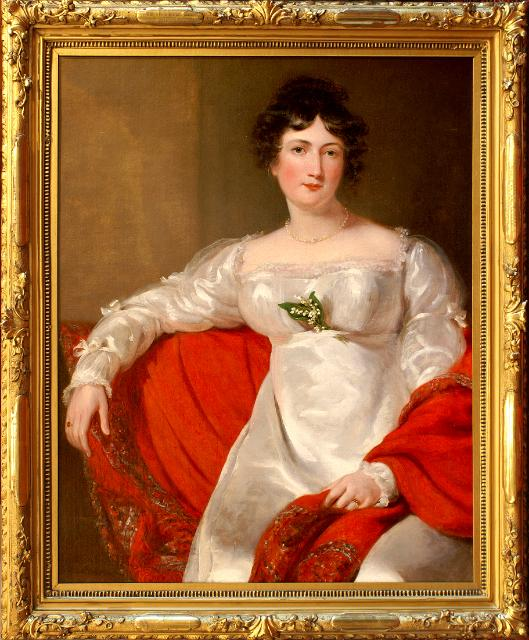
Mary Elizabeth Louisa Rodney Carpenter

On 25 March 1800, Lyon-Bowes married firstly Mary Elizabeth Louisa Rodney Carpenter (1 January 1783 – 1 June 1811), only daughter and heir of George Carpenter, Esq. (1713–1782) and his wife Mary Elizabeth Walsh (1758–1812). They had two children:

- Thomas George Lyon-Bowes, Lord Glamis (6 February 1801 – 27 January 1834). He was the father of Thomas Lyon-Bowes, Master of Glamis, Thomas Lyon-Bowes, 12th Earl of Strathmore and Kinghorne, and Claude Bowes-Lyon, 13th Earl of Strathmore and Kinghorne.
- Mary Isabella Lyon-Bowes (8 August 1802 – 11 September 1836). Married John Walpole Willis.

His second wife was Elizabeth Northcote, daughter to a Colonel of the British Army. Their marriage was solemnized at St George the Martyr, Southwark on 6 September 1812. There are no records of when or if the marriage was dissolved. They had one daughter:

- Sarah Eliza Bowes-Lyon (8 August 1813 – 6 June 1847). She married firstly, George Augustus Campbell, of the East India Company, son of Robert Campbell, 10th of Skipness (descended from Archibald Campbell, 2nd Earl of Argyll); she married secondly General Charles Philip de Ainslie.

On 8 December 1817, Lyon-Bowes married his third wife, Marianna Cheape, daughter of Captain John Cheape. This marriage remained childless but lasted until his death in 1846.

He was succeeded as the 12th Earl of Strathmore by his grandson Thomas Lyon-Bowes.

Honorary titles
Preceded by Sir William Manners	High Sheriff of Leicestershire; 1810	Succeeded by Richard Norman
Peerage of Scotland
Preceded by John Lyon-Bowes	Earl of Strathmore and Kinghorne; 3 July 1820 – 27 August 1846	Succeeded by Thomas Lyon-Bowes
