= Joseph Planta (librarian) =

British librarian (1744–1827)

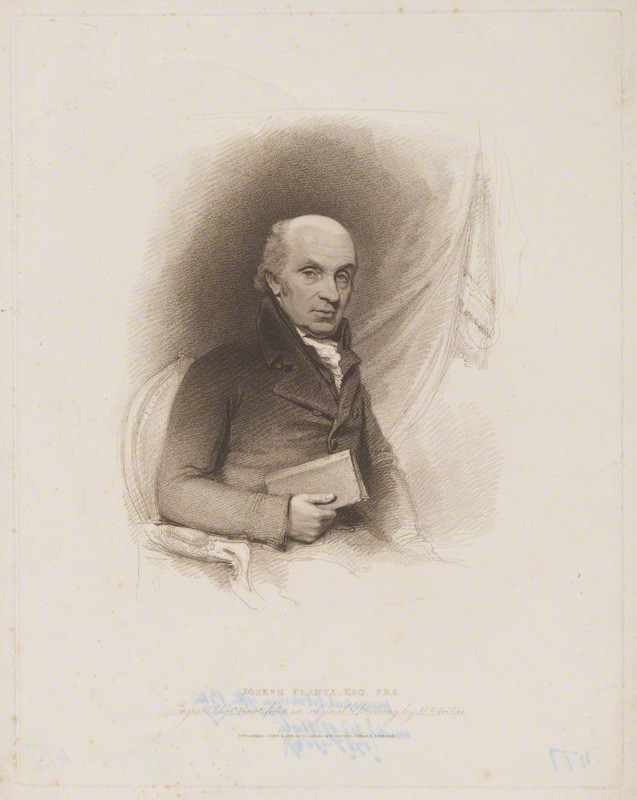
Planta in an 1812 illustration

Joseph Planta FRS (21 February 1744, Castasegna – 3 December 1827), aka Joseph von Planta, the Principal Librarian (i.e. Director) of the British Museum for the first quarter of the nineteenth century.

== Family background ==
Joseph Planta was born at Castasegna in Grisons, Switzerland, the son of Reverend Andrew (aka Andreas) Planta (1717–1773). The Plantas were of noble origin. The reverend, who was minister of a Swiss Reformed Church, moved his family to London in 1752, where he took up a position with a German church (of which there were already several). He was also appointed to the British Museum virtually from its inception, and worked there until his death in 1773. Joseph had five sisters, four of whom became governesses, including two – first Frederica and then Margaret (Peggy) – to the Royal Household of King George III and Queen Charlotte. His sisters Elizabeth and Eliza both worked for Mary Bowes, Countess of Strathmore and Kinghorne.

== Education and career ==
Joseph Planta studied philology at University of Utrecht and University of Göttingen. He served as secretary to the British minister (i.e. ambassador) at Brussels, who at that time was William Gordon. On the death of Andreas Planta, Joseph returned home to London, and immediately succeeded his father as assistant librarian at the British Museum. He was promoted to keeper of manuscripts in 1776 and then Principal Librarian, i.e. director, from 1799 until his death in 1827.

At the British Museum, Planta produced a library catalogue for the Cotton manuscripts. As Under Librarian, Planta organized the rehousing of the museum's coin collection. His time as Principal Librarian was a significant period in the history of the British Museum. He improved the facilities available for the public, recruited assistants to guide visitors (thus freeing the more senior staff), and improved pay.

Joseph Planta was elected a Fellow of the Royal Society in 1774. Soon afterwards Planta was appointed as an assistant at the British Museum, he published a paper on the Romansh language of the area of Switzerland in which he was born in the Philosophical Transactions of the Royal Society of London. The paper was read to the Royal Society on 10 November 1775. He was also appointed as one of the secretaries to the Royal Society in 1776.

== Marriage and children ==
Planta married Elizabeth Atwood (1744/5–1821) of the parish of St George's, Hanover Square, Westminster. They had a daughter, Sophia (born April 1779) and a son, Sir Joseph Planta (1787–1847), MP for Hastings.
