= John Bowes, 10th Earl of Strathmore and Kinghorne =

Scottish Earl

The Right Honourable The Earl of Strathmore and Kinghorne
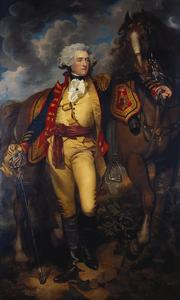
- John Bowes, 10th Earl of Strathmore and Kinghorne
- Born: 14 April 1769
- Died: 3 July 1820 (aged 51)
- Title: 10th Earl of Strathmore and Kinghorne
- Spouse: Mary Milner
- Children: John Bowes
- Parent(s): John Bowes, 9th Earl of Strathmore and Kinghorne; Mary Bowes, Countess of Strathmore and Kinghorne

John Bowes, 10th Earl of Strathmore and Kinghorne (14 April 1769 – 3 July 1820) was a Scottish nobleman and peer. He was the eldest son of John Bowes, 9th Earl of Strathmore and Kinghorne and Mary Bowes, Countess of Strathmore and Kinghorne. He lived mainly on his estates in Durham.

== Career ==
He succeeded his father as Earl of Strathmore and Kinghorne when the latter died at sea on 7 March 1776.

From 30 June 1796 to 24 October 1806 and again from 9 June 1807 to 29 September 1812, he sat as a Scottish representative peer in the House of Lords.

== Family and legacy ==
He had a long affair with the commoner Mary Milner, the beautiful daughter of a gardener; according to some versions (notably offered by Augustus Hare) he went through a false ceremony of marriage with her. They had one son:

- John Bowes (1811–1885), known as Lord Glamis from birth until 1820, and sent to Eton under that name.

The Earl was created Baron Bowes in 1815 and held this as a subsidiary title to his death.

He married Mary on 2 July 1820, a mere day before his death. He attempted to legitimise his son by this marriage and his will named his son as his heir. According to his will (dated 3 July 1817), all his real estate were left to Mary and five other trustees in name of his son. The trustees were also required to pay Mary £1,000 p.a for life.

But this deathbed marriage did not prevent his primary title from being inherited by his younger brother Thomas Lyon-Bowes, 11th Earl of Strathmore and Kinghorne. The Scottish courts agreed that by marrying Mary, John had been legitimised under Scottish law, but since both parties (notably the father) were domiciled in England, English law would prevail. And Scottish law required Scottish domicile of the parents for the son to have been legitimated. It was on the point of domicile that John's legitimation failed.

A bitter court case followed over the terms of the Earl's will, and after five years, it was decided that the Earl's son John would inherit his English estates, including Gibside, Streatlam Castle and St Paul's Walden Bury, while his brother would inherit the Scottish estates. His secondary title as Baron Bowes became extinct.

Mary, now Dowager Countess of Strathmore, married in 1831 her son's tutor William Hutt, and died in 1860. Her son John Bowes married twice, but had no issue. He is best known today as the founder of the Bowes Museum. On his death, all his wealth and properties were inherited by the family of his uncle, reuniting the Scottish and English estates of the Bowes-Lyon family.

== Ancestry ==
Ancestors of John Bowes, 10th Earl of Strathmore and Kinghorne

8. John Lyon, 4th Earl of Strathmore and Kinghorne
4. Thomas Lyon, 8th Earl of Strathmore and Kinghorne
9. Lady Elizabeth Stanhope
2. John Bowes, 9th Earl of Strathmore and Kinghorne
10. James Nicholson
5. Jean Nicholson
11. Ann Allan
1. John Bowes, 10th Earl of Strathmore and Kinghorne
12. Sir William Bowes
6. Sir George Bowes
13. Elizabeth Blakiston
3. Mary Eleanor Bowes
14. Edward Gilbert
7. Mary Gilbert
15. Mary Neale

Peerage of Scotland
Preceded by John Bowes	Earl of Strathmore and Kinghorne; 1776–1820	Succeeded by Thomas Bowes-Lyon
Peerage of the United Kingdom
New creation	Baron Bowes; 1815–1820	Extinct
