= Matthew Duane =

Matthew Duane (1707–1785) was an English Roman Catholic conveyancer and art patron.

Of obscure family origins, by the 1730s Duane had established himself as a 'chamber counsel' and conveyancer in Newcastle and London. He married Dorothy Dawson in 1742. He became a member of Lincoln's Inn in 1748. Amongst his pupils were Lord Eldon and Charles Butler. Duane was a Fellow of the Royal Society and of the Society of Antiquaries, and a trustee of the British Museum, and had a reputation as a leading collector of coins and medals.
