= Catherine Shuvalova =

Russian courtier (1743–1817)

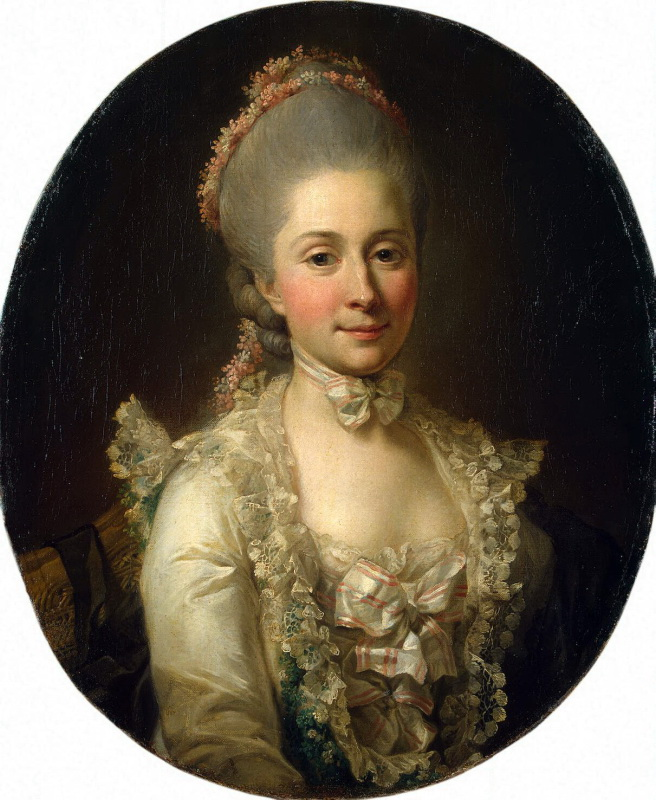
Portrait by Jens Juel, 1773–1774

Countess Catherine Shuvalova (Russian: Екатерина Петровна Шувалова, romanized: Yekaterina Petrovna Shuvalova; born Catherine Saltykova; 23 June 1743 – 13 October 1817), was a Russian courtier and lady-in-waiting at the court of Empress Catherine II. She was a confidant of Platon Zubov and Ober-Hofmeisterin of Grand Duchess Elizabeth Alexeievna (Louise of Baden).

== Biography ==
Catherine Saltykova was the daughter of Field Marshal Earl Pyotr Saltykov and his wife, Princess Praskovia Yuriyevna Trubetskaya. In 1762 Catherine married Count Andrei Petrovich Shuvalov (1743–1789) and soon after the wedding, her husband made a Grand Tour, which included, among other things, a visit to Voltaire in Ferney. After their return to Moscow, in 1766 Shuvalov settled in a house on Butcher Street, where in 1767 he was awarded the visit of the empress Catherine.

Thanks to her favor Countess Catherine Petrovna took a prominent position at the court. "Cancelled amiable in a simple and a friendly community," according to Prince Dolgoruky, Shuvalov was holding an open house, "where science, art, poetry, theater and all captivating the imagination, abducted first place in the conversation, activities and amusements." Shuvalova assimilated the Deism of her husband, a fervent devotee of Voltaire, and Countess' doctrines last enjoyed in life to justify their weakness, and in this spirit that brought their daughters.

In 1776 Shuvalovs again went abroad and settled in Paris. "Shuvalov travels to many, but to her, no one, consequently, is not familiar to everyone nicely," - wrote at the time Denis Fonvizin. Madame du Deffand calls her a woman intolerably boring, though polite. In 1781, Shuvalova returned to Saint Petersburg and at 8 years old widowed. Staying at the court in 1792, she was made lady-in-waiting, and in the same year, Empress requested it, as experienced in foreign travel, to bring to Saint Petersburg young princesses of Baden-Durlach, one of which was intended bride Grand Duke Alexander Pavlovich, future Alexander I of Russia.

Shuvalov fulfill its mandate very skillfully, went abroad under the pretext of going to the Aachen water, and returning with the princesses in Russia, the day of the engagement of the Grand Duchess Elizabeth Alexeievna was appointed to consist in her Lady-in-waiting of the Imperial Court of Russia. In this field, so Shuvalov has shown its penchant for intrigue, which antagonized the grand courtyard and was nicknamed la Grande clabaudeuse ("great zlopyhatelnitsa"). Disliking the Grand Duke, she tried hard to settle discord between the young couple, all pleasing to the Grand Duchess and her constantly pointing out the mistakes of her husband. The result of this behavior it was unanimous and strong condemnation of all others. Grand Duke Alexander Shuvalov hated, but his father Paul I of Russia made no secret of his contempt for her. According to Varvara Golovina, to strengthen its position Shuvalova was trying to flatter the prince Zubov, becoming the "main confidante of his senses.

On his accession to the throne of Emperor Paul eliminated her from the post of the lady-in-waiting, but on the day of the coronation in 1797 gave to her the Order of Saint Catherine the second degree and two years only made the tape. Soon after that she was allowed to go abroad.

== Conversion to Roman Catholicism ==
In 1807, Catherine and her daughter Alexandra, supported by the House of Dietrichstein, converted themselves to Roman Catholicism from Russian Orthodoxy. She resided in Rome in the palace on the Via della Scrofa, which the Romans called the Palazzo Golitsyn.

== Death ==
Catherine Shuvalova died on 13 October 1817. Her body was transported to Saint Petersburg and was buried in the Alexander Nevsky Lavra.

== Children ==
Praskovya Andreevna (1767-1828), writer, was married to Mikhail Andreyevich Galitzine (1765-1812).

Peter (1771-1808), Adjutant General of the Emperor Paul I. He was married to Princess Sophia Scherbatova (1776-1849), had two daughters and two sons, their grandsons Peter and Paul A. Shuvalov.

Alexandra Andreevna (1775-1847), was married since 1797 to Prince Franz Joseph von Dietrichstein (1767-1854).

Paul (1776-1823), Adjutant General of the Emperor Alexander I. He was married from 1815 to Princess Varvara Petrovna Shakhovskoy (1796-1870), had two sons.

== Sources ==
- Fyodor Rostopchin wrote in 1793: "The Countess Shuvalov woman extremely cunning, loyal gossip, coquetry and unabashed in his speeches. Instead of correcting and teaching the Grand Duke with gentleness, she puts on the kind of all its flaws and has made that the Grand Duke and Grand Duchess young hated her. " See: Letter to C. F. Rostopchina Vorontsov / Archive Vorontsov. - T. 8. - M., 1876. - P. 75.
- V. Golovin memories. - Moscow: Zakharov, 2006. - 350 p. ISBN 5-8159-0639-5.
