= Mary Bowes, Countess of Strathmore and Kinghorne =

British noblewoman

Mary Eleanor Bowes
- Countess of Strathmore and Kinghorne
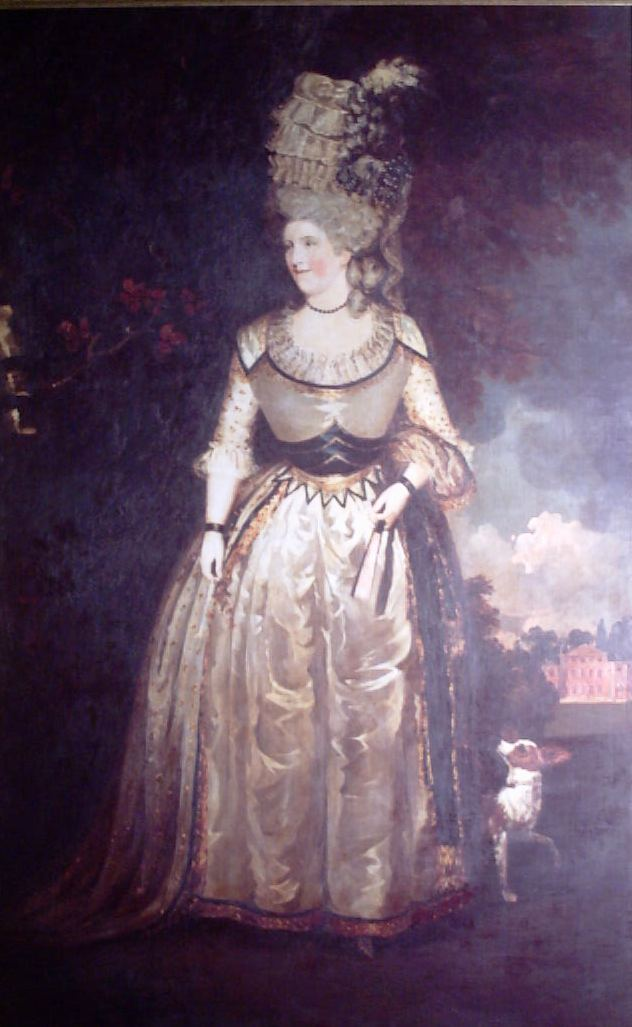
- Reign: 24 February 1767 – 7 March 1776
- Born: Mary Eleanor Bowes; 24 February 1749; Mayfair, London, Kingdom of Great Britain
- Died: 28 April 1800 (aged 51); Christchurch, Hampshire, Kingdom of Great Britain
- Buried: Westminster Abbey, London, England; 51°29′58″N 00°07′39″W
- Noble family: Bowes; Lyon
- Spouses: John Bowes, 9th Earl of Strathmore and Kinghorne (m. 1767; died 1776) Andrew Robinson Stoney (m. 1777; div. 1789)
- Issue: Lady Maria Jane Bowes-Lyon; John Bowes, 10th Earl of Strathmore and Kinghorne; Lady Anna Maria Bowes-Lyon; George Bowes-Lyon; Thomas Lyon-Bowes, 11th Earl of Strathmore and Kinghorne; Mary Bowes; William Johnstone Bowes
- Father: George Bowes
- Mother: Mary Gilbert

Mary Eleanor Bowes, Countess of Strathmore and Kinghorne (24 February 1749 – 28 April 1800) was a notable member of the British aristocracy during the Georgian period in the 18th century.

Referred to by some as "The Unhappy Countess", she was a prominent heiress, who inherited a vast fortune. Her husbands were John Bowes, born John Lyon, the 9th Earl of Strathmore and Kinghorne and Anglo-Irishman Andrew Robinson Stoney, the latter of whom treated her very cruelly during their marriage. Amongst many other achievements in her life, including a significant expertise developed in the field of botany, Mary Eleanor Bowes was one of the early pioneers of women's rights in relation to divorce.

== Early life ==
Mary was born in Upper Brook Street in Mayfair, London, the daughter and heiress of Sir George Bowes, a wealthy businessman; and his second wife, Mary Gilbert of St Paul's Walden. She was named Mary Eleanor in homage to both her own mother and her father's beloved first wife, Eleanor Verney, who died in 1724. From 1757, Elizabeth Planta worked as her governess, while her father Andrew Planta was engaged as French teacher.

Mary's childhood home was at Gibside, in County Durham. Bowes died when Mary was 11 years old, and left her a vast fortune (estimated at between £600,000 and £1.04 million), which he had built up through membership of the Grand Allies, a cartel of coal-mine owners. At a stroke, Mary became the wealthiest heiress in Britain, perhaps in all of Europe. She encouraged the attentions of Campbell Scott, younger brother of the Duke of Buccleuch as well as of John Stuart, the self-styled Lord Mountstuart, eldest son of Lord Bute (the Prime Minister), before becoming engaged at the age of 16 to John Lyon, the 9th Earl of Strathmore and Kinghorne.

== First marriage ==
Mary married the 9th Earl of Strathmore on her 18th birthday, 24 February 1767. Since her father's will stipulated that her husband should assume his family name, the Earl addressed Parliament with a request to change his name from John Lyon to John Bowes, which was granted. However, some of the couple's children chose to use a surname that hyphenated their parents' names, styling themselves Lyon-Bowes. Five children were born to the Earl and Countess within the first six years of marriage, being:

- Maria Jane Lyon-Bowes (21 April 1768 – 22 April 1806), married Colonel Barrington Price of the British Army in 1789
- John Bowes, 10th Earl of Strathmore and Kinghorne (14 April 1769 – 3 July 1820), married in 1820 Mary Milner, his long-term mistress and the mother of his son, on the day before he died
- Anna Maria Bowes (3 June 1770 – 29 March 1832), eloped and married Henry Jessop in 1788; returned shortly afterwards to live with her mother
- George Bowes (17 November 1771 – 3 December 1806), married Mary Thornhill
- Thomas Lyon-Bowes, 11th Earl of Strathmore and Kinghorne (3 May 1773 – 27 August 1846) married Mary Elizabeth Louisa Rodney Carpenter, whose mother was the daughter of a mason.

Thanks to the countess's fortune, the couple lived extravagantly. While the Earl spent much of his time restoring his family seat, Glamis Castle, the countess self-published a poetical drama entitled The Siege of Jerusalem in 1769, which remained her only literary effort, although she maintained remarkably candid diaries for much of her life. She also professed interest in botany and financed an expedition by the explorer William Paterson to the Cape in 1777 to collect plants for her.

A few years into the marriage, the Earl contracted tuberculosis and his health weakened. Dissatisfied with her husband's increasing lack of robustness and alleged inattention, the countess took lovers to entertain herself. On 7 March 1776, Lord Strathmore died at sea on his way to Portugal, of tuberculosis.

== Between marriages ==
The couple's combined extravagance meant that the countess was left with debts totalling £145,000 upon the Earl's death. While the sum was staggering, her fortune far exceeded the figure and she had little trouble discharging these debts. As a widow, she also regained control of her fortune, centred on the mines and farms around her childhood home of Gibside in County Durham.

At the time of the Earl's death, the countess was pregnant by a lover, George Gray. Born in Calcutta in 1737, where his father had worked as a surgeon for the East India Company, Gray was a Scottish "nabob" who had made and squandered a small fortune working for the same company. He had returned to England under a cloud in 1766 after squandering both his own fortune and a considerable inheritance. Samuel Foote's play The Nabob is believed to have been inspired by Gray, who was also a friend of James Boswell.

Despite the pregnancy, the dowager countess was loath to marry Gray, since her loss of rank would be considerable and since Gray's fortune had been squandered anyway. She successfully induced an abortion by drinking "a black inky kind of medicine". However, she continued the affair with Gray and became pregnant repeatedly, undergoing two further abortions. Her candid account of these abortions is one of very few available first-person descriptions of secret abortions in the era before legalised abortion. When she found herself pregnant by Gray a fourth time, the dowager countess resigned herself to marrying him and they became formally engaged to marry. This was in 1776.

However, that same summer of 1776, the dowager countess was seduced by a charming and wily Anglo-Irish adventurer, Andrew Robinson Stoney, who manipulated his way into her household after squandering the inheritance from his first wife, Hannah Newton, (using the governess of the children, Eliza Planta) and into her bed. Calling himself "Captain" Stoney (although in reality, he was a mere lieutenant in the British Army) he insisted on fighting a duel in the dowager countess's honour with the editor of The Morning Post, a newspaper which had published scurrilous articles about her private life. In fact, Stoney had himself written the articles both criticising and defending the countess. He now faked a duel with the editor, the Reverend Sir Henry Bate Dudley, to appeal to Mary's romantic nature. Pretending to be mortally wounded, Stoney begged the dowager countess to grant his dying wish: to marry her. Taken in by the ruse, she agreed.

== Second marriage ==
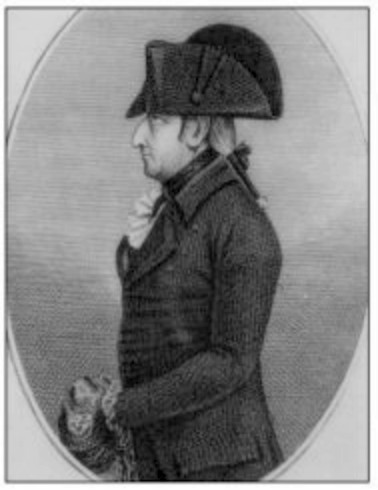
Andrew Robinson Stoney

Stoney was carried on a stretcher down the aisle of St James's Church, Piccadilly, where he married Mary. Shortly afterwards, he staged a remarkable recovery. In compliance with Mary's father's will, Stoney changed his name to Bowes. Two children were born to Mary during the term of this marriage:

- Mary Bowes, who was probably the daughter of George Gray, was delivered secretly in August 1777, but her birthday was registered as 14 November 1777;
- William Johnstone Bowes was born on 8 March 1782.

After the wedding, Stoney Bowes attempted to take control of his wife's fortune, as was the custom of that era. When he discovered that Mary had secretly made a prenuptial agreement safeguarding the profits of her estate for her own use, he forced her to sign a revocation handing control to him. He is then alleged to have subjected Mary to eight years of physical and mental abuse, including confining her to her own house for a period. He later took Mary and her daughter Anna Maria (the Earl's daughter) off to Paris, whence they returned only after a writ had been served on him. He is also said to have raped the maids, invited prostitutes into the home and fathered numerous illegitimate children.

In 1785, with the help of loyal maids, Mary managed to escape Stoney's custody and filed for divorce through the ecclesiastical courts. Stoney Bowes then allegedly abducted Mary with the help of some accomplices and carried her off to the north country. She later alleged that he threatened to rape and kill her, that he gagged and beat her and carried her around the countryside on horseback in one of the coldest spells of an unusually cold winter. The country was alerted; Stoney Bowes was eventually arrested, and Mary rescued.

The divorce case continued with additional legal battles regarding these incidents. The trials were sensational and the talk of London. Although Mary initially won public sympathy with her tales and tears, the tide soon turned against her as her own licentiousness of character became known. Even during the pendency of the case, Mary had an affair with the brother of one of her lawyers, which became public knowledge; an affair with her footman, George Walker, was also alleged. Stoney made known other salacious details of Mary's past excesses and ensured the publication of the 'confessions' that she had earlier made in writing to him – he even purchased shares in a newspaper to publish these memoirs. There was also a general feeling that Mary had behaved badly in attempting to prevent her husband's access to her fortune.

Stoney Bowes and his accomplices were found guilty of conspiracy to abduct Mary and he was sentenced to three years in prison. Meanwhile, the divorce case reached the trial stage at the High Court of Delegates. In an interim judgment, Stoney lost the battle to retain control of the Bowes fortune during the pendency of the case. The divorce case itself remained pending until Mary died in 1800, at which point it became infructuous. Stoney Bowes was released from prison upon Mary's death, and unsuccessfully attempted to have her will invalidated. After he lost that case, he was sued by his own lawyers for their expenses. Unable to pay these debts, he came under prison jurisdiction (in that era, bankruptcy was punished with prison), although he lived outside the prison walls with his mistress, Mary 'Polly' Sutton. He died on 16 June 1810.

In 1841, the novelist William Makepeace Thackeray heard Bowes's life story from the Countess's grandson, John Bowes, and used it in his novel The Luck of Barry Lyndon.

== Retirement and death ==
After 1792, Mary lived quietly in Purbrook Park in Hampshire. She later moved to Stourfield House, an isolated mansion on the edge of the village of Pokesdown near Christchurch, Hampshire, where she could live feeling that she was "...out of the world.." She brought to Stourfield a full establishment of servants, including Mary Morgan, the maid who had helped her escape her marital home. Morgan died in 1796 and was buried beneath a brass plaque composed by Mary. Following this death, Mary did not socialise at all, but spent most of her time looking after pet animals, including a large number of dogs, for whom hot dinners were cooked daily. Local people found her very strange, if not actually mad. However, she occasionally tried to reach out to them, ordering dinners cooked for the men working in the fields, and having beer sent out to refresh them. Details of Mary's life at Stourfield House have been preserved in the transcribed memoirs of an elderly Pokesdown resident.

Mary's three sons by the Earl seldom visited their mother, and never stayed long. However, two of Mary's daughters lived with her – Lady Anna Maria Jessop, the Earl's daughter; and Mary Bowes, who was born during the term of Mary's second marriage. One of Mary's few joys was to see her daughter Mary learning to ride – at this time, riding brought great independence; journey times were about a third that of going by coach.

Towards the close of the century, Mary called in some trusted friends from Pokesdown village to witness her final will, and began making presents of dresses and other items to the community. She also left an annuity for the widow Lockyer of Pokesdown Farm.

Mary died on 28 April 1800. Undertakers came from London with a hearse and three mourning carriages and transported her body to London. Mary was buried in Westminster Abbey, where her tombstone stands in the Poets' Corner. According to the locals, she was buried as per her request in a court dress, with all the accessories necessary for a Royal audience, plus a small silver trumpet. Other reports have it that she was buried in a bridal dress. Soon after her death, the contents of Stourfield House were sold.

Mary Eleanor Bowes was the great-great-great-grandmother of Lady Elizabeth Bowes-Lyon, the late Queen Mother.

== Archives ==
A collection of records "concerning the life and adventures of Mary Eleanor Bowes" is held by the University of Dundee. They include a letter to her from her first husband "enumerating her faults", which was written on his death bed.

== Sources ==
- Moore, Wendy (2009). Wedlock: The True Story of the Disastrous Marriage and Remarkable Divorce of Mary Eleanor Bowes, Countess of Strathmore. New York: Three Rivers Press.
