= Flora Fraser (writer) =

British writer of historical biographies

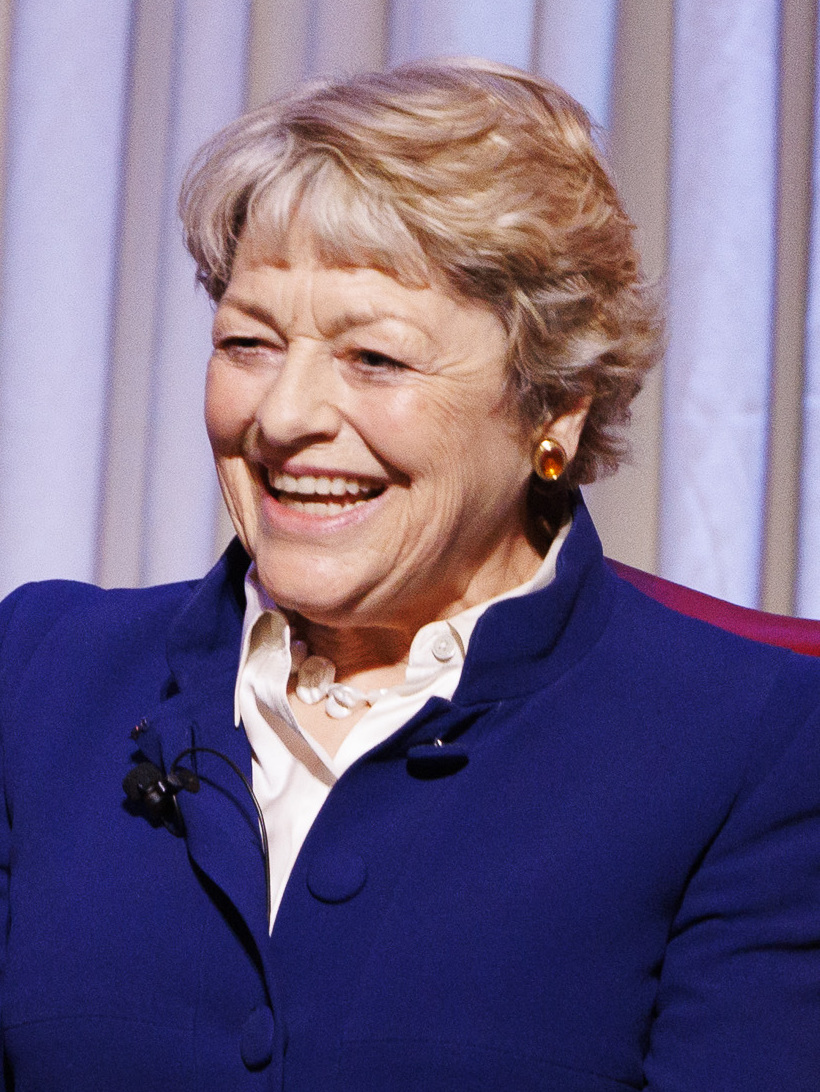
- Fraser in 2025
- Born: Flora Elizabeth Fraser; 30 October 1958 (age 67); London, England
- Other name: Flora Fraser Soros
- Education: Holland Park School; Wadham College, Oxford
- Occupation: Writer
- Spouses: Robert Powell-Jones (m. 1980; died 1998) Peter Soros (m. 1997; sep. 2009)
- Children: 3
- Parents: Sir Hugh Fraser (father); Lady Antonia Pakenham (mother)

Flora Elizabeth Fraser Soros (born 30 October 1958) is an English writer of historical biographies.

== Family ==
She is a daughter of historian and historical biographer Lady Antonia Fraser and Sir Hugh Fraser, a British Conservative politician. Her mother is of English descent while her father was Scottish. Her stepfather was the playwright Harold Pinter, the 2005 Nobel Laureate in Literature, her mother's second husband until his death in 2008. Her maternal grandparents were Elizabeth Longford, also an eminent biographer, and Lord Longford, a well-known politician, social reformer, and author.

She was named for the Scottish Jacobite Flora MacDonald. Using her maiden name Flora Fraser, she has written biographies of Emma Hamilton, Caroline of Brunswick, the daughters of George III, and Pauline Bonaparte.

== Education ==
Fraser attended Holland Park School for one year before joining her elder sister Rebecca at St Paul's Girls' School. She then read Classics at Wadham College, Oxford.

== Personal life ==
Fraser married Robert Powell-Jones at the age of 21, with whom she had a daughter. Powell-Jones died of a heart attack in 1998, aged 44. She later married Peter Soros, a nephew of American currency speculator and philanthropist George Soros, with whom she has two children. Fraser and Soros separated in 2009. Fraser lives in London.

== Published works ==
- Beloved Emma: The Life of Emma, Lady Hamilton (1986)
- The Unruly Queen: The Life of Queen Caroline (1996)
- Princesses: The Six Daughters of George III (2004)
- Venus of Empire: The Life of Pauline Bonaparte (2009)
- The Washingtons (2015)
