= John Bowes, 9th Earl of Strathmore and Kinghorne =

Scottish nobleman

The Right Honourable The Earl of Strathmore and Kinghorne
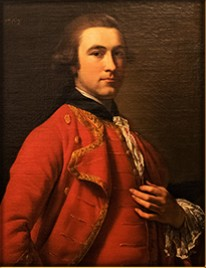
- The 9th Earl
- Born: 17 July 1737; Durham, County Durham, England
- Died: 7 March 1776 (aged 38); At sea
- Title: 9th Earl of Strathmore and Kinghorne
- Spouse: Mary Bowes (m. 1767)
- Children: Lady Maria Price; John Bowes, 10th Earl of Strathmore and Kinghorne; Lady Anna Maria Lyon; Hon. George Bowes-Lyon; Thomas Lyon-Bowes, 11th Earl of Strathmore and Kinghorne
- Parent(s): Thomas Lyon, 8th Earl of Strathmore and Kinghorne; Jean Nicholson

John Bowes, 9th Earl of Strathmore and Kinghorne (17 July 1737 – 7 March 1776), born John Lyon, was a Scottish nobleman and peer. He was the 9th Earl of Strathmore and Kinghorne and one of the maternal ancestors of King Charles III.

The Earl was famous for his appearance; he was known as "the beautiful Lord Strathmore". His character was later described by Jesse Foot thus:

"The late Earl of Strathmore was not calculated to make even a good learned woman a pleasing husband. His Lordship's pursuits were always innocent and without the smallest guile, but they were not those of science or any other splendid quality. A sincere friend, a hearty Scotchman and a good bottle companion were points of his character."

== Biography ==
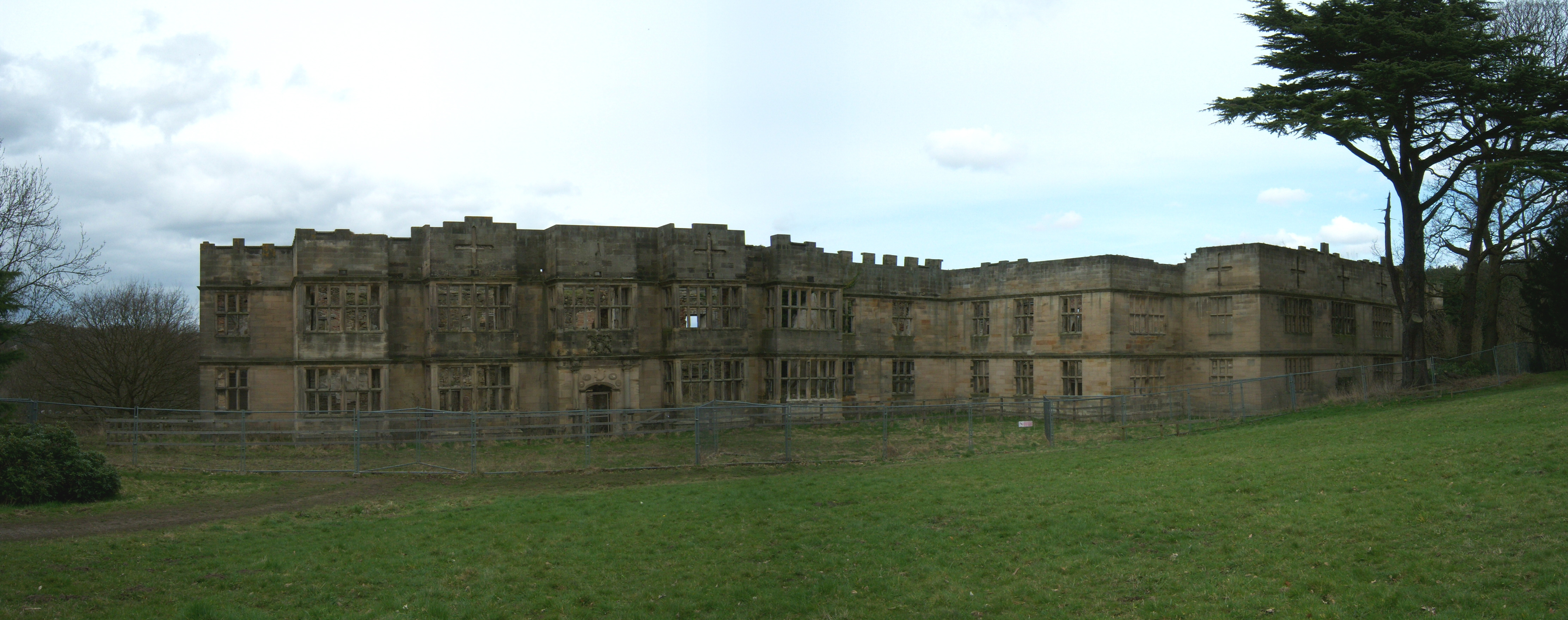
The shell of Gibside Hall, County Durham

The Earl was the son of Thomas Lyon, 8th Earl of Strathmore and Kinghorne, and his wife, the former Jean Nicholson. In 1760 he took the Grand Tour of Europe, accompanied for the first several months by his college classmate Thomas Pitt, later the Baron Camelford. From March 1761 until he returned to England in June 1763 he had an affair with Costanza Scotti, Contessa Sanvitale.

On 24 February 1767, at St George's Hanover Square Church he married the heiress Mary Eleanor Bowes, who was already possessed of her late father's estates such as Gibside. As per the stipulations of the will of the father of the bride, he assumed his wife's name of Bowes, a fairly common arrangement among the propertied classes that required an Act of Parliament.

The two had five children:

- Lady Maria Jane Lyon (21 April 1768 – 22 April 1806); married Barrington Price, a Colonel of the British Army, on 11 May 1789. Had issue.
- John Lyon-Bowes, 10th Earl of Strathmore and Kinghorne (14 April 1769 – 3 July 1820)
- Lady Anna Maria Lyon (3 June 1770 – 29 March 1832) married Henry James Jessup and had issue.
- Hon. George Bowes-Lyon (17 November 1771 – 26 December 1806); married Mary Thornhill.
- Thomas Bowes-Lyon, 11th Earl of Strathmore and Kinghorne (3 May 1773 – 27 August 1846)

From 1 October 1767 and until his death, he sat as a Scottish representative peer in the House of Lords. On 7 March 1776, Lord Strathmore died of tuberculosis whilst at sea on his way to Portugal and was succeeded in turn by his sons, John and Thomas.

== See also ==
- List of Scottish representative peers

Peerage of Scotland
Preceded by Thomas Lyon	Earl of Strathmore and Kinghorne; 1753–1776	Succeeded by John Lyon-Bowes
