= Wendy Moore =

English journalist, author and historian

- Born: 4 March 1958 (age 68)
- Education: Harlow College
- Occupations: Historian and author
- Writing career
- Language: English
- Genres: History of England; History of medicine
- Notable works: The Knife Man, Wedlock, How to Create the Perfect Wife
- Notable awards: Medical Journalists Association Open Book Award 2005; Channel 4 TV Book Club pick
- Website: wendymoore.org

Wendy Moore is an English journalist, author, and historian. She has produced works on the English nobility, social history and the history of medicine. Her first work, The Knife Man, was adapted as a TV pilot by AMC but did not go further. Her second book, Wedlock, is currently being optioned for TV.

== Career ==
Moore graduated from Harlow College (then Harlow Technical College), and took her first job at a newspaper at 19 in Buckinghamshire. She later became a crime reporter, investigating incidents such as the Dennis Nilsen murders, as well as a health reporter.

=== Health and medical writing ===
Her work in researching medical topics soon interested her in the health field as well as the history of medicine; she dedicated the rest of her career to writing about medical topics. Moore became the news editor of Health Service Journal, a publication produced by the British National Health Service. In 1991, she left the Journal to become a freelance journalist, producing works for The Times, The Guardian, The Observer, and the Sunday Telegraph. She also contributed her writings to the British Medical Journal and History Today.

In 1999, Moore earned a diploma in the history of medicine from the Society of Apothecaries and received the Maccabean prize for best dissertation. Her biography of 18th-century Scottish surgeon John Hunter was published as her first book, The Knife Man, in 2005. The book received positive reviews and was awarded the 2005 Medical Journalists Open Book Award. As of 2012, The Knife Man was being adapted by A History of Violence director David Cronenberg as his first television credit.

As well as telling Mary Eleanor’s remarkable story I had to bone up on 18th century law, botany, crime and domestic violence. I visited Scotland seven times to view the Strathmore archives, and Durham several times to see the Bowes family papers, as well as making countless visits to the British Library.

— Wendy Moore on her second book, Wedlock

=== Wedlock ===
Wedlock, her second book, was published in 2009, and detailed the abusive second marriage of Mary Eleanor Bowes, Countess of Strathmore. Bowes' second husband, an Irish soldier who conned her into matrimony and then pursued her after their separation, is said to have inspired Thackeray's The Luck of Barry Lyndon. The Washington Post columnist Jonathan Yardley stated that Moore "writes lively and literate prose... She has done a heroic amount of research, bringing her characters to life with singular verisimilitude and portraying 18th-century courtship and marriage in full detail, never forgetting that although Mary Eleanor Bowes was uncommonly privileged and wealthy, at root her lot was that of every other woman of her day." Describing the book as "meticulously researched", The Guardian's Katie Toms believed it was "ripe for film adaptation." Wedlock was also reviewed by The Independent, The Daily Telegraph, and The New York Times, among others. The book was featured on Channel 4's book club in 2010, and received a sales boost.

=== How to Create the Perfect Wife ===
Her subsequent book, published by Orion in 2013, was How to Create the Perfect Wife. It details the life of Sabrina Sidney, a girl who is said to have inspired the storyline of My Fair Lady. It was described in one review as 'bringing together painstaking research with gripping storytelling.'

== Personal life ==
Moore was born in Derbyshire. She lives in southeast London with her journalist husband and two children.

She has cited The Lion, the Witch and the Wardrobe as the biggest literary influence on her as a child. She has also read Philip Pullman's Northern Lights trilogy. Moore is a fan of historical fiction, and lists Jean Plaidy's Madonna of the Seven Hills as one of the first books she purchased.

== Works ==
- Endell Street: The Women Who Ran Britain’s Trailblazing Military Hospital (Atlantic Books, 2020) - BBC Radio 4 Book of the Week in 2020
- The Mesmerist: The Society Doctor Who Held Victorian London Spellbound (W&N, 2017)
- How to Create the Perfect Wife. Hachette UK. 2013. ISBN 978-0297863793.
- Wedlock: The true story of the disastrous marriage and remarkable divorce of Mary Eleanor Bowes, Countess of Strathmore. Crown Publishing Group. 2010. ISBN 978-0307383372. (US) or Wedlock: How Georgian Britain's worst husband met his match. Orion Publishing Group. 2009. ISBN 978-0297857587. (UK)
- The Knife Man: The extraordinary life and times of John Hunter, father of modern surgery. Bantam Press. 2005. ISBN 0593052099.
