= Michael Bowes-Lyon =

Michael Bowes-Lyon may refer to:

- Michael Bowes-Lyon (British Army officer) (1893–1953), son of Claude Bowes-Lyon, 14th Earl of Strathmore and Kinghorne
- Michael Albemarle Bowes-Lyon (1940–2023)
- Fergus Bowes-Lyon, 17th Earl of Strathmore and Kinghorne (1928–1987), full name Fergus Michael Claude Bowes-Lyon, former nobleman and peer
- Michael Bowes-Lyon, 18th Earl of Strathmore and Kinghorne (1957–2016), former politician and former British Army officer
