= Death and funeral of Queen Elizabeth the Queen Mother =

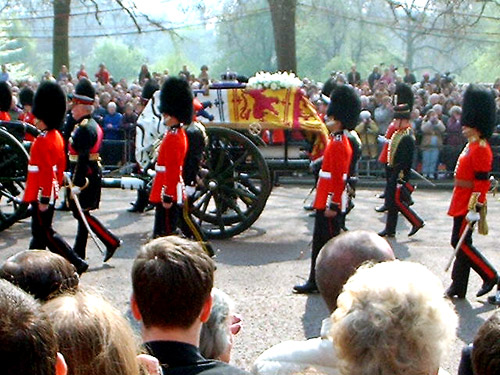
- The Queen Mother's carriage, surmounted by her crown, adorned with camellias from her own gardens and draped in her personal standard, travels down to Westminster Abbey.
- Date: 30 March 2002, at 15:15 (GMT) (date of death); 9 April 2002, 9:48–13:50 (BST) (date of ceremonial funeral)
- Location: Royal Lodge, Windsor, Berkshire (place of death) Westminster Hall, London (lying in state) Westminster Abbey, London (funeral ceremony) King George VI Memorial Chapel, St George's Chapel, Windsor Castle (resting place)
- Participants: See list

On 30 March 2002 at 15:15 GMT, Queen Elizabeth the Queen Mother (formerly Lady Elizabeth Bowes-Lyon), widow to King George VI and mother to Queen Elizabeth II, died at the age of 101 at Royal Lodge, Windsor. The death of the Queen Mother set in motion Operation Tay Bridge, a plan detailing procedures including the dissemination of information, national mourning, and her funeral. Representatives of nations and groups around the world sent condolences to Queen Elizabeth II, the British people, and Commonwealth citizens. Flowers and messages of condolence were left by the public at royal residences, with members of the British royal family publicly paying tribute to the Queen Mother in the days after her death. Her funeral, held on 9 April 2002 at Westminster Abbey in London, attracted 10 million viewers in the United Kingdom and cost £5.4 million.

== Background and death ==
The Queen Mother had developed a persistent cold which she caught during Christmas 2001. She was bedridden at Sandringham after her final public engagement on 22 November 2001, when she attended the recommissioning of HMS Ark Royal. However, despite missing many other scheduled events – such as the 100th birthday celebrations of Princess Alice, Duchess of Gloucester, on 12 December 2001; the annual luncheon of the Women's Institutes, of which she was president, on 23 January 2002, and traditional church services at Sandringham – she was determined to attend the funeral of her younger daughter Princess Margaret. On 13 February the Queen Mother slipped in her sitting room at Sandringham, causing considerable concern to her daughter, Queen Elizabeth II, and the rest of the royal family, but the Queen Mother travelled to Windsor by helicopter the following day.

The Queen Mother attended the funeral on 15 February in a people carrier with blacked-out windows, (which had recently been used by Margaret) shielded from the press according to her wishes so that no photographs of her in a wheelchair could be taken. She then returned to Royal Lodge in Windsor. On 5 March 2002 she attended lunch at the annual lawn party of the Eton Beagles, and watched the Cheltenham races on television; however, her health rapidly deteriorated during her last weeks after retreating to Royal Lodge for the final time. She died peacefully in her sleep at the Lodge on 30 March 2002, at the age of 101, with her surviving daughter, Elizabeth II, by her side.

== Reactions and aftermath ==
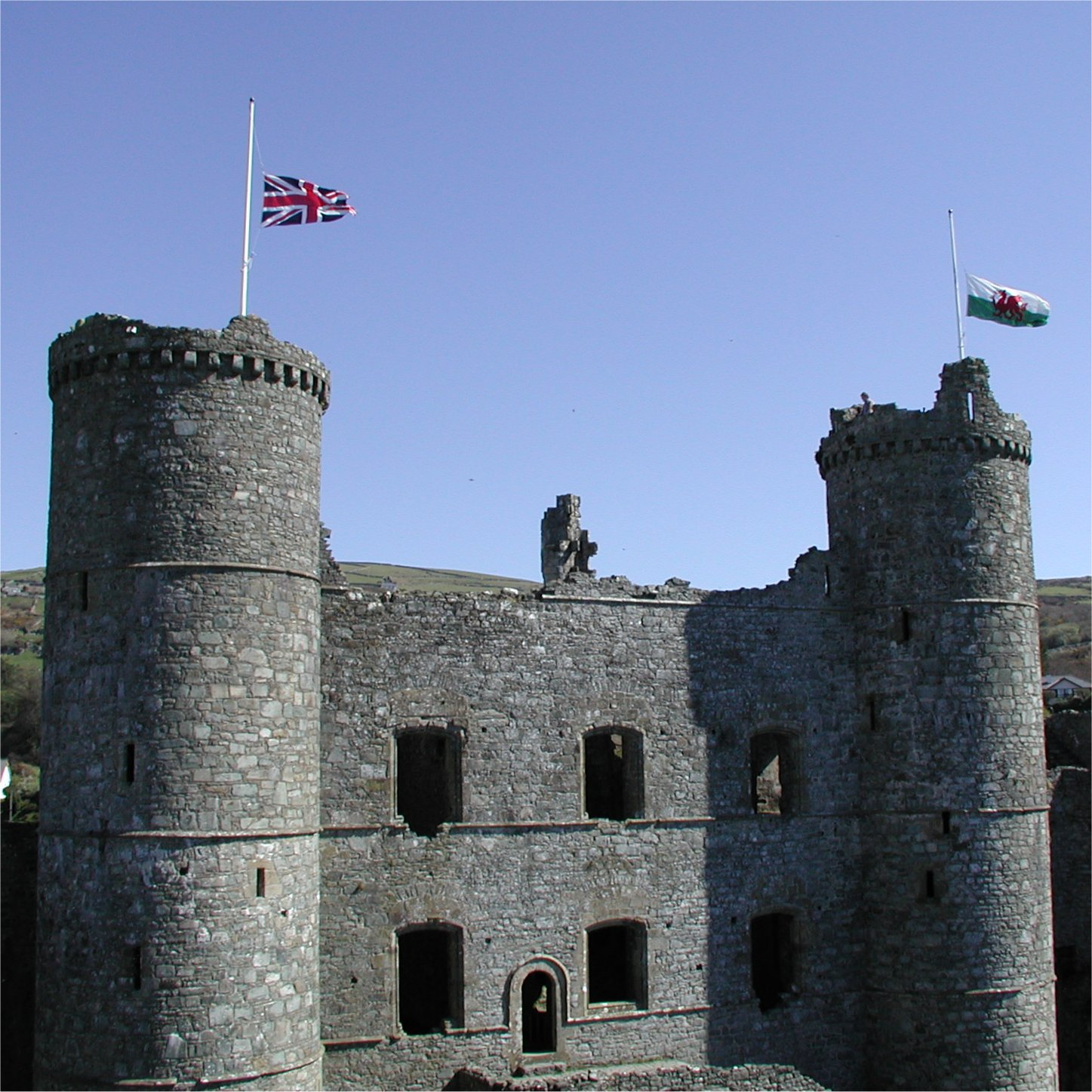
Flags flying at half mast at Harlech Castle, 8 April 2002

=== Royal family ===
Prince Charles and Prince Andrew, who were on holiday in Switzerland and Barbados respectively, rushed back to the UK upon learning about their grandmother's death. Her body lay at the altar of the Royal Chapel of All Saints near Royal Lodge, where the Queen and the royal family attended an evensong on the day after her death. Later, Prince Andrew and his daughters, Princesses Beatrice and Eugenie, met with members of the public. Prince Andrew described his grandmother as a "very, very special" person. In an interview, Princes William and Harry paid tribute to their "inspirational" great-grandmother. Both Elizabeth II and Prince Charles the Prince of Wales paid tribute to the Queen Mother in separate television broadcasts. On 4 April, Queen Elizabeth II and Prince Philip met the mourners at Windsor Castle and viewed the tributes.

=== Politicians and royalty ===
The prime minister Tony Blair and other MPs from the House of Commons, as well as the Leader of the House of Lords, Lord Williams of Mostyn, and the members of the House of Lords paid their tributes in separate statements. The Archbishop of Canterbury delivered a statement to the House of Lords, praising the Queen Mother for "her marvellous example of service and duty". In Scotland, the Scottish Parliament observed a one-minute silence. The Leader of the Opposition, the three first ministers of the constituent countries of the United Kingdom, and all living former British prime ministers expressed similar sentiments. Politicians within the Commonwealth of Nations who sent condolences includes the Australian Prime Minister John Howard and Canadian Prime Minister Jean Chrétien. The House of Commons of Canada also passed a parliamentary motion of condolence. Foreign politicians who sent messages of condolences were US President George W. Bush, Russian President Vladimir Putin, French President Jacques Chirac, South African President Thabo Mbeki, and Irish President Mary McAleese. Among heads of foreign royal houses who paid tributes were Juan Carlos I, the King of Spain, Carl XVI Gustaf, the King of Sweden, Abdullah II, the King of Jordan, and Gyanendra, the King of Nepal.

=== Public ===
On the BBC, Peter Sissons formally announced the death of the Queen Mother, although he created controversy and criticism from some newspapers as he wore a burgundy tie and not a black one, deemed more appropriate for such news. Sporting events in the UK observed a moment of silence as a mark of respect, though in the run-up to the funeral, the royal family and the government said they did not want sporting events to be delayed or cancelled. Members of the public were invited to sign books of condolence at St James's Palace, the Palace of Holyroodhouse, Windsor Castle, Sandringham House, Cardiff City Hall, and Belfast City Hall. Around 30,000 messages of condolence were submitted on the Palace's memorial website. Floral tributes and messages were left by the public at the gates of Buckingham Palace and other royal residences. Memorial services and prayers were held at churches across the UK, including the Easter service at Canterbury Cathedral led by the Archbishop of Canterbury George Carey, the Easter vigil at Westminster Cathedral led by Archbishop Cormac Murphy-O'Connor, and a special service of commemoration at St Paul's Cathedral. Similar services were held at St Mary Magdalene Church, Crathie Kirk, York Minster, and Manchester Cathedral, and a two-minute silence was observed by British and American troops deployed in Afghanistan during the Easter service in Bagram Airfield.

The flags on all public buildings in the UK were lowered to half-mast. Flags at Canadian federal buildings and establishments were also flown at half-mast from the announcement of her death until sunset the day of the funeral. The Irish National flag was also flown at half-mast on all State buildings to mark the death of the Queen Mother. Flags at Volgograd, a Russian city of which the Queen Mother was an honorary citizen, also flew half-mast after the announcement of her death and until the day of her funeral.

== Funeral ==
=== Lying in state ===
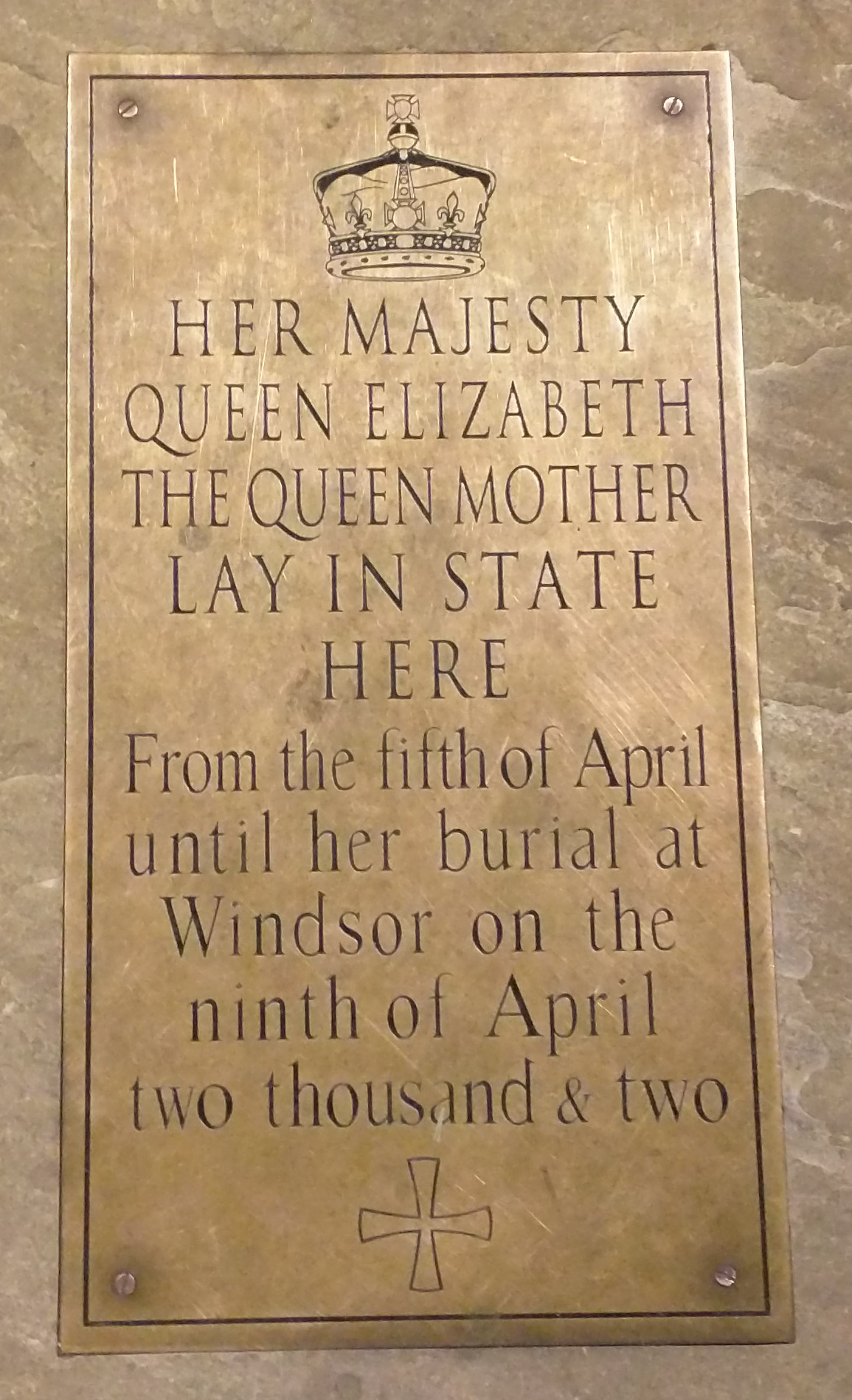
A plaque in Westminster Hall commemorating the lying in state

After being brought to London, the Queen Mother's coffin was initially placed at St James's Palace and later taken to Westminster Hall at the Palace of Westminster, accompanied by 1,600 troops, for her lying in state which began on 5 April. At one point, her four grandsons the Prince of Wales, Duke of York, Earl of Wessex and Viscount Linley mounted the guard as a mark of respect—an honour similar to the Vigil of the Princes at the lying in state of King George V. Prince Charles later returned for a private visit. The Welsh Guards and the Yeomen of the Guard also stood vigil over the Queen Mother's coffin. An estimated 200,000 members of the public filed past over three days. The queue of mourners stretched over a mile along the River Thames and over Lambeth Bridge, causing officials to extend the planned opening times.

=== Procession and service ===
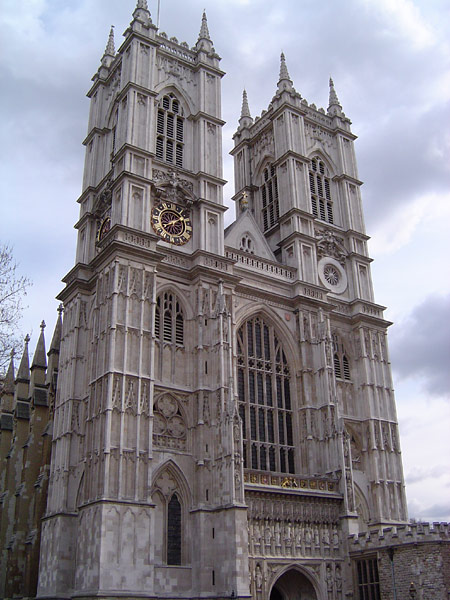
The West Door of Westminster Abbey, the venue of the Queen Mother's funeral.

The published order of service included as a preface the verse beginning "You can shed tears that she is gone" (attributed to an anonymous author) selected by Queen Elizabeth II. The verse became widely popular after the funeral, and was later revealed to be based on a poem written some 20 years earlier by David Harkins, an aspiring artist from Carlisle. Andrew Motion, who had previously written poems for the wedding of Prince Edward, the Queen Mother's 100th birthday, and the death of Princess Margaret, released an elegy in honour of the Queen Mother.

The funeral, code-named Operation Tay Bridge, was held in London. It started at 9:48 am on 9 April 2002, when the tenor bell of Westminster Abbey sounded 101 times, each chime representing a year that the Queen Mother had lived. At 11:18 am the coffin was carried from Westminster Hall in the Palace of Westminster where the Queen Mother's coffin – draped in her personal standard and with a wreath of flowers on top and her crown resting on a cushion – had been lying in state on a six-foot (1.8 m) catafalque. A note from the Queen was also placed on the coffin on the day of the funeral.

The coffin was then taken to the Abbey, about 300 metres away, accompanied by drummers and a massed pipe band of 192 musicians drawn from 13 British and Commonwealth regiments. Around 1,700 military personnel took part in the procession, and rehearsals lasted until the dawn of the funeral day. The Queen Mother's coffin was placed on a gun carriage led by the King's Troop, Royal Horse Artillery. Among the regiments that took part in the procession were 1st The Queen's Dragoon Guards, the Queen's Royal Hussars, the 9th/12th Royal Lancers, the King's Regiment, the Royal Anglian Regiment, The Light Infantry, the Black Watch, the Royal Army Medical Corps, the Royal Yeomanry, and the 68 (Inns of Court & City Yeomanry) Signal Squadron. Representatives from the Queen Mother's Canadian military units, the Black Watch (Royal Highland Regiment) of Canada, the Canadian Forces Medical Service, and the Toronto Scottish Regiment (Queen Elizabeth The Queen Mother's Own) also took part in the funeral procession.

The following members of the royal family followed the procession: the Duke of Edinburgh, the Prince of Wales, the Duke of York, the Princess Royal, the Earl of Wessex, Prince William, Prince Harry, Viscount Linley, Peter Phillips, Daniel Chatto, the Duke of Gloucester, the Duke of Kent, Prince Michael of Kent and Timothy Laurence. Also accompanying the royal family were members of the Bowes-Lyon family and some of her senior household staff. During the funeral the Union Flag flew at half mast over Buckingham Palace, and her own personal royal standard at Clarence House (the Queen Mother's official London residence since 1952). After the funeral, the Queen Mother's personal standard was lowered for the final time. Large crowds lined the streets of London to watch the procession. The Grenadier Guards served as the guard of honour and were placed opposite Westminster Hall.

The doors of Westminster Abbey were first opened at 9:45 am, and the first of the 2,200 guests arrived; most of the guests were in their seats by 10:30 am. Five minutes later, VIPs and heads of state began arriving via the Great West Door. At 10:40 am, the bearer party of the Irish Guards arrived at Westminster Hall, positioning themselves outside the North Door. A guard of honour was mounted by the Nijmegen Company of the Grenadier Guards, and the members of the royal family walking in the funeral procession arrived from Buckingham Palace and St James's Palace. Royalty who were not in the procession arrived at the Grand Entrance of Buckingham Palace.

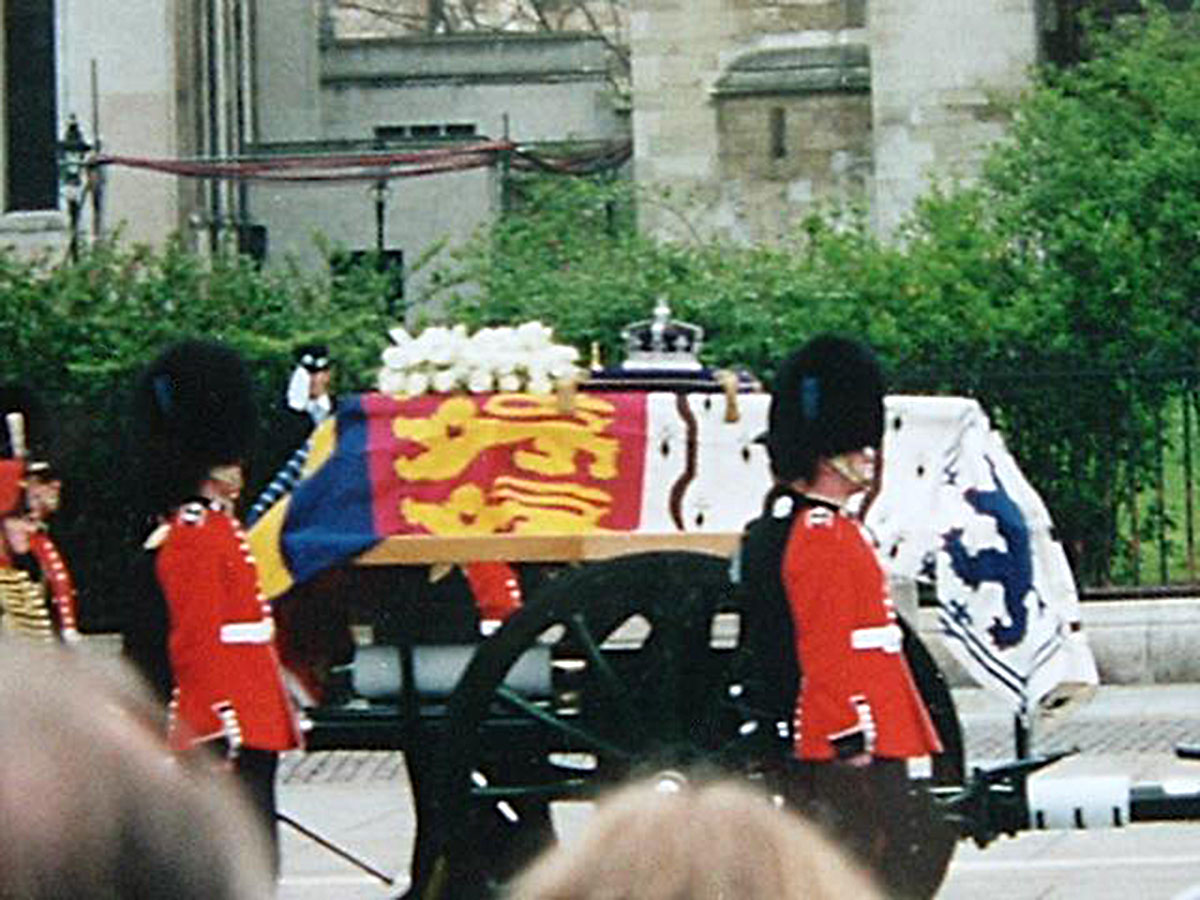
The Queen Mother's funeral carriage. The coffin is draped with her personal standard, shown below.

The procession lasted from 11:00 am until 11:16 am. Members of the royal family were chauffeured to the Abbey's Great West Door at 11:05 am to be received by the Dean of Westminster (Wesley Carr) and Chapter, and conducted to St. George's Chapel. Two minutes later, the visiting clergy participating in the service, such as the then Archbishop of Canterbury George Carey, processed along the centre aisle of the Abbey. The Queen left Buckingham Palace in the royal Rolls-Royce at 11:12 am, arriving with her entourage at the Great West Door four minutes later. She and others, including Lady Sarah and Daniel Chatto, Zara Phillips, Timothy Laurence, Viscountess Linley, Princess Beatrice and Princess Eugenie then walked down the Centre Aisle to their seats in the Lantern. The funeral service began after observing a nationwide two-minute silence at 11:30 am and lasted about 50 minutes.

The service was sung by the Choir of Westminster Abbey and conducted by Organist and Master of the Choristers, James O'Donnell; the organist was Andrew Reid. Music before the service included "Great Fantasia and Fugue in G minor, BWV 542", "Pièce d'orgue, BWV572", "Passacaglia in C minor, BWV582", and "Liebster Jesu, wir sind hier". The funeral started with the choir singing the Funeral Sentences, composed by William Croft and Henry Purcell. The first lesson from Ecclesiastes, chapter 12, verses 1–7, was read by Dr David Hope, the Archbishop of York, and the second lesson, from the Book of Revelation, chapter 7, verses 9–17, was read by Cardinal Cormac Murphy-O'Connor, the Archbishop of Westminster. The sermon was given by Dr George Carey, the Archbishop of Canterbury, and a reading from The Pilgrim's Progress was given by the Reverend Anthony Burnham, the Moderator of The Free Churches Group. The Psalm was Psalm 121, sung to a setting by William McKie. The hymns were Immortal, Invisible, God Only Wise; words by Walter Chalmers Smith to the traditional Welsh tune St Denio, and Guide me, O thou great Redeemer, by William Williams to the tune Cwm Rhondda by John Hughes. The anthems were How lovely are they dwellings fair by Johannes Brahms and Holy is the true light by William Henry Harris. The service finished with the Last Post, the proclamation of the Queen Mother's styles and titles by the Garter King at Arms Peter Gwynn-Jones, Reveille and the national anthem. The voluntary was the Prelude and Fugue in E flat, BWV552 by Johann Sebastian Bach, and the Abbey bells rang half-muffled to a peal of Stedman Caters of 5101 changes.

At 12:25 pm, the bearer party lifted the coffin from the catafalque in the Abbey to the hearse outside the West Gate. The Queen and the Duke of Edinburgh observed the departure of the coffin by road for Windsor, along with other members of the royal family. The car procession began at 12:35 pm, via Broad Sanctuary, the west side of Parliament Square, Whitehall, Horse Guards, Horse Guards Arch, The Mall, the south and west sides of Victoria Memorial, Constitution Hill, Wellington Arch, Hyde Park Corner, Queen Elizabeth Gate, South Carriage Drive, Queen's Gate, Great West Road and Datchet.

The Queen and the Duke then left the abbey by car for Buckingham Palace at 12:40 pm, followed by others in the processions three minutes later. The Queen arrived at the Palace five minutes later.

== Interment ==
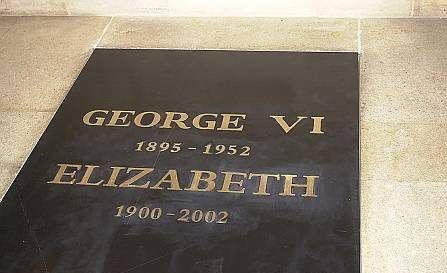
The former ledger stone naming George VI and Elizabeth in the memorial chapel, as it appeared before replacement after the interment of Elizabeth II and her husband Philip in September 2022

After the funeral of the Queen Mother on 9 April, the wreath that had been placed on her coffin was removed and laid on the Tomb of the Unknown Warrior, in a nod to her gesture on her wedding day in 1923. Queen Elizabeth was interred in the King George VI Memorial Chapel next to her husband, King George VI, who had died 50 years earlier. At the same time, the ashes of their daughter, Princess Margaret, who had died on 9 February 2002, were also interred in a private family service attended by senior members of the royal family. 20 years later, on 19 September 2022, the Queen Mother's daughter, Elizabeth II, and the Queen Mother's son-in-law, Prince Philip, were interred in the chapel following the funeral of Elizabeth II. In the days after the burial, members of the public visited the chapel to view the Queen Mother's tomb.

In August 2002, The Gazette published an honours list recognising services to Elizabeth, including members of her funeral bearer party and members of her household.

A memorial service to mark the 10th anniversary of Princess Margaret and the Queen Mother's death was held on 30 March 2012 at St George's Chapel, Windsor Castle, which was attended by the Queen and other members of the royal family.

== Observances in Commonwealth Nations ==
On the day of her funeral, 9 April, the Governor General of Canada issued a proclamation marking the day as a national day of mourning, and asked Canadians to honour Elizabeth's memory that day. An interdenominational commemorative service was also held at Christ Church Cathedral, Ottawa that day. In Australia, the Governor-General read the lesson at a memorial service held in St Andrew's Cathedral, Sydney.

== Guests ==
=== Immediate family ===
- The Queen and the Duke of Edinburgh, the Queen Mother's daughter and son-in-law
  - The Prince of Wales, the Queen Mother's grandson
    - Prince William of Wales, the Queen Mother's great-grandson
    - Prince Harry of Wales, the Queen Mother's great-grandson
  - The Princess Royal and Captain Timothy Laurence, the Queen Mother's granddaughter and grandson-in-law
    - Peter Phillips, the Queen Mother's great-grandson
    - Zara Phillips, the Queen Mother's great-granddaughter
  - The Duke of York and Sarah, Duchess of York, the Queen Mother's grandson and former granddaughter-in-law
    - Princess Beatrice of York, the Queen Mother's great-granddaughter
    - Princess Eugenie of York, the Queen Mother's great-granddaughter
  - The Earl and Countess of Wessex, the Queen Mother's grandson and granddaughter-in-law
- The Princess Margaret, Countess of Snowdon's family:
  - Viscount and Viscountess Linley, the Queen Mother's grandson and granddaughter-in-law
  - Lady Sarah and Daniel Chatto, the Queen Mother's granddaughter and grandson-in-law
- Other descendants of King George V:
- The Duke and Duchess of Gloucester, the Queen Mother's nephew and his wife
  - Earl of Ulster, the Queen Mother's great-nephew
  - Lady Davina Windsor, the Queen Mother's great-niece
  - Lady Rose Windsor, the Queen Mother's great-niece
- The Duke and Duchess of Kent, the Queen Mother's nephew and his wife
  - Earl and Countess of St Andrews, the Queen Mother's great-nephew and his wife
  - Lady Helen and Timothy Taylor, the Queen Mother's great-niece and her husband
  - Lord Nicholas Windsor, the Queen Mother's great-nephew
- Princess Alexandra, The Hon. Lady Ogilvy, the Queen Mother's niece
  - Marina Ogilvy, the Queen Mother's great-niece
- Prince and Princess Michael of Kent, the Queen Mother's nephew and his wife
  - Lord Frederick Windsor, the Queen Mother's great-nephew
  - Lady Gabriella Windsor, the Queen Mother's great-niece

=== Bowes-Lyon family ===
- The Dowager Countess of Strathmore and Kinghorne, widow of the Queen Mother's nephew
  - The Earl and Countess of Strathmore and Kinghorne, The Queen Mother's great-nephew and his wife
    - Lord Glamis, The Queen Mother's great-great-nephew
  - Lady Elizabeth and Mr Anthony Leeming, the Queen Mother's great-niece and her husband
  - Lady Diana and Mr Christopher Godfrey-Faussett, the Queen Mother's great-niece and her husband
- Lady Mary and Sir Timothy Colman, the Queen Mother's niece and her husband
- The Hon. Albemarle Bowes-Lyon, The Queen Mother's nephew
- Mr and Mrs Simon Bowes-Lyon, The Queen Mother's nephew and his wife
- The Countess of Stair, the Queen Mother's niece
  - The Earl of Stair, the Queen Mother's great-nephew
- The Hon. Margaret Rhodes, The Queen Mother's niece (and Woman of the Bedchamber)
- The Earl of Lichfield, the Queen Mother's great-nephew

=== Foreign royalty ===
==== Reigning royals ====
- The King of the Belgians
  - The Duke of Brabant
- The Sultan of Brunei
- The Queen and Prince Consort of Denmark
- Princess Muna al-Hussein of Jordan (representing the King of Jordan)
- The Prince of Liechtenstein
- Grand Duke Jean and Grand Duchess Joséphine-Charlotte of Luxembourg (representing the Grand Duke of Luxembourg)
- The Hereditary Prince of Monaco (representing the Prince of Monaco)
- The Queen of the Netherlands
- The King and Queen of Norway
- The King and Queen of Spain
- The King and Queen of Sweden

==== Non-reigning royals ====
- King Michael I and Queen Anne of Romania
- King Constantine II and Queen Anne-Marie of the Hellenes
- Crown Prince Alexander and Crown Princess Katherine of Yugoslavia
- The Prince and Princess of Hanover
- The Duke of Aosta
- The Hereditary Prince of Sayn-Wittgenstein-Berleburg

=== British politicians ===
- Tony Blair, Prime Minister of the United Kingdom, and Cherie Blair
  - John Major, former Prime Minister of the United Kingdom (1990–1997), and Dame Norma Major
  - The Baroness Thatcher, former Prime Minister of the United Kingdom (1979–1990), and Sir Denis Thatcher
  - The Lord Callaghan of Cardiff, former Prime Minister of the United Kingdom (1976–1979)
  - Sir Edward Heath, former Prime Minister of the United Kingdom (1970–1974)
- John Prescott, Deputy Prime Minister of the United Kingdom, and Mrs. Prescott
- Iain Duncan Smith, Leader of Her Majesty's Most Loyal Opposition, and Mrs. Duncan Smith
- Stephen Byers, Secretary of State for Transport
- Margaret Beckett, Secretary of State for Environment, Food and Rural Affairs
- David Trimble, First Minister of Northern Ireland, and Mrs. Trimble
- Roy Jenkins
- The Lord St John of Fawsley

=== Other dignitaries ===
- John Howard, Prime Minister of Australia
- Jean Chrétien, Prime Minister of Canada
- Mauno Koivisto, former president of Finland
- Bernadette Chirac, spouse of the president of the French Republic
- Mary McAleese, President of the Republic of Ireland
- Helen Clark, Prime Minister of New Zealand
- Laura Bush, First Lady of the United States
- William Stamps Farish III, Ambassador to the United Kingdom
- Anne Armstrong, former ambassador to the United Kingdom
- Kofi Annan, Secretary-General of the United Nations
- Lord Robertson of Port Ellen, Secretary General of NATO

=== Friends and staff ===
- Camilla Parker Bowles
- The Earl of Crawford and Balcarres, Lord Chamberlain to the Queen Mother
- Sir Alastair Aird, Private Secretary to the Queen Mother
- William Tallon, The Queen Mother's Steward and Page of the Backstairs

Source for mourners
