= Bruton Street =

Street in the City of Westminster

Coordinates: 51.51032°N 0.145°W

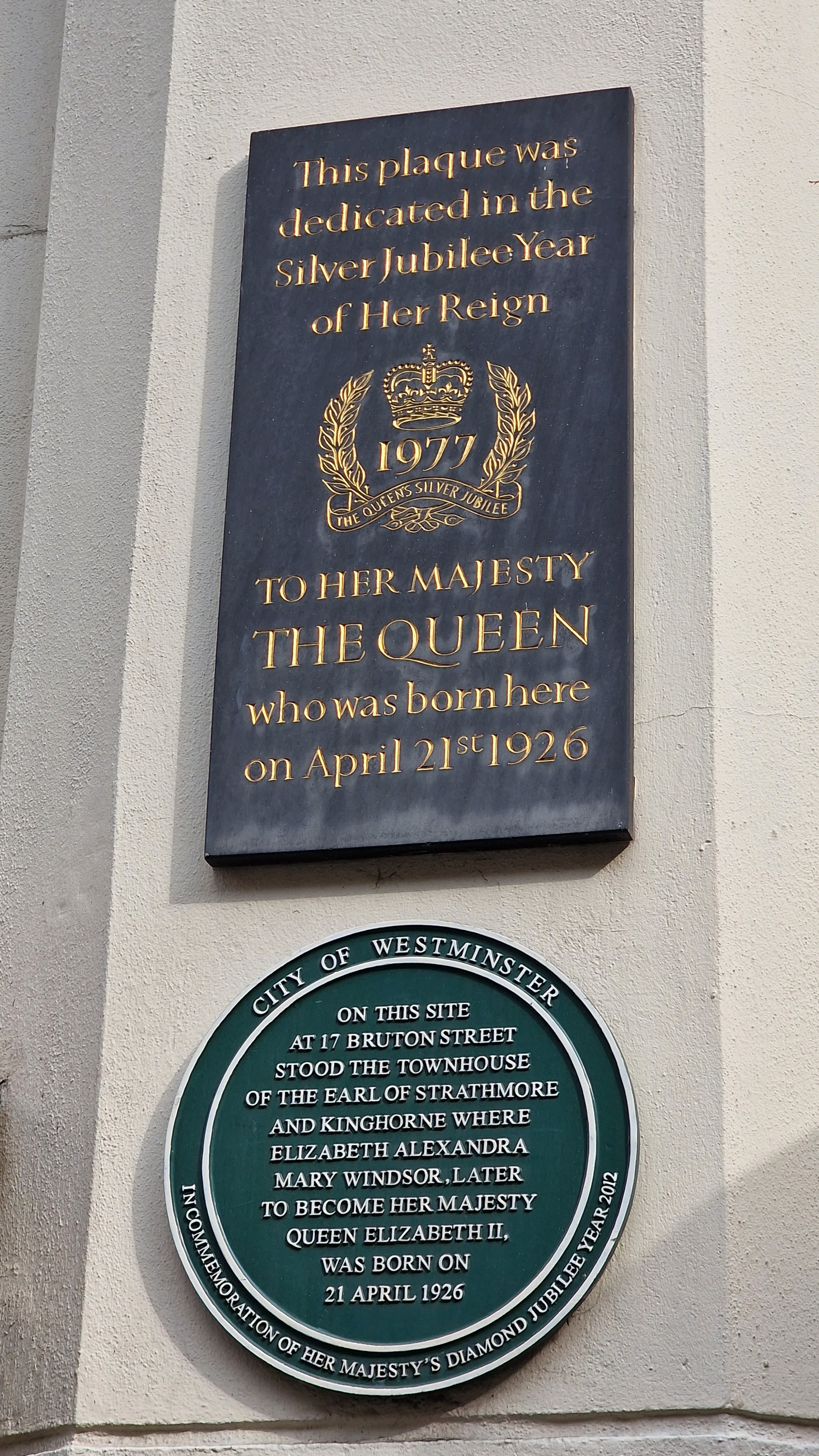
Plaque commemorating the birth of Queen Elizabeth II

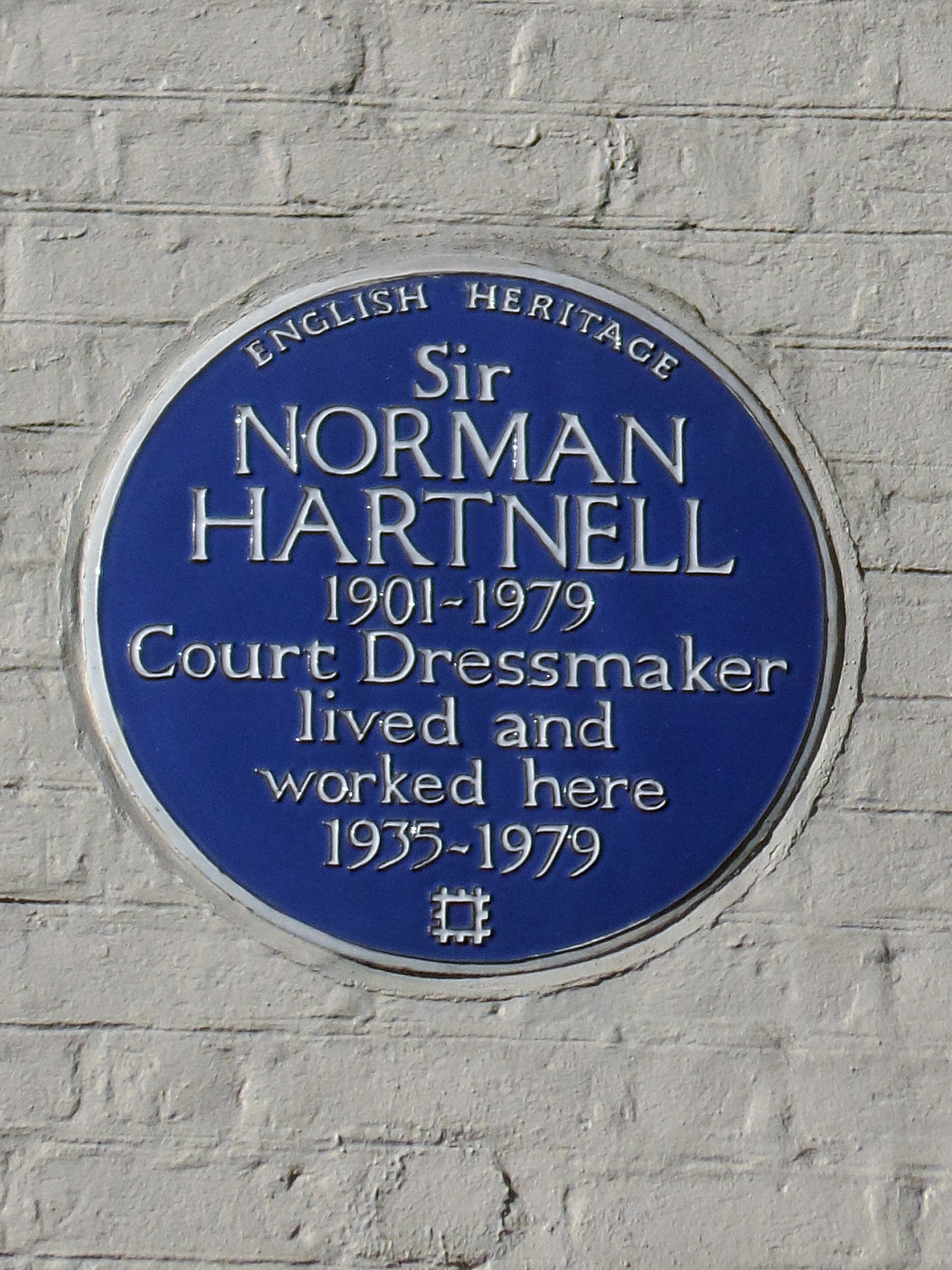
Blue plaque at No. 26

Bruton Street is a street in London's Mayfair district. Queen Elizabeth II was born at No. 17 Bruton Street in 1926, and the fashion designer Norman Hartnell lived at No. 26 for 44 years.

It runs from Berkeley Square in the south-west to New Bond Street in the north-east, where it continues as Conduit Street.

Notable residents have included Field Marshal John Campbell, 2nd Duke of Argyll, and Richard Brinsley Sheridan.

On 21 April 1926, Queen Elizabeth II was born at No. 17, the London home of her maternal grandfather, the Earl of Strathmore and Kinghorne. The house was commonly thought to have been damaged in the Blitz and demolished in the aftermath, but archival documents at the British Library prove that the house had been demolished by property developers between 1937 and 1939, before the start of the war.

The fashion designer Norman Hartnell lived and worked at No. 26 from 1935 until his death in 1979.

The antiquarian and philanthropist Ivan Donald Margary lived in his youth with his family at Bruton Street.
