= Death and funeral of Queen Elizabeth =

Death and funeral of Queen Elizabeth may refer to:

- Death and funeral of Queen Elizabeth the Queen Mother (1900–2002), queen consort of the United Kingdom from 1936 to 1952
- Death and state funeral of Elizabeth II (1926–2022), queen of the United Kingdom from 1952 to 2022
