= She's Gone =

She's Gone may refer to:

== Music ==
=== Songs ===
- "She's Gone", a song by Bob Marley from Kaya
- "She's Gone" (Hall & Oates song)
- "She's Gone" (Steelheart song)
- "She's Gone", a song by Black Sabbath from Technical Ecstasy
- "She's Gone", a song by Brutha from Brutha
- "She's Gone", a song by Eric Clapton from Pilgrim
- "She’s Gone", a song by L.A.B.
- "She's Gone", a song by NOFX from White Trash, Two Heebs and a Bean
- "She's Gone", a song by Soft Machine, produced by Joe Boyd
- "She's Gone", a song by Suggs from The Lone Ranger
- "She's Gone", a song by Tindersticks originally from Tindersticks (1995 album)

=== Other music ===
- She's Gone, a 2013 album by Upset

== Other uses ==
- She's Gone (film), a 2004 UK television film
- "She's Gone" (CSI: Vegas), a 2022 television episode
- She's Gone, 2007 debut novel by Kwame Dawes
- She Is Gone, an alternative title for the poem "Remember Me" by English painter and poet David Harkins

== See also ==
- "She's Gone, Gone, Gone", a 1965 country music song written by Harlan Howard
