= Streatlam Castle =

Former country house in County Durham, United Kingdom

- County Durham, England, UK
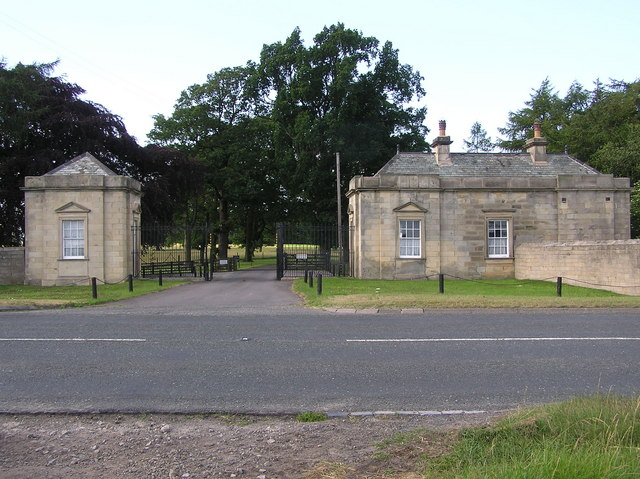
- Streatlam Park

Location
- Location in County Durham
- Coordinates: 54.571°N 1.870°W
- Grid reference: NZ085195

Streatlam Castle was a Baroque English country house near the town of Barnard Castle in County Durham, that was demolished in 1959. Owned by the Bowes-Lyon family, Earls of Strathmore and Kinghorne, the house was one of their three principal seats, alongside Glamis Castle in Forfarshire, Scotland, and Gibside, near Gateshead. Streatlam incorporated some 1,190 acres (4.8 km^{2}) of land, along with an estate consisting of some twenty farms. The last occupant was Lord Glamis, later the 15th Earl, although the estate was still owned at the time by his father, the 14th Earl, uncle to Queen Elizabeth II.

== History ==
The house had come to the Bowes family by the fifteenth century. For much of the nineteenth century, it was owned by the art collector John Bowes, who founded the Bowes Museum in nearby Barnard Castle. He was the eldest son of the 10th Earl of Strathmore, but, as his parents did not marry until after his birth, he was able to inherit only a life interest in the family's English wealth and properties. During his tenancy, Streatlam was described as consisting of twenty-four bedrooms, two oak drawing-rooms, the yellow drawing room, the great dining room, the billiard-room, the study and the gentlemen's room.

Following his death without issue, the estate was reunited with the Earldom in 1885.

Streatlam sat amid the beautiful countryside of the Durham Dales, in contrast to the family's other house in the north-east, Gibside, which lay within a major coalfield near Gateshead and so was considered spoilt by pollution from the surrounding coal mines.

== Decline and demolition ==
The last occupier was Patrick Bowes-Lyon, Lord Glamis, heir to the Earldom, who had been living there since at least 1915. The Earl of Strathmore was determined to sell off the house and the land, however, and the bulk of the estate was sold to private tenants, with the remainder fetching £100,000 at auction.

In 1922 The Daily Telegraph reported that the 14th Earl was selling the Streatlam Castle estate on the Yorkshire and Durham borders; the asking price for the Castle and 1,198 surrounding acres was reportedly £37,500, with an option to purchase the remaining 4,806 acres.

Lord Glamis moved to a substantial farm near East Grinstead, where he resided until he succeeded his father as Earl of Strathmore in 1944.

Some see it as little surprise that the Earl of Strathmore chose Glamis Castle over Streatlam, the house being considered architecturally "awkward and unsatisfactory" (as was claimed in Country Life Magazine in 1915). Also, as the aristocratic titles of the last owner and occupant would suggest, Streatlam was less important in historical terms. Another possible reason is that, for much of the nineteenth century, the Scottish and English estates had been split, with Streatlam and Gibside owned by John Bowes and his wife, which meant that the Scottish branch of the Bowes-Lyon family, namely the Earls of Strathmore, had not been in ownership or residence at Streatlam for from 1820 to 1885, thereby becoming more focused on their Scottish estates. The English estates only reverted to the Earl and his descendants when John Bowes died without issue, leaving his fortune to his first cousin once removed, the 13th Earl, in 1885.

Although there was no pressing financial need to sell at the time, with the family still earning a substantial income from the estate's coal mining holdings, in the end the house was simply considered superfluous. The Earl also owned Wemmergill in County Durham, St Paul's Walden Bury in Hertfordshire and the Gibside estate in Gateshead. It was also a time when many aristocratic families were seeking to cut back on ostentatious displays of wealth following the destruction of the nobility in the Russian Revolution, plus there was a shortage of domestic servants following the First World War.

Lady Strathmore, though ill at the time, hurried down to Streatlam to rescue as many items as possible, many of which were taken to Glamis Castle. The armorial ceilings, installed at Streatlam by John Bowes, were moved to the Bowes Museum, which he had established.

After World War II, many country houses were being demolished. Finally in 1959 the shell was blown up as a training exercise by the Territorial Army. Today only Streatlam Park and its entrance lodges (shown above) remain.

An exhibition on the history of Streatlam Castle opened at the Bowes Museum in November 2017, and then moved to Glamis Castle in March 2018. It included paintings previously displayed at the property, and scale models of the castle and the estate.
