= Woolmers Park =

Coordinates: 51.7761°N 0.1378°W

Woolmers Park is a Grade II* listed country house in the civil parish of Hertingfordbury, in the East Hertfordshire district, in the county of Hertfordshire, England. It was the residence of Claude Bowes-Lyon, 14th Earl of Strathmore and Kinghorne and Cecilia Bowes-Lyon, Countess of Strathmore and Kinghorne in the 1920s. It was acquired by Arthur Lucas in 1949, and the Hertfordshire Polo Club was established within the grounds.
