= Michael Bowes-Lyon, 18th Earl of Strathmore and Kinghorne =

British peer

The Right Honourable The Earl of Strathmore and Kinghorne DL
- Strathmore in 2012

Deputy Chief Whip of the House of Lords Captain of the Yeomen of the Guard
- In office 30 December 1991 – 20 July 1994
- Monarch: Elizabeth II
- Prime Minister: John Major
- Preceded by: The Viscount Davidson
- Succeeded by: The Earl of Arran

Member of the House of Lords
- Lord Temporal
- In office 20 August 1987 – 11 November 1999 as a hereditary peer
- Preceded by: The 17th Earl of Strathmore and Kinghorne
- Succeeded by: Seat abolished (Note: Pursuant to the House of Lords Act 1999.)

Personal details
- Born: Michael Fergus Bowes-Lyon; 7 June 1957 Windsor, Berkshire, England
- Died: 27 February 2016 (aged 58) London, England
- Spouses: Isobel Weatherall (m. 1984; div. 2005) Damaris Stuart-William (m. 2005; div. 2008) Karen Baxter (m. 2012)
- Children: 4, including Simon
- Parents: Fergus Bowes-Lyon, 17th Earl of Strathmore and Kinghorne; Mary McCorquodale
- Education: University of Aberdeen; Royal Military Academy Sandhurst

Military service
- Allegiance: United Kingdom
- Branch/service: British Army
- Years of service: 1980–1984
- Rank: Captain
- Unit: Scots Guards

Michael Fergus Bowes-Lyon, 18th and 5th Earl of Strathmore and Kinghorne (7 June 1957 – 27 February 2016), styled Lord Glamis between 1972 and 1987, also known as Mikey Strathmore, was a British Conservative politician, Scots Guards officer and stockbroker. He was a first cousin once removed of Queen Elizabeth II, and second cousin of King Charles III.

== Early life and education ==
Strathmore was born on 7 June 1957 in Windsor, the only son of Fergus Bowes-Lyon, later 17th Earl of Strathmore and Kinghorne, and his wife, Mary Pamela McCorquodale. His paternal grandfather, Lieutenant-Colonel The Honourable Michael Bowes-Lyon, was an elder brother of Queen Elizabeth the Queen Mother, thus making Michael a first cousin once removed of Queen Elizabeth II and Princess Margaret. He served as the Queen Mother's page of honour from 1971 to 1973 and often stayed with her at the Castle of Mey and the Royal Lodge, Windsor. He was raised in Humbie, East Lothian, with his two sisters, Elizabeth and Diana.

He was educated at Sunningdale School and Eton College before reading Land Economy at the University of Aberdeen. He attended the Royal Military Academy Sandhurst.

== Career ==
After Sandhurst, Strathmore was commissioned in the Scots Guards in 1980. He held the rank of lieutenant and was later promoted to captain in 1984. He served in Northern Ireland and Hong Kong.

He left the army in 1984, going to work in the City of London for the stock brokerage firm Strauss Turnbull. In 1987, Strathmore succeeded his father as 18th Earl of Strathmore and Kinghorne and inherited Holwick Hall in Teesdale, County Durham, and Glamis Castle, the Queen Mother's girlhood home, in Angus.

He took his seat in the House of Lords. He served as a lord-in-waiting from 1989 to 1992 and served as Captain of the Yeomen of the Guard and Deputy Chief Whip of the House of Lords in the First Major ministry. His achievements included the ratification of the Maastricht Treaty by the Lords. He retired in 1994 and subsequently lost his seat in November 1999 with the passing of the House of Lords Act 1999. After resigning his ministerial post, Strathmore sat on the board of Polypipe from 1994 until it was acquired by IMI plc in 1999. He was a member of White's and Pratt's.

He was appointed a deputy lieutenant of Angus on 19 April 1993. He also served as president of Boys' Brigade from 1994 to 1999 and as patron of the Friends of the Bowes Museum in County Durham, a position he inherited from the Queen Mother.

== Personal life ==
Strathmore was married three times. On 14 November 1984, Lord Glamis, as he was then, married Isobel Charlotte Weatherall (born c. 1962), great-granddaughter of Henry Keswick and sister of Percy Weatherall, at St James's Church, Piccadilly, with the Queen Mother in attendance. Strathmore and Weatherall were separated in 2003 and divorced in 2005. They had three sons:

- Simon Patrick Bowes-Lyon, 19th and 6th Earl of Strathmore and Kinghorne (born 18 June 1986)
- The Honourable John Fergus Bowes-Lyon (born 1988), he married Rosanna Eloise “Posy” Brinkley (b. 1990) in 2022; they have one son.
  - Albemarle John Bowes-Lyon (born 17 April 2023)
- The Honourable George Norman Bowes-Lyon (born 1991)

On 24 November 2005, Strathmore married Damaris Stuart-William, a clinical psychologist. They were separated in 2007 and divorced in 2008. They had one son:

- The Honourable Toby Peter Fergus Bowes-Lyon (born March 2005)

On 4 August 2012, Strathmore married Karen Baxter (née Orrock), who survived him.

As a hobby, he restored old automobiles and lorries, often featuring in the Strathmore Vintage Vehicle Rally. In 2002, as the head of the Bowes-Lyon family, he walked behind the Queen Mother's coffin during her funeral procession and attended the private service of committal in the King George VI Memorial Chapel.

Strathmore died of colorectal cancer on 27 February 2016 in London, aged 58. A memorial service was held at the Church of St Mary the Virgin in Middleton-in-Teesdale, near his County Durham properties, on 12 May and another, attended by Prince Charles, was held at St Martin-in-the-Fields in London on 8 June.

== Arms ==
Coat of arms of Michael Bowes-Lyon, 18th Earl of Strathmore and Kinghorne
Coronet A Coronet of an Earl Crest Between two Slips of Laurel a Demi Lady to the girdle habited and holding in her right hand a Thistle all proper Escutcheon Quarterly: 1st and 4th, Argent a Lion rampant Azure armed and langued Gules within a Double Tressure flory counterflory of the second (Lyon); 2nd and 3rd, Ermine three Bows strings palewise proper (Bowes); as a Royal Augmentation, granted to the holder of the Earldom only, an Inescutcheon en surtout Azure thereon a Rose Argent barbed Vert seeded Or ensigned with an Imperial Crown proper within a Double Tressure flory counterflory of the second, the said Inescutcheon ensigned with an Earl's Coronet proper Supporters On the dexter side a Unicorn Argent armed unguled maned and tufted Or, and on the sinister side a Lion per fess Or and Gules Motto In Te Domine Speravi (In Thee, O Lord, have I put my trust; Psalm 31)

== Notes ==
Political offices
Preceded by The Lord Strathclyde	Lord-in-waiting; 1989–1992	Succeeded by The Baroness Denton of Wakefield
Preceded by The Viscount Davidson	Captain of the Yeomen of the Guard; 1991–1994	Succeeded by The Earl of Arran
Court offices
Preceded by Simon Mulholland	Page of Honour to The Queen Mother; 1971–1973	Succeeded by George Clayton
Peerage of the United Kingdom
Preceded by Fergus Bowes-Lyon	Earl of Strathmore and Kinghorne; 1987–2016; Member of the House of Lords (1987–1999)	Succeeded by Simon Bowes-Lyon
Peerage of Scotland
Preceded by Fergus Bowes-Lyon	Earl of Strathmore and Kinghorne; 1987–2016	Succeeded by Simon Bowes-Lyon
