= Martin Smith (Royal Marines officer) =

Royal Marines officer (born 1962)

Major General Martin Smith CB MBE DL
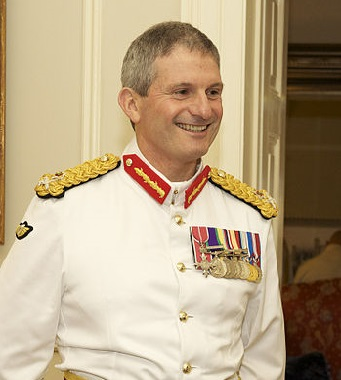
- Martin Smith
- Born: 30 July 1962 (age 64)
- Military career
- Allegiance: United Kingdom
- Branch: Royal Marines
- Service years: 1984–2017
- Rank: Major General
- Service number: N027987R
- Commands: Commandant General Royal Marines; 3 Commando Brigade; 30 Commando Information Exploitation Group
- Conflicts: The Troubles; Gulf War; Iraq War; War in Afghanistan
- Awards: Companion of the Order of the Bath; Member of the Order of the British Empire

Major General Martin Linn Smith, CB, MBE, DL (born 30 July 1962) is a former senior Royal Marines officer who served as Commandant General Royal Marines from 2014 to 2016. He was previously commander of 3 Commando Brigade, and before that commanding officer of 30 Commando Information Exploitation Group and deputy commander of 3 Commando Brigade. Smith is currently the Managing Director of CyberPrism.

== Early life ==
Smith was born on 30 July 1962 in Pembury, Kent, England. He was educated at Sevenoaks School, a private school in Sevenoaks, Kent: originally an all-boys school, it became co-educational when girls were admitted from 1976. He studied zoology at the University of Bristol, graduating with a Bachelor of Science (BSc) degree.

== Military career ==
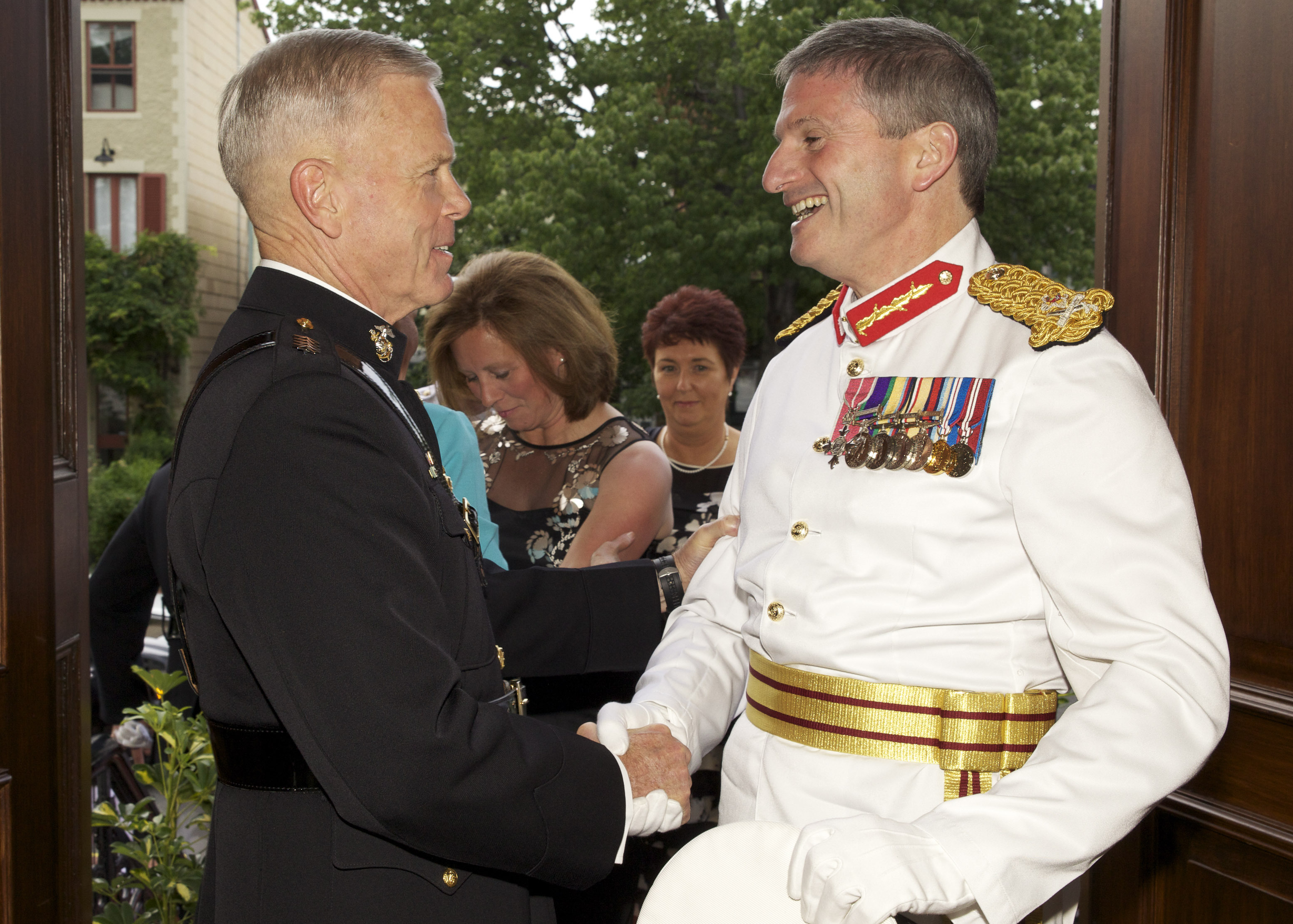
Smith meeting with James F. Amos, Commandant of the U.S. Marine Corps, in 2014

Smith was commissioned into the Royal Marines in May 1984. During his early career, he served as a troop commander, a forward air controller, a mortar troop commander and a special forces officer in the Special Boat Service. He completed postings to Northern Ireland during The Troubles, and to Norway. He went on to specialise in reconnaissance and was deployed as part of the Gulf War in 1991.

In 1995, he attended the Royal Navy Staff Course and completed a Master of Arts (MA) degree in defence studies. From 1996 to 1997, he served as a staff officer specialising in operations. He then joined Headquarters Royal Marines where he served as staff officer to the chief of staff. In the 1998 Queen's Birthday Honours, he was appointed a Member of the Order of the British Empire (MBE). From 2000 to 2001, he worked at the Permanent Joint Headquarters within its Operations Division.

Following the 9/11 terrorist attacks, he was posted to the United States as part of the initial UK advisory team attached to the United States Central Command. In November 2001, he was appointed Second in Command of 45 Commando. With them, he deployed to Afghanistan and took part in Operation Jacana in 2002. With the start of the Iraq War, he was posted to the multinational headquarters as Deputy Chief of Operations.

Smith was appointed commanding officer of 30 Commando Information Exploitation Group. In August 2006, he joined FLEET Operations as head of plans. In July 2008, he was appointed deputy commander of 3 Commando Brigade. He was deployed to Afghanistan, where he served as commander, Battle Group Centre South during Op HERRICK 9. In 2011, he was appointed commander of 3 Commando Brigade. In June 2013, he left to study at the Royal College of Defence Studies.

Smith was promoted to major general and appointed Commandant General Royal Marines on 13 June 2014, in succession to Major General Ed Davis. Smith was posted as a deputy adviser to the Afghanistan Ministry of Interior ('MOI') in June 2016.

Smith was appointed Companion of the Order of the Bath (CB) in the 2017 New Year Honours. He was appointed Deputy Lieutenant of Angus (DL) in 2021.

Military offices
Preceded by Ed Davis	Commandant General Royal Marines; 2014–2016	Succeeded by Robert Magowan
