= Lady Mary Colman =

English socialite and philanthropist (1932–2021)

- Born: Mary Cecilia Bowes-Lyon; 30 January 1932; Biggleswade, Bedfordshire, England
- Died: 2 January 2021 (aged 88); Bixley, Norfolk, England
- Spouse: Sir Timothy Colman (m. 1951)
- Children: 5; including Sarah
- Parent(s): The Hon. Michael Bowes-Lyon; Elizabeth Margaret Cator
- Relatives: Claude Bowes-Lyon, 14th Earl of Strathmore and Kinghorne (grandfather); Queen Elizabeth the Queen Mother (aunt); Elizabeth II (cousin)

Lady Mary Cecilia Colman (née Bowes-Lyon; 30 January 1932 – 2 January 2021) was an English socialite, philanthropist, and extra lady-in-waiting to Princess Alexandra, The Honourable Lady Ogilvy.

The daughter of Michael Bowes-Lyon and Elizabeth Margaret Cator, her paternal aunt was Queen Elizabeth the Queen Mother, and she was thus a first cousin of Queen Elizabeth II and Princess Margaret, Countess of Snowdon.

== Early life ==
Mary Cecilia Bowes-Lyon was born on 30 January 1932 at Gastlings, the Bowes-Lyon family home in Biggleswade, Bedfordshire. Her father, Michael Bowes-Lyon (1893–1953), was the fifth son of Claude Bowes-Lyon, 14th Earl of Strathmore and Kinghorne and Cecilia Bowes-Lyon, Countess of Strathmore and Kinghorne (née Cavendish-Bentinck). Her mother, Elizabeth Margaret Cator (1899–1959), was a great-granddaughter of Charles Yorke, 4th Earl of Hardwicke. She had a twin sister, Patricia Maud, later Lady Patricia Tetley, an older brother, Fergus Michael Claude, later Fergus Bowes-Lyon, 17th Earl of Strathmore and Kinghorne, and a younger brother, Michael Albemarle. Lady Mary was also a godmother to Diana, Princess of Wales.

She attended Hatherop Castle School as a child. In 1949, a coming-out ball was held for her and her twin sister Patricia at Londonderry House, which was attended by their aunt, the Queen, and their cousins, Princesses Elizabeth and Margaret.

== Marriage and children ==
On 10 November 1951 at St Bartholomew-the-Great in London, Mary married the then-Lieutenant Timothy Colman, son of the cricketer Geoffrey Colman. Together, they had five children:

- Sarah Rose Colman (b. 3 May 1953). Married Peter John Charles Troughton in 1977. 3 children.
- Sabrina Mary Colman (b. 4 February 1955). Married Christopher Arthur Penn in 1976. 2 children.
- Emma Elizabeth Colman (b. 10 February 1958). Married Richard Henry Ramsbottom in 1986. 1 child.
- James Russell Colman (b. 12 January 1962). Married Sasha Cotterell in 1994. 2 children.
- Matthew Geoffrey Colman (b. 10 July 1966). Married Jane Johnstone in 1997. 2 children.

In the earlier years of their marriage, the Colmans lived in Dorset, whilst Timothy served with the Royal Navy. Later, they moved to Norfolk, where they purchased Bixley Manor.

== Work and later life ==
In 1970, Mary was appointed an Extra Lady-in-waiting to another of the Queen's first cousins, Princess Alexandra, The Hon. Lady Ogilvy. After her elder brother succeeded their cousin as 17th Earl of Strathmore and Kinghorne, she received the title and precedence of a daughter of an earl by royal warrant of precedence in 1974. In 1998, she began serving as the President of the Eastern Daily Press's "We Care 2000" Appeal, which aims to support unpaid carers for the work they do. She also worked with other charities including the British Red Cross, and served as president of the Norfolk Autistic Society for 26 years, from 1975 until her retirement in 2001. She also ran a dried flower business, called "Flora Dessica".

Lady Mary died at her home in Bixley, Norfolk on 2 January 2021, at the age of 88.
