= Deputy lieutenant of Angus =

Commissioned by the Lord Lieutenant of Angus

A deputy lieutenant of Angus is commissioned by the Lord Lieutenant of Angus.

Deputy lieutenants support the work of the lord-lieutenant. There can be several deputy lieutenants at any time, depending on the population of the county. Their appointment does not terminate with the changing of the lord-lieutenant, but they usually retire at age 75.

== 20th century ==
- 30 January 1960: Major James Neil Ballingall Pattullo
- 8 September 1960: Major Thomas Prain Douglas Murray, MBE TD
- 30 March 1961: Lieutenant-Colonel and Brevet Colonel Donald William Murray Morrison, OBE MC TD
- 30 March 1961: Lieutenant Colonel Moir Patrick Stormonith-Darling
- 29 September 1964: Honorary Captain The Earl of Airlie, KT GCVO PC
- 21 April 1969: Lieutenant-Colonel Leslie George Gray-Cheape
- 1 December 1971: Lieutenant Colonel William John Campbell Adamson, TD
- 1 December 1971: Colonel George Willoughby Dunn, CBE DSO MC TD
- 1 December 1971: Lieutenant Colonel and Brevet Colonel Andrew Beatty Houstoun, OBE MC
- 1 December 1971: Commandant Dame Evelyn Louisa Elizabeth Hoyer-Millar, DBE
- 27 July 1973: Captain The Earl of Strathmore and Kinghorne
- 19 August 1977: Colonel John George Mathieson, TD
- 19 August 1977: Colonel Charles Newbigging Thomson, CBE DSO TD
- 19 August 1977: Captain Charles Alastair Ogilvy MacLean
- 28 March 1984: John Raoul Wilmot Stansfeld, Esq., MBE
- 12 July 1984: Ruth Dundas
- 29 August 1984: Robert Scrymgoure Steuart Fothringham, Esq.
- 18 July 1985: Major General Rodenck Jams Ephraums, CB OBE
- 18 January 1988: Baroness Carnegy of Lour
- 18 January 1988: The Lord Lyell
- 11 May 1989: The Dowager Countess of Strathmore and Kinghorne
- 11 May 1989: Graham Noel Johnston Smart, Esq.
- 19 April 1993: The Rt. Hon. The Earl of Strathmore and Kinghorne
- 19 April 1993: William Henry Porter, Esq.
- 19 April 1993: The Hon. The Earl of Dalhousie, CStJ
- 19 April 1993: Brigadier Lyndon Bolton, DSO*
- 27 March 1997: Colonel Michael John Christian Anstice, MC TD

== 21st century ==
- 29 October 2003: Frances Elsbeth Duncan, OBE OStJ
- 29 October 2003: Margaret Young Bett
- 29 October 2003: Colonel Jonathan Roy Hensman, OBE
- 12 January 2010: Robina Addison, MBE
- 2 August 2016: Norman Atkinson, OBE
- 2 August 2016: Hugh Campbell Adamson
- 2 August 2016: Ian Lamb
- 2 August 2016: Deborah Porter
- 30 July 2021: Major General Martin Linn Smith, CB MBE
