= 17 Bruton Street, Mayfair =

17 Bruton Street
- Historic England photograph (AL0141/056/01) showing the now-demolished townhouse at 17 Bruton Street, Mayfair

- Location within Central London

General information
- Architectural style: Georgian
- Location: 17 Bruton Street, Mayfair, London W1, London, United Kingdom
- Coordinates: 51.5103°N 0.1456°W
- Current tenants: Commercial offices
- Completed: 1742
- Demolished: March 1937

Design and construction
- Architect: attributed to Isaac Ware
- Known for: Birthplace of Queen Elizabeth II

17 Bruton Street was a large, eighteenth-century townhouse located next to Berkeley Square in Mayfair, London. Built in 1742, it was leased by the 14th Earl of Strathmore and Kinghorne during the 1920s. On 21 April 1926, Lord Strathmore's daughter Elizabeth, Duchess of York, gave birth at the house to Princess Elizabeth of York, who would later become the longest-reigning Sovereign of the United Kingdom. The building was demolished in 1937 and replaced by Berkeley Square House.

== History and occupants ==
The house was the town residence of the 3rd Earl of Rosebery in 1796. In 1831 the lease, which then had a remaining term of four years, was held by Thomas, 6th Earl of Berkeley. In 1832 the house was taken by William Pole-Tylney-Long-Wellesley (who later became 4th Earl of Mornington).

Various contemporary newspaper articles record a number of tenants as the occupants of the house during the 1850s and 1860s, including Miles Stapleton, 10th Baron Beaumont, who died there on 16 August 1854, followed by Hugh Fortescue, Viscount Ebrington in November 1855, and John Bligh, 6th Earl of Darnley in March 1860. The Morning Post reported that the Countess of Carnarvon (wife of Henry Herbert, 4th Earl of Carnarvon) gave birth to a stillborn son at the house on 21 July 1862.

By December 1869 the house had become the London home of William Campbell, 2nd Baron Stratheden and Campbell, whose family continued to occupy the House until 1920. Following his death in January 1893, the House became the home of his brother and successor, who loaned the house to Mrs Alban Gibbs for a dance held on 30 May 1893.

In 1905, Kenneth Campbell, youngest son of Lord and Lady Stratheden and Campbell, married Rosalina Oppenheim; this was reported as something of a novelty in the Daily Mirror due to the fact that the bride's parents (Mr and Mrs Henry Oppenheim) and groom's parents were neighbours in London, occupying No. 16 and 17 Bruton Street respectively.

During the First World War the Campbell family based an appeal for donations of clothing and money to support Lord Kitchener's Army at No. 17 Bruton Street. The 3rd Baron Stratheden and Campbell died at the house on 26 December 1918.

By March 1920 the house was being used as the headquarters of the anti-communist Liberty League. On 11 March 1920 the house was the site of a Breton-themed fête held in aid of the ex-Services Welfare Society, which was opened by Louise, Princess Royal, who was accompanied by her daughter Princess Maud of Fife. The purpose of the society was outlined by Sir Frederick Milner, who was appealing for funds to establish a hostel for the approximately 6,000 ex-servicemen who had "lost their mental balance in the war and are at present in the Poor Law asylums."

On 15 April 1920 the house was used for the wedding reception of Major Charles Gore, son of Sir Francis Charles Gore, and Kathleen Annesley, daughter of former Comptroller of the Household Arthur Annesley, 11th Viscount Valentia. Lady Blythswood was loaned the house by Lord Stratheden and Campbell for a debutante dance she hosted for her daughter Olive Campbell in July 1920; the event was reportedly attended by nearly 300 guests, including Princess Margaret of Denmark.

Later in the same year, it was reported in The Times that an auction of the contents of the house would be held on 8 November due to the sale of the lease of the property.

=== Bowes-Lyon family ===
In June 1920, Claude, 14th Earl of Strathmore and Kinghorne, and his wife Cecilia, Countess of Strathmore and Kinghorne, vacated No. 20 St James's Square, which had been used as the family's London townhouse since 1906. A temporary lease was taken over a house in Eaton Square, and by April 1921 the lease of No. 17 Bruton Street had been acquired and renovations were underway in preparation for the Bowes-Lyon family's occupation of the house. The family had moved in to their new Bruton Street residence by March 1922.

In January 1923, the Strathmores' youngest daughter, Lady Elizabeth Bowes-Lyon, had become engaged to Prince Albert, Duke of York. Lady Strathmore arrived at 17 Bruton Street on 9 April in preparation for her daughter's wedding. On 26 April 1923, Lady Elizabeth departed from No. 17 Bruton Street for Westminster Abbey, where she and Prince Albert were married.

The house was loaned by Lord and Lady Strathmore for a chamber music concert hosted by pianist Mathilde Verne on 14 June 1928. Lord Strathmore sold the lease of the property in early 1929; the Evening Standard reported on 26 March that the Strathmores would vacate the property in mid-April of that year, and that the reported purchase price of the house was £26,000. On 1 July couturier Norman Hartnell hosted a circus-themed party at the house.

==== Birthplace of Princess Elizabeth of York ====
The Duchess of York arrived at the property on 6 April 1926 in preparation for the birth of her first child. On the evening of 20 April the then Home Secretary Sir William Joynson-Hicks was summoned to No. 17 to be present for the birth, and during the morning of 21 April the Duchess gave birth to Princess Elizabeth of York, reportedly in a "quiet room at the back overlooking the garden," on the first floor of the house. Later on the same day the baby Princess' paternal grandparents King George V and Queen Mary were driven from Windsor Castle to 17 Bruton Street to see their new granddaughter.

The Duke and Duchess of York and the young Princess left the house on 10 August 1926 to visit the Duchess's ancestral home Glamis Castle. They continued to use the house as a temporary London residence, and were photographed on the front steps in January 1927 when they departed for their tour of Australia and New Zealand, during which they opened the newly-finished Commonwealth Parliament House in Canberra. Their household had relocated from 17 Bruton Street by the time they returned from the tour in mid-1927.

=== Commercial use and demolition ===
By January 1930 the house was available to be leased for commercial use. During the same year it was one of approximately fifteen mansions on Bruton Street (including Nos. 11–19 and 15–20) purchased by the Canadian Pacific Railway Company, with the intention to demolish the houses to construct a large luxury hotel. The combined size of the parcel of land containing the 15 houses was 54,460 square feet; advertisements for an auction to sell as 99-year lease of the site, scheduled for 8 November 1930, note that the combined ground rent of the properties was £5,600. Plans for the construction of a hotel on the site were postponed in May 1931, and it was later announced in February 1934 that No. 17 Bruton Street would be used as the Company's headquarters in London.

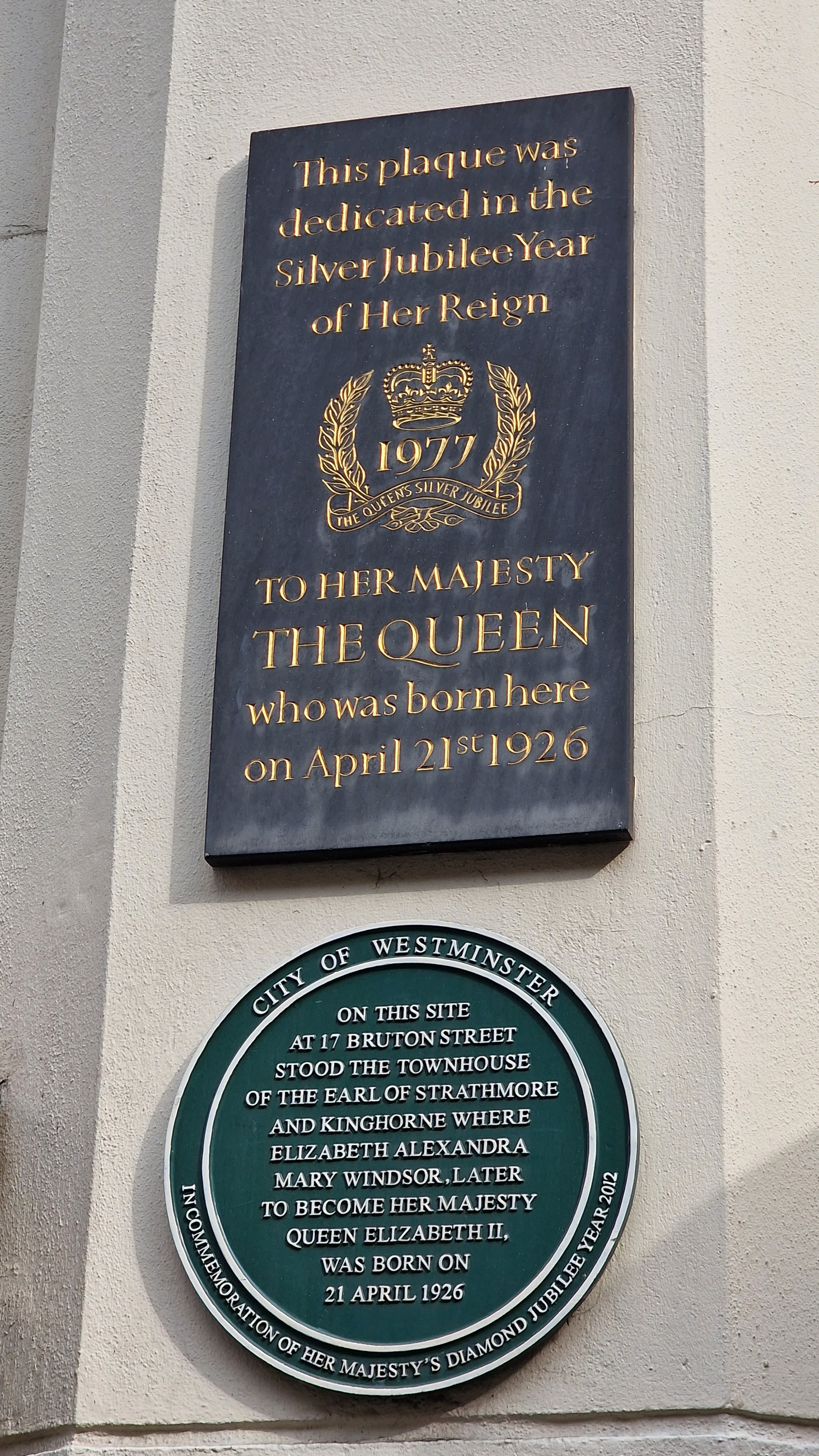
Commemorative plaque at 17 Bruton Street, Mayfair.

The house was demolished in March 1937; The Daily Telegraph reported that it would be replaced by a 145-foot office tower, noting that during the 1930s much of Bruton Street had been commercialised, and that the remaining buildings which "retain the appearance of private houses are in nearly every case dressmarkers' shops and offices." In 1938 Berkeley Square House was constructed over a large parcel of land which included the site where 17 Bruton Street had stood; the new building was reportedly one of the largest office blocks in Europe at the time of its construction, and one of London's first major reinforced concrete buildings.

A plaque outside the existing building commemorates the site as the birthplace of Queen Elizabeth II.

== Architecture and interior ==
Built in 1742, the design of the house has been attributed to Isaac Ware. In 1831 the house was described in a newspaper advertisement as a "capital mansion...near Berkeley-square, having a frontage of 54 feet and a depth of 130 feet, with a garden and seven-stall stable behind, opening into Bruton Mews. The mansion contains numerous suites of spacious rooms and all the requisite offices, and is held of the Earl of Berkeley for an unexpired term of four years from 3d of August next, at a ground rent of only £26 6s. 6d. per annum."

A description of the house published in 1911 noted that "the façade of this interesting front consist of a fine treatment of the Corinthian order placed directly upon a rusticated basement story," and also noted that the house was "architecturally...somewhat cold; the attic story is a Victorian addition without merit."

In an article published on 16 February 1934 in The Daily Telegraph described the house as having a "dignified elevation in the style of the English Renaissance," and containing "an ample suite of reception-rooms, including a ballroom measuring 50ft by 21ft."

Following the house's demolition in March 1937, The Guardian reported in July of the same year that the house's exterior had featured an "imposing columned plaster front and a humble brick back overlooking a tiny stone-flagged garden with an old stables-still with a horse-box at the end,", whilst the interior included "stately entrance hall with a groined ceiling and relief medallions, probably by Flaxman."
