= Patrick Bowes-Lyon, 15th Earl of Strathmore and Kinghorne =

British peer (1884–1949)

The Right Honourable The Earl of Strathmore and Kinghorne DL
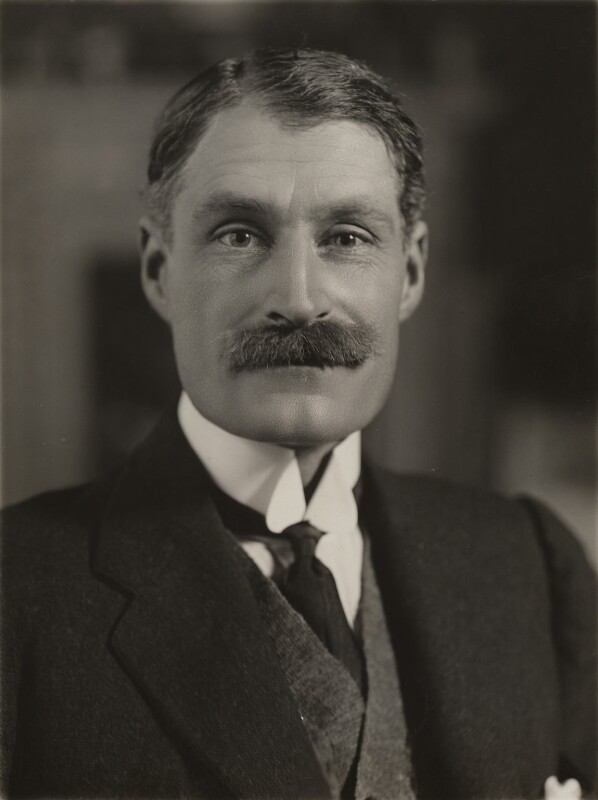
- Strathmore in 1923
- Born: Patrick Bowes-Lyon, Master of Glamis; 22 September 1884; St Paul's Walden Bury, Hertfordshire, England
- Died: 25 May 1949 (aged 64); Angus, Scotland
- Spouse: Lady Dorothy Osborne (m. 1908; died 1946)
- Children: John Bowes-Lyon, Master of Glamis; Lady Cecilia Harington; Timothy Bowes-Lyon, 16th Earl of Strathmore and Kinghorne; Lady Nancy Blair
- Parents: Claude Bowes-Lyon, 14th Earl of Strathmore and Kinghorne (father); Cecilia Cavendish-Bentinck (mother)
- Relatives: Queen Elizabeth the Queen Mother (sister)

Patrick Bowes-Lyon, 15th and 2nd Earl of Strathmore and Kinghorne (22 September 1884 – 25 May 1949), styled as Master of Glamis until 1904 and Lord Glamis until 1944, was a British landowner, peer and British Army officer. He was the eldest brother of Queen Elizabeth the Queen Mother, thus a maternal uncle of Queen Elizabeth II.

== Life ==
Patrick Bowes-Lyon was born on 22 September 1884 at St Paul's Walden Bury, Hertfordshire to Claude, Lord Glamis, and Cecilia Cavendish-Bentinck. Styled as Master of Glamis from birth, he became Lord Glamis when his father inherited the earldom in 1904.

Strathmore and three of his three surviving brothers all served in World War I. He was a major in 1/5th Battalion, the Black Watch. His brothers John and Fergus also served with the Black Watch, the latter being killed in action at the Battle of Loos, while his younger brother Michael served with the Royal Scots and was taken as a prisoner of war.

On 19 June 1920, he was appointed a deputy lieutenant of Forfarshire (Angus from 1928). He succeeded his father as 15th and 2nd Earl of Strathmore and Kinghorne (15th earl in the peerage of Scotland and 2nd earl in the peerage of the United Kingdom) on 7 November 1944.

He was the eldest brother of Lady Elizabeth Bowes-Lyon (later Queen Elizabeth the Queen Mother), and thus an uncle of Queen Elizabeth II and Princess Margaret. As an uncle of the bride, Strathmore was a leading guest at the 1947 wedding of Princess Elizabeth and Philip Mountbatten.

== Marriage and issue ==
He married Lady Dorothy Beatrix Godolphin Osborne (3 December 1888 – 18 June 1946), daughter of George, 10th Duke of Leeds, on 21 November 1908 in London. They had four children:

- John Patrick Bowes-Lyon, Master of Glamis (1 January 1910 – 19 September 1941), killed in action, unmarried
- Lady Cecilia Bowes-Lyon (28 February 1912 – 20 March 1947) she was a bridesmaid at the wedding of Prince Albert, Duke of York, and Lady Elizabeth Bowes-Lyon on 26 April 1923. She married Major Kenneth Douglas Evelyn Herbert Harington (30 September 1911 – 13 January 2007) on 8 March 1939.
- Timothy Patrick Bowes-Lyon, 16th Earl of Strathmore and Kinghorne (18 March 1918 – 13 September 1972) married Mary Bridget Brennan (1923 – 8 September 1967) on 18 June 1958. They had one daughter who died in infancy.
- Lady Nancy Moira Bowes-Lyon (18 March 1918 – 11 February 1959) she married Lance Amigo Percy Burra Robinson (25 February 1917 – 21 June 2010) on 25 April 1940; they were divorced in 1950. They had two sons. She remarried John Michael Matheson Blair (25 May 1925 – 16 December 1955) in 1954.

== Death ==
Strathmore died on 25 May 1949 in Angus, surviving his wife by almost three years, aged 64. His personal estate was valued at £188,771 for probate in February 1950, with a further grant issued in March 1950 for Settled Land valued at £110,000.

He was succeeded by his second son, Timothy.

== Ancestry ==
Ancestors of Patrick Bowes-Lyon, 15th Earl of Strathmore and Kinghorne

8. Thomas Lyon-Bowes, Lord Glamis
4. Claude Bowes-Lyon, 13th Earl of Strathmore and Kinghorne
9. Charlotte Grimstead
2. Claude Bowes-Lyon, 14th Earl of Strathmore and Kinghorne
10. Oswald Smith
5. Frances Dora Smith
11. Henrietta Mildred Hodgson
1. Patrick Bowes-Lyon, 15th Earl of Strathmore and Kinghorne
12. Lord Charles Bentinck
6. Charles Cavendish-Bentinck
13. Anne Wellesley
3. Cecilia Cavendish-Bentinck
14. Edwyn Burnaby
7. Caroline Louisa Burnaby
15. Anne Caroline Salisbury

Peerage of the United Kingdom
Preceded by Claude Bowes-Lyon	Earl of Strathmore and Kinghorne; 1944–1949	Succeeded by Timothy Bowes-Lyon
Peerage of Scotland
Preceded by Claude Bowes-Lyon	Earl of Strathmore and Kinghorne; 1944–1949	Succeeded by Timothy Bowes-Lyon
