= You can shed tears that she is gone =

Opening line of popular verse

"You can shed tears that she is gone..." is the opening line of a piece of popular verse, based on a short prose poem, "Remember Me", written in 1982 by English painter and poet David Harkins (born 14 November 1958). The verse – sometimes also known as "She Is Gone" – has often been given an anonymous attribution, but Harkins claimed his original authorship after it was chosen by Queen Elizabeth II as part of the funeral ceremony for her mother, Queen Elizabeth The Queen Mother, in April 2002. It has subsequently become a popular choice to be read at funeral ceremonies, although according to Harkins it was originally written about unrequited love, rather than death.

== Composition ==
At the time it was written, Harkins was a bakery worker and aspiring artist living in Carlisle, Cumbria. Writing in the Daily Mail in 2003, he said:

I was 23 when I first met Anne Lloyd, my inspiration for the poem I called 'Remember Me'. She was 16 and didn't know me, but I had seen her about and knocked on her door one evening in November 1981. Anne answered, and I introduced myself as a painter (painting was a hobby of mine back then) and asked her to pose. She agreed, and I returned on the Thursday evening, when I made feeble attempts to sketch Anne. This proved difficult as her mother was present throughout. Anne posed for me about eight times, and we met regularly for a couple of years and talked a great deal, though we never even kissed, which is probably why I poured all my feelings about her into my poetry. I completed 'Remember Me' in about March 1982...

Harkins' original piece, originally written in prose format, started with the line: "Do not shed tears when I have gone but smile instead because I have lived...". The more frequently used and widely published wording is "You can shed tears that she is gone or you can smile because she has lived..." Other lines in the modern version parallel, but differ from, Harkins' original. It is not clear by whom the changes were made.

== Publication and popularity ==
In the early 1980s Harkins sent the piece, with other poems, to various magazines and poetry publishers, without any immediate success. Eventually it was published in a small anthology in 1999. He later said: "I believe a copy of 'Remember Me' was lying around in some publishers/poetry magazine office way back, someone picked it up and after reading through the piece found it appropriate for a funeral/message of condolence."

The verse was used by the family of Margaret, the Dowager Viscountess De L'Isle – the grandmother of royal confidante Tiggy Legge-Bourke – for her funeral in February 2002. The Queen read the poem in the printed order of service, and was reportedly touched by its sentiments and "slightly upbeat tone". A Buckingham Palace spokesman said that the verse "very much reflected her thoughts on how the nation should celebrate the life of the Queen Mother. To move on." The piece was published as the preface to the order of service for the Queen Mother's funeral in Westminster Abbey on 9 April 2002, with authorship stated as "Anonymous".

According to a report in The Guardian:

Such was the popular mood (remember the queues across the bridges near Westminster Abbey) that the words of the poem, so plain as scarcely to be poetic, seemed to strike a chord. Not since Auden's 'Stop All the Clocks' in the film Four Weddings and a Funeral had a piece of funerary verse made such an impression on the nation. In the days immediately after the service, there was frantic correspondence and speculation about the poem's possible provenance. "Systems crashed and telephone lines were blocked at the Times," reported columnist Philip Howard, and the lines were attributed variously to Immanuel Kant, Joyce Grenfell and nameless Native Americans. "Anon" seemed the best bet.

Initial efforts to find the author of the anonymous verse, through the Poetry Society and other channels, proved fruitless, and it was suggested that the verse had been written for a magazine or greetings card manufacturer rather than by a known poet. It was reported that the verse had been circulating on the internet since at least 2000, and The Times said that it "had previously been used to mark the deaths of a 52-year-old Scottish alcoholic, a 15-year-old high school baseball player, and an Australian glam rock star killed in a helicopter crash." Commenting on the verse itself, Alan Jenkins, deputy editor of the Times Literary Supplement, said it was "a nothing piece of writing", and The Guardian's arts correspondent Justine Jordan said that, although it "struck a chord with many mourners... that does not mean it's any good". The Poet Laureate, Andrew Motion, said that its significance lay "not so much in the literary value but how much it means to the person involved".

Harkins' involvement in writing the verse was made public by his local newspaper, the News & Star, in September 2002. He told the Guardian that "the first I knew of it was during the week of the Queen Mother's funeral. We read it in the Times. The words were slightly different, but there it was... I was shocked. At first, I couldn't believe it. I felt proud, humbled. I wasn't aware that people were using it for words of comfort when they'd lost loved ones." He said that he had given up writing verse in 1984, commenting that "I was never a good writer, and my poetry wasn't very good either. I know that. I'm not bitter at all." Harkins said that he had originally written the poem down in the margin of his copy of Dylan Thomas' verse Once It Was The Colour Of Saying, but after reading of its use at the Queen Mother's funeral had removed the page and sent it as a gift to Prince Charles, who thanked him.

Although Harkins wrote a one-act community play performed in Carlisle in 1987, he gave up writing soon afterwards and worked in a food factory and as a cleaner. After he married, the couple moved to Silloth, and Harkins turned to visual art, principally painting nude and erotic portraits, many of his wife, and selling them online, as well as caring for the couple's disabled son. They later returned to live in Carlisle. He is not to be confused with an Edinburgh-born abstract artist also named David Harkins.
