= Michael Bowes-Lyon (British Army officer) =

British nobleman and army officer (1893–1953)

The Honourable Michael Bowes-Lyon JP DL
- Bowes-Lyon in 1927
- Born: Michael Claude Hamilton Bowes-Lyon; 1 October 1893; St Paul's Walden, Hertfordshire
- Died: 1 May 1953 (aged 59); Biggleswade, Bedfordshire
- Other name: Mickie
- Education: Magdalen College, Oxford
- Spouse: Elizabeth Cator (m. 1928)
- Children: Fergus Bowes-Lyon, 17th Earl of Strathmore and Kinghorne; Lady Mary Colman; Lady Patricia Tetley; Albemarle Bowes-Lyon
- Parents: Claude Bowes-Lyon, 14th Earl of Strathmore and Kinghorne (father); Cecilia Cavendish-Bentinck (mother)
- Relatives: Queen Elizabeth the Queen Mother (sister)
- Military career
- Allegiance: United Kingdom
- Branch: British Army
- Service years: 1914–1921
- Rank: Lieutenant Colonel
- Unit: Royal Scots
- Conflicts: World War I

Michael Claude Hamilton Bowes-Lyon (1 October 1893 – 1 May 1953), known as Mickie Bowes-Lyon, was an elder brother of Queen Elizabeth the Queen Mother and maternal uncle of Queen Elizabeth II. He was a British Army officer during World War I, and was prisoner of war at Holzminden.

== Biography ==
Bowes-Lyon was born on 1 October 1893, the fifth son and eighth child of Claude Bowes-Lyon, Lord Glamis, later 14th Earl of Strathmore and Kinghorne, and Cecilia Cavendish-Bentinck. Nicknamed Mickie, he was educated at Eton College. He later studied at Magdalen College, Oxford.

During World War I, Bowes-Lyon served in France in The Royal Scots (Lothian Regiment). He was reported missing in action on 28 April 1917. Three weeks later, his family discovered he had been captured after being wounded. He was held as a prisoner of war at Holzminden prisoner-of-war camp for the rest of the war. He relinquished his commission in 1921.

After the war, Bowes-Lyon was a justice of the peace and deputy lieutenant of Bedfordshire. He resided at Gastlings near Biggleswade.

In 1928, Bowes-Lyon married Elizabeth Margaret "Betty" Cator (1899–1959), daughter of John Cator, at St George's, Hanover Square. Cator had been a bridesmaid at his sister Elizabeth's wedding to Prince Albert, Duke of York, in 1923. They had two sons and twin daughters:

- Fergus Michael Claude Bowes-Lyon (31 December 1928 – 19 August 1987), later 17th Earl of Strathmore and Kinghorne
- Mary Cecilia Bowes-Lyon (30 January 1932 – 2 January 2021)
- Patricia Maud Bowes-Lyon (30 January 1932 – 1 April 1995)
- Michael Albemarle Bowes-Lyon (29 May 1940 – 30 October 2023)

In later life, following the death of his brother, the 15th Earl of Strathmore and Kinghorne, he was heir presumptive to his nephew, the 16th Earl of Strathmore and Kinghorne. Bowes-Lyon predeceased him and the earldom was inherited by his eldest son, Fergus, in 1972. His younger children received the title and precedence of the children of an earl by royal warrant of precedence in 1974.

Bowes-Lyon died on 1 May 1953 at his home in Biggleswade as the result of asthma. His health had never fully recovered from his experience as a prisoner of war. He was buried in the churchyard of Glamis Parish Church.
