= Mary Bowes-Lyon, Countess of Strathmore and Kinghorne =

British noblewoman (1932–2025)

The Right Honourable The Countess of Strathmore and Kinghorne DL
- Born: Mary Pamela McCorquodale; 21 May 1932; Mayfair, London, England
- Died: 28 April 2025 (aged 92); Scottish Borders, Scotland
- Spouse: Fergus Bowes-Lyon, 17th Earl of Strathmore and Kinghorne (m. 1956; died 1987)
- Children: Michael Bowes-Lyon, 18th Earl of Strathmore and Kinghorne; Lady Elizabeth Leeming; Lady Diana Godfrey-Faussett

Mary Pamela Bowes-Lyon, Countess of Strathmore and Kinghorne (née McCorquodale; 21 May 1932 – 28 April 2025) was a British peeress and châtelaine of Glamis Castle.

== Early life and education ==
Mary was born on 21 May 1932 at her grandparents' house in Mayfair, London. Her father, Brigadier Norman Duncan McCorquodale MC (1898–1971), was the grandson of George McCorquodale, founder of McCorquodale & Company Limited, once one of the largest publishing houses in the United Kingdom. She was raised at Braehead House, west of Edinburgh, until her father inherited Winslow Hall in Buckinghamshire.

She was educated at home with a governess before attending finishing school at Brondesbury-at-Stocks and in Paris. She was presented to George VI in 1950.

== Marriage and family ==
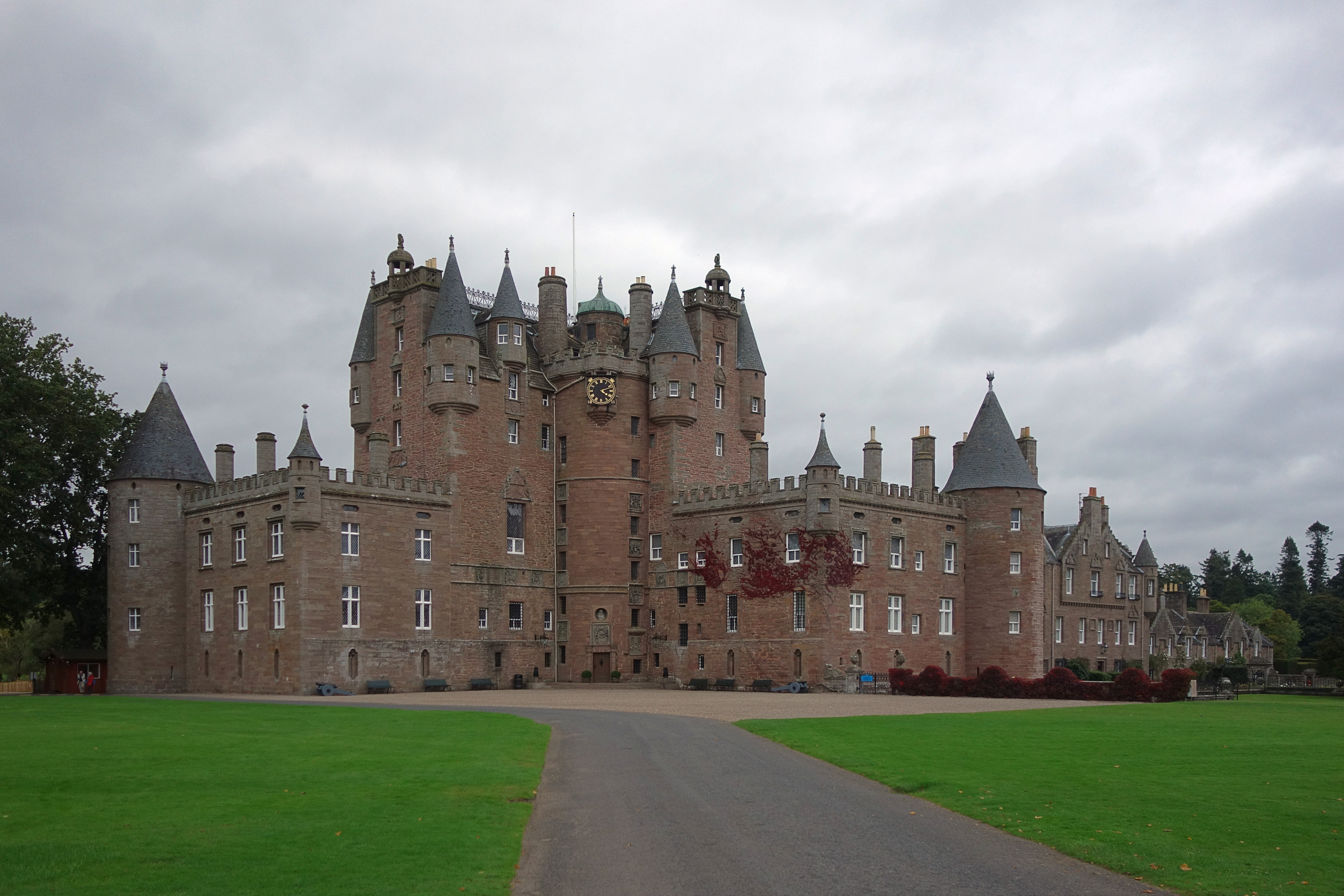
Glamis Castle

Mary met Captain Fergus Bowes-Lyon, then an officer in the Scots Guards, in Germany in 1955. They were married at St Margaret's, Westminster, on 10 April 1956 in a ceremony attended by the groom's aunt, Queen Elizabeth The Queen Mother, and cousins, Queen Elizabeth II and Princess Margaret. The couple settled in the White House on his cousin's Glamis Castle estate. They had three children:

- Michael Fergus Bowes-Lyon, 18th Earl of Strathmore and Kinghorne (7 June 1957 – 27 February 2016)
- Lady Elizabeth Mary Cecilia Bowes-Lyon (born 23 December 1959); she married Anthony Leeming in 1990.
- Lady Diana Evelyn Bowes-Lyon (born 29 December 1966); she married Christopher Godfrey-Faussett in 1995.

On 13 September 1972, her husband succeeded his cousin as 17th and 4th Earl of Strathmore and Kinghorne, thus Mary became Countess of Strathmore and Kinghorne. The Strathmores moved into Glamis Castle at Easter in 1975. Mary and her husband made improvements to the castle's visitor areas as well as their private living quarters.

Mary was widowed on 19 August 1987, when her husband collapsed while shooting grouse on the grounds of Glamis Castle and died en route to hospital. He was succeeded by their son, Michael.

== Later life ==
On 11 May 1989, she was appointed a deputy lieutenant of Angus, a role held by her late husband. In 2002, she was granted an honorary Doctor of Laws from the University of Dundee. In 2005, she hosted the wives of world leaders attending the 31st G8 summit at Glamis.

Through her role as president of the Tayside Space School, Mary came to befriend a number of NASA astronauts. Alvin Drew made a telephone call to the Countess from the International Space Station on the final voyage of the Space Shuttle Discovery. In 2011, he became her co-chieftain of the Glamis Highland Games. Another, James F. Reilly, was married in the private chapel at Glamis and christened his children there. Reilly presented the chapel with a Celtic cross made from a silver medallion that had been to space.

Styled as Dowager Countess of Strathmore and Kinghorne since her husband's death in 1987, she died on 28 April 2025, at the age of 92.
