= Timothy Bowes-Lyon, 16th Earl of Strathmore and Kinghorne =

British nobleman and peer

The Right Honourable The Earl of Strathmore and Kinghorne
- Born: Timothy Patrick Bowes-Lyon; 18 March 1918; Teesdale, County Durham, England
- Died: 13 September 1972 (aged 54); Glamis Castle, Angus, Scotland
- Spouse: Mary Bridget Brennan (m. 1958; died 1967)
- Children: Lady Caroline Bowes-Lyon
- Father: Patrick Bowes-Lyon, 15th Earl of Strathmore and Kinghorne

Timothy Patrick Bowes-Lyon, 16th and 3rd Earl of Strathmore and Kinghorne (18 March 1918 – 13 September 1972), was a British nobleman and peer. He was a nephew of Queen Elizabeth the Queen Mother, wife of King George VI, thus a first cousin of Queen Elizabeth II and Princess Margaret.

== Biography ==
Born on 18 March 1918 in Teesdale, County Durham, he was the second son and third child of Patrick, Lord Glamis, and Lady Dorothy Osborne (1888–1946). His paternal grandparents were Claude, 14th Earl of Strathmore and Kinghorne, and Cecilia Cavendish-Bentinck, and his maternal grandfather was George, 10th Duke of Leeds. His father's youngest sister was the future Queen Elizabeth the Queen Mother.

He was educated at Stowe School and after serving with their cadet contingent, received a commission in the Black Watch on 29 October 1937. His older brother John was killed in action in World War II in 1941. After his father succeeded his grandfather as 15th and 2nd Earl of Strathmore and Kinghorne in 1944, he was styled as Lord Glamis. On 25 May 1949, he succeeded his father and became 16th and 3rd Earl of Strathmore and Kinghorne.

On 18 June 1958, Strathmore married Mary Bridget Brennan (c. 1923–1967), an Irish nurse, at Glamis Castle, much to the dismay of his family. She renounced her Roman Catholic faith upon marrying him. They had one daughter, Lady Caroline Frances Bowes-Lyon (8 December 1959 – 1 January 1960), who died less than one month after her birth. His wife died on 8 September 1967 in "mysterious circumstances".

Strathmore died at home on 13 September 1972, aged 54. He had no sons, so was succeeded by his first cousin, Captain Fergus Bowes-Lyon.

Peerage of the United Kingdom
Preceded by Patrick Bowes-Lyon	Earl of Strathmore and Kinghorne; 1949–1972	Succeeded by Fergus Bowes-Lyon
Peerage of Scotland
Preceded by Patrick Bowes-Lyon	Earl of Strathmore and Kinghorne; 1949–1972	Succeeded by Fergus Bowes-Lyon
