= Choir of Westminster Abbey =

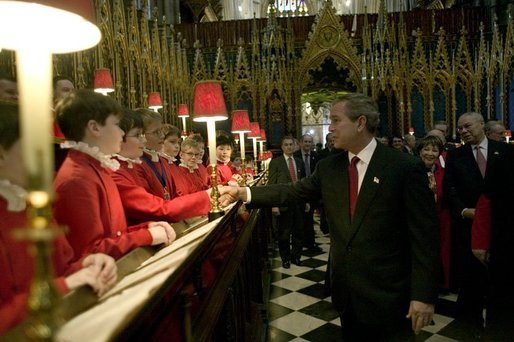

The Choir of Westminster Abbey comprises up to thirty boys (all of whom attend Westminster Abbey Choir School) and twelve professional adult singers, known as Lay Vicars.

The choir takes part in state and national occasions as well as singing evensong every day (except Wednesday).

The organist and master of the choristers is Andrew Nethsingha. Before his appointment to Westminster Abbey, Nethsingha spent fifteen years as Director of Music at St John's College, Cambridge.
