= Fergus Bowes-Lyon, 17th Earl of Strathmore and Kinghorne =

British nobleman and peer

The Right Honourable The Earl of Strathmore and Kinghorne DL

Member of the House of Lords
- Lord Temporal
- Hereditary peerage 13 September 1972 – 19 August 1987
- Preceded by: Timothy Bowes-Lyon, 16th Earl of Strathmore and Kinghorne
- Succeeded by: Michael Bowes-Lyon, 18th Earl of Strathmore and Kinghorne

Personal details
- Born: Fergus Michael Claude Bowes-Lyon; 31 December 1928
- Died: 19 August 1987 (aged 58) Glamis, Angus, Scotland
- Spouse: Mary McCorquodale (m. 1956)
- Children: 3; including Michael
- Parent: Michael Bowes-Lyon (father)
- Relatives: Queen Elizabeth the Queen Mother (paternal aunt); Elizabeth II (first cousin)

Fergus Michael Claude Bowes-Lyon, 17th and 4th Earl of Strathmore and Kinghorne (31 December 1928 – 19 August 1987) was a British landowner and peer. He was a nephew of Queen Elizabeth the Queen Mother, thus a first cousin of Queen Elizabeth II.

== Early life and family ==
Born on 31 December 1928, Strathmore was the eldest son of Michael Claude Hamilton Bowes-Lyon and Elizabeth Margaret Cator (1899–1959). His paternal grandparents were the 14th Earl and Countess of Strathmore and Kinghorne, and his maternal grandfather was John Cator, Conservative MP for Huntingdon. He had two younger sisters, Mary and Patricia, and a younger brother, Albemarle.

He attended the Royal Military Academy Sandhurst and was commissioned in the Scots Guards on 2 September 1949. In 1953, during the coronation of his cousin, Queen Elizabeth II, he was one of many servicemen lining the processional route. He served as a captain with the Second Battalion of the regiment in Germany.

Strathmore, then Captain Fergus Bowes-Lyon, married Mary Pamela McCorquodale (31 May 1932 – 28 April 2025) at St Margaret's, Westminster, on 10 April 1956 in a ceremony attended by his cousin, the Queen. His widow died on 28 April 2025. They had three children:

- Michael Fergus Bowes-Lyon, 18th Earl of Strathmore and Kinghorne (7 June 1957 – 27 February 2016)
- Lady Elizabeth Mary Cecilia Bowes-Lyon (born 23 December 1959)
- Lady Diana Evelyn Bowes-Lyon (born 29 December 1966)

== Later life ==
He became 17th and 4th Earl of Strathmore and Kinghorne upon the death of his first cousin, Timothy, 16th and 3rd Earl of Strathmore and Kinghorne, on 13 September 1972. He sat in the House of Lords as a Conservative. He and his wife made improvements to the visitors' areas at Glamis Castle, their seat in Angus. On 6 August 1973, Strathmore was appointed a deputy lieutenant of Angus, later serving as a vice lieutenant for the Tayside Region. Additional appointments he held included honorary colonel of the Tayforth Universities Officers' Training Corps from 1974 to 1982.

On 19 August 1987, Strathmore collapsed while shooting grouse on the grounds of Glamis Castle and died en route to hospital. He was succeeded by his son, Michael.

Peerage of the United Kingdom
Preceded by Timothy Bowes-Lyon	Earl of Strathmore and Kinghorne; 1972–1987	Succeeded by Michael Bowes-Lyon
Peerage of Scotland
Preceded by Timothy Bowes-Lyon	Earl of Strathmore and Kinghorne; 1972–1987	Succeeded by Michael Bowes-Lyon
