= Claude Bowes-Lyon, 14th Earl of Strathmore and Kinghorne =

British peer and landowner (1855–1944)

The Right Honourable The Earl of Strathmore and Kinghorne KG KT GCVO TD
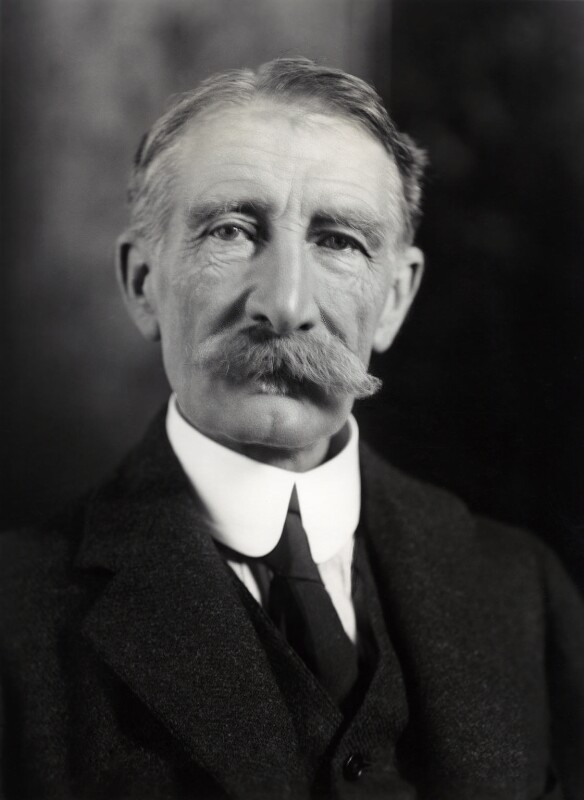
- The Earl in 1923
- Born: Claude George Bowes-Lyon; 14 March 1855; Belgravia, Middlesex, England
- Died: 7 November 1944 (aged 89); Glamis, Angus, Scotland
- Buried: Glamis Castle
- Spouse: Cecilia Cavendish-Bentinck (m. 1881; died 1938)
- Issue: Violet Bowes-Lyon; Mary Elphinstone, Lady Elphinstone; Patrick Bowes-Lyon, 15th Earl of Strathmore and Kinghorne; John Bowes-Lyon; Alexander Bowes-Lyon; Fergus Bowes-Lyon; Rose Leveson-Gower, Countess Granville; Michael Bowes-Lyon; Elizabeth, Queen of the United Kingdom; Sir David Bowes-Lyon
- Father: Claude Bowes-Lyon, 13th Earl of Strathmore and Kinghorne
- Mother: Frances Dora Smith

Claude George Bowes-Lyon, 14th and 1st Earl of Strathmore and Kinghorne (14 March 1855 – 7 November 1944), styled as Lord Glamis from 1865 to 1904, was a British peer and landowner who was the father of Queen Elizabeth the Queen Mother and the maternal grandfather of Queen Elizabeth II.

== Biography ==
=== Early life ===
Claude George Bowes-Lyon was born on 14 March 1855 in Lowndes Square, London, the son of Claude Bowes-Lyon, 13th Earl of Strathmore and Kinghorne, and the former Frances Smith. His younger brother, Patrick Bowes-Lyon, was a tennis player who won the 1887 Wimbledon doubles.

After being educated at Eton College, he received a commission in the 2nd Life Guards in 1876 and served for six years until the year after his marriage. He was an active member of the Territorial Army and served as honorary colonel of the 4th/5th Battalion of the Black Watch.

=== Estates and inheritance ===
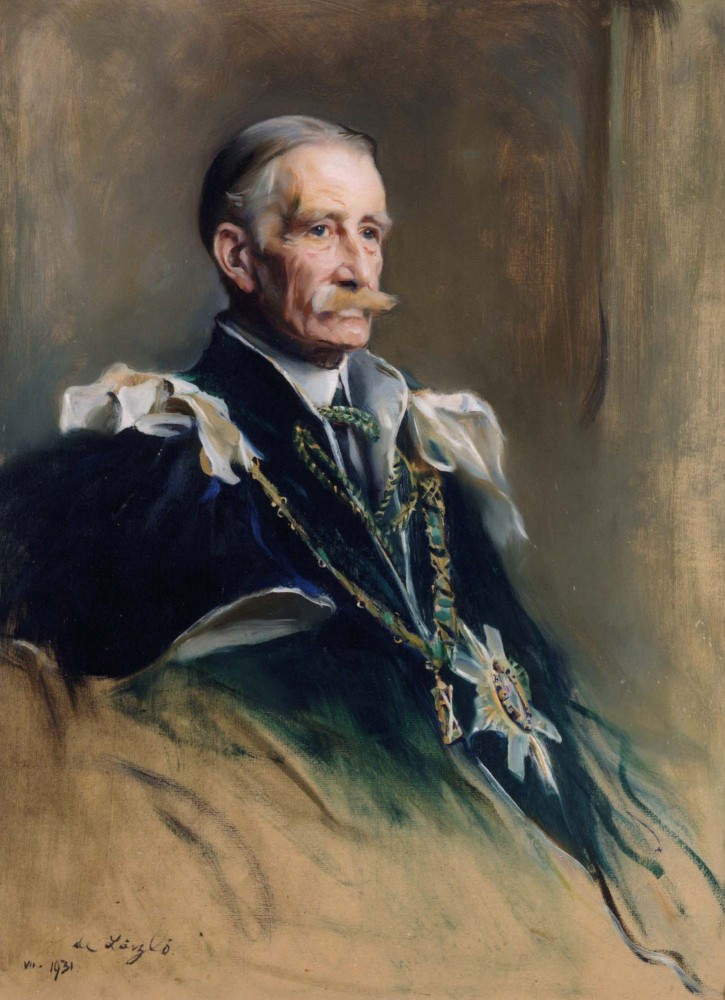
Portrait by Philip de László, 1931

Upon succeeding his father to the Earldom on 16 February 1904, he inherited large estates in Scotland and England, including Glamis Castle, St Paul's Walden Bury, Gibside Hall and Streatlam Castle in County Durham and Woolmers Park, near Hertford. The valuation of the entailed Strathmore Estates was £716,150 for the assessment of death duties following his father's death in 1904.

He was made Lord Lieutenant of Angus, (Note: The county of Angus was called Forfarshire until 1928.) an office he resigned when his daughter became queen. He had a keen interest in forestry and was one of the first to grow larch from seed in Britain. His estates had a large number of smallholders, and he had a reputation for being unusually kind to his tenants. His contemporaries described him as an unpretentious man, often seen in "an old macintosh tied with a piece of twine". He worked his own land and enjoyed physical labour on the grounds of his estates; visitors often mistook him for a common labourer. He made his own cocoa for breakfast, and always had a jug of water by his place at dinner so he could dilute his own wine.

In 1922 The Daily Telegraph reported that Lord Strathmore was selling the Streatlam Castle estate on the Yorkshire and Durham borders; the asking price for the Castle and 1,198 surrounding acres was reportedly £37,500, with an option to purchase the remaining 4,806 acres.

==== London homes ====
Prior to 1906 Lord Strathmore and his family used a flat in Grosvenor Gardens as their London residence; following his succession to the Earldom in 1904, in 1906 he acquired the lease of a large townhouse at No. 20 St James's Square from Sir Watkin Williams-Wynn, 7th Baronet, which remained as the family's London residence until 1920. Strathmore was elected as one of the Trustees of St James's Square in 1908. A temporary lease was then taken over a house in Eaton Square, and by April 1921 a lease of 17 Bruton Street, Mayfair, had been acquired and renovations were underway in preparation for the Bowes-Lyon family's occupation of the house. The family were residing at Bruton Street when in London by March 1922. Strathmore sold the lease of 17 Bruton Street in early 1929; the Evening Standard reported on 26 March that the Strathmores would vacate the property in mid-April of that year, and that the reported purchase price of the house's freehold was £26,000.

By January 1930 Lord and Lady Strathmore had taken a new London residence at No. 84 Eaton Square, which they continued to occupy until Lady Strathmore's death in 1938. During the late 1930s Lord Strathmore also leased an apartment in Cumberland Mansions, Marylebone.

=== Marriage and family ===
He married Cecilia Cavendish-Bentinck on 16 July 1881 in Petersham, Surrey. The couple had ten children. The Earl would part his moustache in a theatrical, but courteous gesture, before kissing them:

Name	Birth	Death	Age	Notes
The Hon. Violet Hyacinth Bowes-Lyon	17 April 1882	17 October 1893	11 years	She died from diphtheria and was buried at St Andrew's Church, Ham. She was never styled 'Lady' because she died before her father succeeded to the Earldom.
Lady Mary Frances Bowes-Lyon	30 August 1883	8 February 1961	77 years	She married Sidney Elphinstone, 16th Lord Elphinstone; in 1910, and had issue.
Patrick Bowes-Lyon, Lord Glamis	22 September 1884	25 May 1949	64 years	He married Lady Dorothy Osborne (daughter of George Osborne, 10th Duke of Leeds) in 1908, and had issue. In 1944, he became 15th and 2nd Earl of Strathmore and Kinghorne.
Lieutenant The Hon. John Bowes-Lyon	1 April 1886	7 February 1930	43 years	Known as Jock, he married The Hon. Fenella Hepburn-Stuart-Forbes-Trefusis (daughter of Charles Hepburn-Stuart-Forbes-Trefusis, 21st Baron Clinton) in 1914, and had issue.
The Hon. Alexander Francis Bowes-Lyon	14 April 1887	19 October 1911	24 years	Known as Alec, he died in his sleep of a tumour at the base of the cerebrum, unmarried.
Captain The Hon. Fergus Bowes-Lyon	18 April 1889	27 September 1915	26 years	He married Lady Christian Norah Dawson-Damer (daughter of George Dawson-Damer, 5th Earl of Portarlington) in 1914, and had issue. He was killed in the early stages of the Battle of Loos.
Lady Rose Constance Bowes-Lyon	6 May 1890	17 November 1967	77 years	She married William Leveson-Gower, 4th Earl Granville in 1916, and had issue.
Lieutenant-Colonel The Hon. Michael Claude Hamilton Bowes-Lyon	1 October 1893	1 May 1953	59 years	Known as Mickie, he was a prisoner of war (at Holzminden prisoner-of-war camp) during World War I. He married Elizabeth Cator in 1928. She was a bridesmaid at the wedding of Prince Albert, Duke of York, and Lady Elizabeth Bowes-Lyon on 26 April 1923. Their children were Fergus Bowes-Lyon, 17th Earl of Strathmore and Kinghorne, Lady Mary Colman, Lady Patricia Tetley and Albemarle Bowes-Lyon. He died of asthma and heart failure in Bedfordshire.
Lady Elizabeth Angela Marguerite Bowes-Lyon	4 August 1900	30 March 2002	101 years	In 1923, she married the Duke of York, the future King George VI, and had issue, including Queen Elizabeth II. She became queen consort in 1936, and in later life, after the death of her husband, she was known as Queen Elizabeth the Queen Mother.
The Hon. Sir David Bowes-Lyon	2 May 1902	13 September 1961	59 years	He married Rachel Clay in 1929, and had issue.

==== Father of the Queen Consort ====
Despite the Earl's reservations about royalty, in April 1923, his youngest daughter, Elizabeth, married Prince Albert, Duke of York, the second son of King George V and Queen Mary. Lord Strathmore was made a Knight Grand Cross of the Royal Victorian Order to mark the marriage. His granddaughter, Princess Elizabeth (later Queen Elizabeth II), was born at his home, 17 Bruton Street, Mayfair in April 1926. In 1928, he was made a Knight of the Thistle.

In 1936, his son-in-law became king and assumed the name George VI. As the father of the new Queen, he was created a Knight Companion of the Garter and the 1st Earl of Strathmore and Kinghorne, a United Kingdom peerage in the Coronation Honours of 1937 (although he was the 14th Earl of Strathmore and Kinghorne, which was a Scottish title). This enabled him to sit in the House of Lords as an earl (because members of the peerage of Scotland did not automatically sit in the House of Lords, he had previously sat only as a baron through the Barony of Bowes created for his father). At the coronation of his daughter and son-in-law, the Earl and Countess sat in the royal box with Queen Mary and their shared granddaughters, Princesses Elizabeth and Margaret.

=== Later life and death ===
He was created a Companion of the Roll of Honour of the Memorial of Merit of King Charles the Martyr in 1911. Later in life, the Earl became extremely deaf. Lord Strathmore died of bronchitis on 7 November 1944, aged 89, at Glamis Castle. (Lady Strathmore had died in 1938.) His will was proved for probate in August 1945, with a personal estate valued at £75,955.

He outlived four of his ten children and was succeeded by his son, Patrick Bowes-Lyon, Lord Glamis.

== Arms ==
Coat of arms of the Earl of Strathmore and Kinghorne
Coronet An Earl's Coronet Crest Within two branches of laurel a lady to the girdle habited and holding in her right hand the royal thistle all proper. Escutcheon Quarterly 1 and 4 argent a lion rampant azure, armed and langued gules within a double tressure flory counter-flory of the second (for Lyon); 2 and 3 ermine three bows stringed palewise in fess proper (for Bowes). Supporters Dexter, a unicorn argent armed and unguled or; Sinister, a lion per fess or and gules. Motto In Te, Domine, Speravi Symbolism The Arms of the Earls of Strathmore and Kinghorne are famous for being canting as they represent the name of the holders of the title: Bowes-Lyon in that they feature bows and lions.

== Footnotes ==
Honorary titles
Preceded by Claude Bowes-Lyon	Lord Lieutenant of Angus; 1904–1936	Succeeded by The Earl of Airlie
Peerage of Scotland
Preceded by Claude Bowes-Lyon	Earl of Strathmore and Kinghorne; 1904–1944	Succeeded by Patrick Bowes-Lyon
Peerage of the United Kingdom
New creation	Earl of Strathmore and Kinghorne; 1937–1944	Succeeded by Patrick Bowes-Lyon
