= Cecilia Bowes-Lyon, Countess of Strathmore and Kinghorne =

British peeress (1862–1938)

The Right Honourable The Countess of Strathmore and Kinghorne GCVO
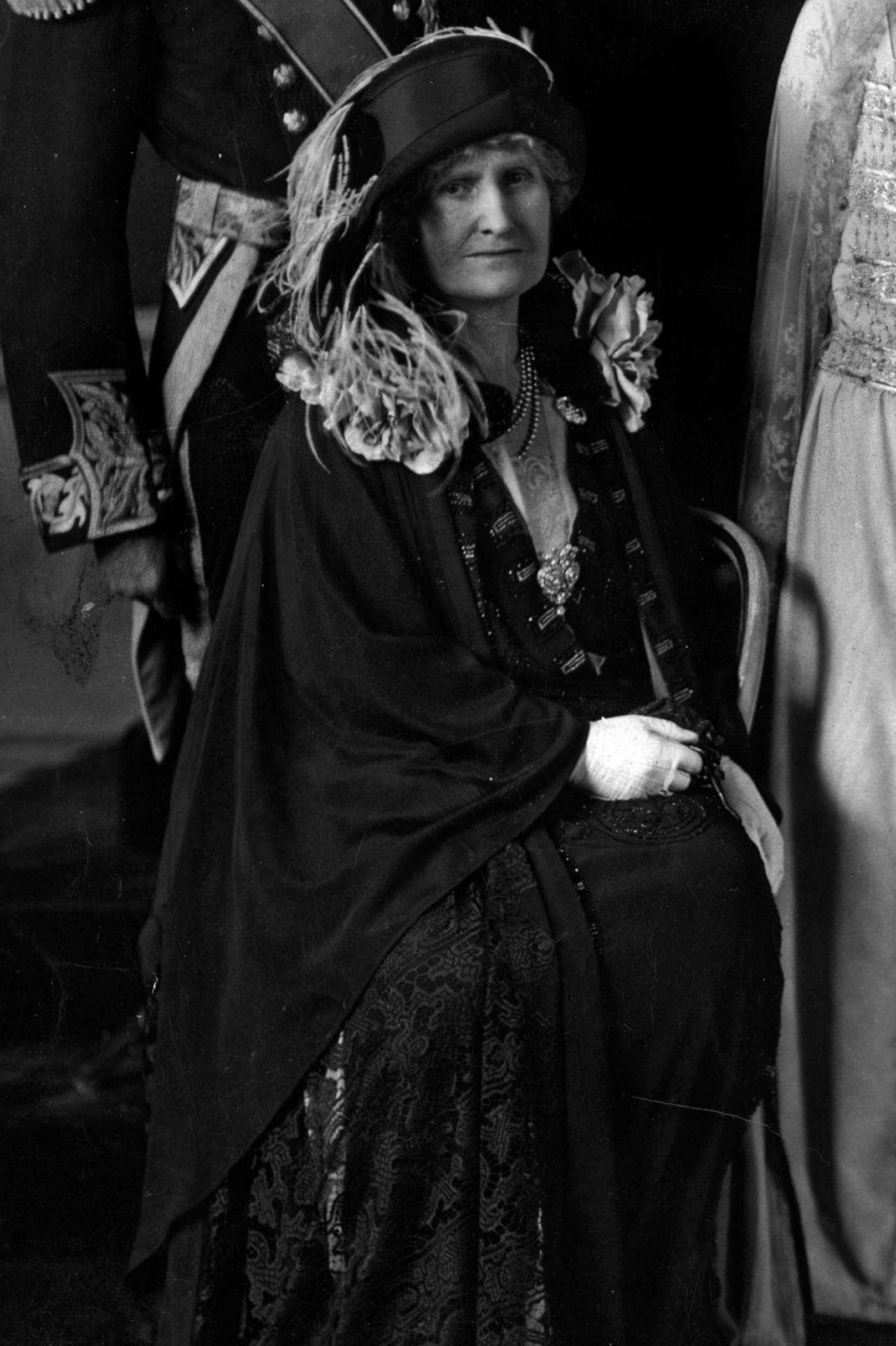
- The Countess in 1923, during the wedding of Prince Albert and Lady Elizabeth Bowes-Lyon, her son-in-law and daughter
- Born: Cecilia Nina Cavendish-Bentinck; 11 September 1862; Belgravia, Middlesex, England
- Died: 23 June 1938 (aged 75); Marylebone, London, England
- Buried: Glamis Castle
- Noble family: Bentinck
- Spouse: Claude Bowes-Lyon, 14th Earl of Strathmore and Kinghorne (m. 1881)
- Issue: Violet Bowes-Lyon; Mary Elphinstone, Lady Elphinstone; Patrick Bowes-Lyon, 15th Earl of Strathmore and Kinghorne; John Bowes-Lyon; Alexander Bowes-Lyon; Fergus Bowes-Lyon; Rose Leveson-Gower, Countess Granville; Michael Bowes-Lyon; Elizabeth, Queen of the United Kingdom; Sir David Bowes-Lyon
- Father: Charles Cavendish-Bentinck
- Mother: Caroline Louisa Burnaby

Cecilia Nina Bowes-Lyon, Countess of Strathmore and Kinghorne (née Cavendish-Bentinck; 11 September 1862 – 23 June 1938) was the mother of Queen Elizabeth the Queen Mother, and the maternal-grandmother of Queen Elizabeth II and Princess Margaret, Countess of Snowdon.

== Early life ==
Cecilia Nina Cavendish-Bentinck was born on 11 September 1862 at 50 Eaton Place in Belgravia, Westminster, the eldest daughter of the Rev. Charles Cavendish-Bentinck (grandson of British Prime Minister William Cavendish-Bentinck, 3rd Duke of Portland) and his wife Louisa (née Burnaby).

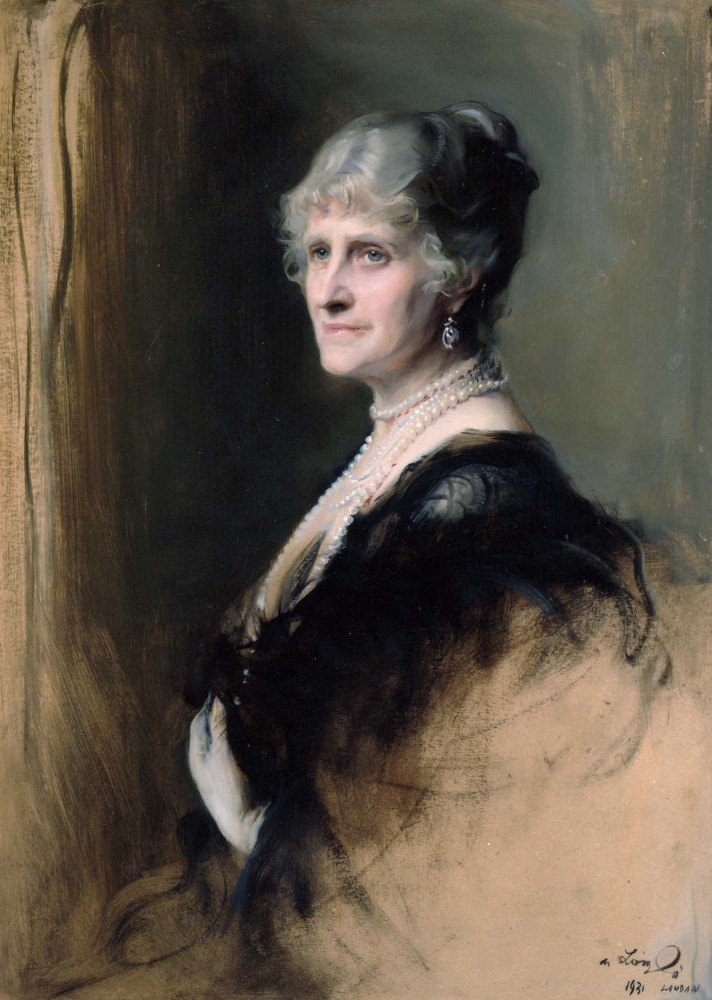
Portrait by Philip de László, 1931

On 16 July 1881, she married Claude Bowes-Lyon, Lord Glamis, at St Peter's Church, Petersham, Surrey. They had ten children. Claude inherited his father's title of Earl of Strathmore and Kinghorne in 1904, whereupon Cecilia became Countess of Strathmore and Kinghorne.

The Strathmore estates included two stately homes and their surroundings: Glamis Castle, where Cecilia designed the Italian garden, and St Paul's Walden Bury. Cecilia was described as a gregarious and accomplished hostess who played the piano well and managed her houses with care and a practical approach. According to The Times, she was deeply religious, a keen gardener and embroiderer, and preferred a quiet family life.

During World War I, Glamis Castle served as a convalescent hospital for the wounded, in which she took an active part until she developed cancer and was forced into invalidity. In October 1921 she underwent a hysterectomy, and by May 1922 was in recovery. In January 1923 she celebrated the engagement of her youngest daughter, Elizabeth, to the King's son, Prince Albert, Duke of York, later George VI. When asked by pressmen for a photograph during the Edward VIII abdication crisis, she reportedly said, "I shouldn't waste a photograph on me." At the coronation of their son-in-law and daughter, the Earl and Countess were seated in the royal box, along with the immediate royal family.

== Death ==
Lady Strathmore suffered a heart attack in April 1938 during the wedding of her granddaughter, Anne Bowes-Lyon (later Princess of Denmark), to Viscount Anson. She died eight weeks later on 23 June at 38 Cumberland Mansions, near Bryanston Square in London, aged 75. Lady Strathmore outlived four of her ten children. She was buried on 27 June at Glamis Castle.

== Children ==
Name	Birth	Death	Age	Notes
The Hon. Violet Hyacinth Bowes-Lyon	17 April 1882	17 October 1893	11 years	She died from diphtheria and was buried at St Andrew's Church, Ham. She was never styled 'Lady' because she died before her father succeeded to the Earldom.
Lady Mary Frances Bowes-Lyon	30 August 1883	8 February 1961	77 years	She married Sidney Elphinstone, 16th Lord Elphinstone; in 1910, and had issue.
Patrick Bowes-Lyon, Lord Glamis	22 September 1884	25 May 1949	64 years	He married Lady Dorothy Osborne (daughter of George Osborne, 10th Duke of Leeds) in 1908, and had issue. In 1944, he became 15th and 2nd Earl of Strathmore and Kinghorne.
Lieutenant The Hon. John Bowes-Lyon	1 April 1886	7 February 1930	43 years	Known as Jock, he married The Hon. Fenella Hepburn-Stuart-Forbes-Trefusis (daughter of Charles Hepburn-Stuart-Forbes-Trefusis, 21st Baron Clinton) in 1914, and had issue.
The Hon. Alexander Francis Bowes-Lyon	14 April 1887	19 October 1911	24 years	Known as Alec, he died in his sleep of a tumour at the base of the cerebrum, unmarried.
Captain The Hon. Fergus Bowes-Lyon	18 April 1889	27 September 1915	26 years	He married Lady Christian Norah Dawson-Damer (daughter of George Dawson-Damer, 5th Earl of Portarlington) in 1914, and had issue. He was killed in the early stages of the Battle of Loos.
Lady Rose Constance Bowes-Lyon	6 May 1890	17 November 1967	77 years	She married William Leveson-Gower, 4th Earl Granville in 1916, and had issue.
Lieutenant-Colonel The Hon. Michael Claude Hamilton Bowes-Lyon	1 October 1893	1 May 1953	59 years	Known as Mickie, he was a prisoner of war (at Holzminden prisoner-of-war camp) during World War I. He married Elizabeth Cator in 1928. She was a bridesmaid at the wedding of Prince Albert, Duke of York, and Lady Elizabeth Bowes-Lyon on 26 April 1923. Their children were Fergus Bowes-Lyon, 17th Earl of Strathmore and Kinghorne, Lady Mary Colman, Lady Patricia Tetley and Albemarle Bowes-Lyon. He died of asthma and heart failure in Bedfordshire.
Lady Elizabeth Angela Marguerite Bowes-Lyon	4 August 1900	30 March 2002	101 years	In 1923, she married the future King George VI, and had issue, including Queen Elizabeth II. She became queen consort and empress consort of India in 1936, and in later life, after the death of her husband, she was known as Queen Elizabeth the Queen Mother.
The Hon. Sir David Bowes-Lyon	2 May 1902	13 September 1961	59 years	He married Rachel Clay in 1929, and had issue.

== Ancestry ==
Ancestors of Cecilia Bowes-Lyon, Countess of Strathmore and Kinghorne

8. William Cavendish-Bentinck, 3rd Duke of Portland
4. Lord Charles Cavendish-Bentinck
9. Lady Dorothy Cavendish
2. Reverend Charles Cavendish-Bentinck
10. Richard Wellesley, 1st Marquess Wellesley
5. Anne Wellesley
11. Hyacinthe-Gabrielle Roland
1. Cecilia Bowes-Lyon, Countess of Strathmore and Kinghorne
12. Edwyn Andrew Burnaby, Sr.
6. Edwyn Burnaby
13. Mary Browne
3. Caroline Louisa Burnaby
14. Thomas Salisbury
7. Anne Caroline Salisbury
15. Frances Webb

== Sources ==
- Davies, Edward J., "Some Connections of the Birds of Warwickshire", The Genealogist, 26(2012):58–76
- Forbes, Grania, My Darling Buffy: The Early Life of The Queen Mother (Headline Book Publishing, 1999); ISBN 978-0-7472-7387-5
- Vickers, Hugo, Elizabeth: The Queen Mother (Arrow Books/Random House, 2006); ISBN 978-0-09-947662-7
