= Albemarle Bowes-Lyon =

British banker and aristocrat

The Honourable Albemarle Bowes-Lyon
- Born: Michael Albemarle Bowes-Lyon; 29 May 1940
- Died: 30 October 2023 (aged 83)
- Burial place: Glamis, Angus, Scotland
- Education: Eton College
- Alma mater: Magdalen College, Oxford
- Father: Michael Bowes-Lyon
- Relatives: Queen Elizabeth the Queen Mother (paternal aunt)
- Family: Bowes-Lyon family

Michael Albemarle Bowes-Lyon (29 May 1940 – 30 October 2023) was a British banker and nephew of Queen Elizabeth the Queen Mother.

== Biography ==
Bowes-Lyon was the second son and youngest child of Lieutenant-Colonel The Honourable Michael Claude Hamilton Bowes-Lyon (1893–1953) and Elizabeth Margaret Cator (1899–1959). His paternal grandfather was Claude, 14th Earl of Strathmore and Kinghorne. He had an elder brother, Fergus, and two older sisters, Mary and Patricia. He was born in Hertfordshire and raised in Bedfordshire. After his father's death in 1953, the family resided at the White House, Glamis.

He was page to his cousin, Princess Margaret, at the coronation of Queen Elizabeth II in 1953. That year, he began his studies at Eton College. He was also page to his aunt, the Queen Mother, when she was installed as chancellor of the University of London in November 1955. He later read French and German at Magdalen College, Oxford.

Bowes-Lyon was recruited to Coutts in 1963, later joining the board of directors in 1969. Owing to his education and connections, he was deployed to bank's German and French operations. He retired in 1993.

In 1972, his elder brother succeeded their cousin as 17th Earl of Strathmore and Kinghorne. Subsequently, Bowes-Lyon received the courtesy title The Honourable and precedence of the younger son of an earl by royal warrant of precedence on 15 February 1974. He was a favourite nephew of Queen Elizabeth the Queen Mother and a frequent guest of hers at Royal Lodge.

Bowes-Lyon died at the age of 83 on 30 October 2023. He was buried at Glamis.
