= Gardyne =

Gardyne is a Scottish surname from the county of Angus. The family or Clan Gardyne originated in the environs of Gardyne Castle; their seat was Friockheim, Angus, Scotland.

People with this surname include:

- Alexander Garden or Gardyne (c. 1585–c. 1642), Scottish poet
- John Gardyne of Lawton and Middleton (died after 1704), Scottish laird, MP for Angus in 1667
- Michael Gardyne (born 1986), Scottish footballer
- Thomas Gardyne of Middleton (1780–1841), Scottish landowner, founder of the village of Friockheim
- Alan David Greenhill Gardyne (1868–1953), Scottish army officer and laird of Finavon Finavon Castle (19th-century mansion) In his military career Gardyne gained the rank of Lieutenant-Colonel in the Gordon Highlanders.

== See also ==
- John Bruce-Gardyne, Baron Bruce-Gardyne, Conservative MP for Angus
- Lucinda Bruce-Gardyne, entrepreneur and cookery writer
