= Finavon =

Coordinates: 56.70676°N 2.8251577°W

Finavon (Scots pronunciation: [fɪˈneːvən]) is a small settlement and hamlet in the parish of Oathlaw Angus, Scotland, situated with the A90 road running through it and it also has the nearby River South Esk and Lemno Burn. Historically part of the ancient administrative heart of the Barony of Finhaven, the modern hamlet is though, distinct from the historic Milton of Finavon (The Mains). The majority of the original "Mains" farm and mill buildings were demolished around 1995 to make way for the executive housing scheme that now occupies the site. This new hamlet in Finavon is a residential cluster at Milton Lane (postcode DD8 3RH), which is legally distinct from the nearby listed property of Milton of Finavon.

== Notable buildings ==
The Old Finavon Castle a 12-13th Century Tower Castle. Now ruined after a catastrophic collapse around 1740.

The New Finavon Castle (19th-century mansion) Styled in the Victorian Scots Baronial fashion.

The ancient Finavon Doocot

Milton of Finavon (Finhaven). Originally a Tower Fortalice (watchtower) and Manor House. A post medieval complex that was altered over the centuries. It was the home of James Carnegy of Finhaven. He was a supporter of Glorious Revolution but was accused of being a Jacobite who was put on trial in 1716 and then pardoned. He in 1728 accidentally killed the 6th Earl of Strathmore. His subsequent trial reintroduced the Not Guilty verdict to Scots Law.

== Industry and Infrastructure ==
The settlement developed as a significant industrial hub centred on the Mills of Finhaven. In the mid-17th century the River South Esk became for industrialised along its length. The Victorian Ordnance Survey Name Books recorded two large stone-built mills on the site; the northern mill was appropriated for corn, while the southern building was dedicated to the manufacturing of flour.

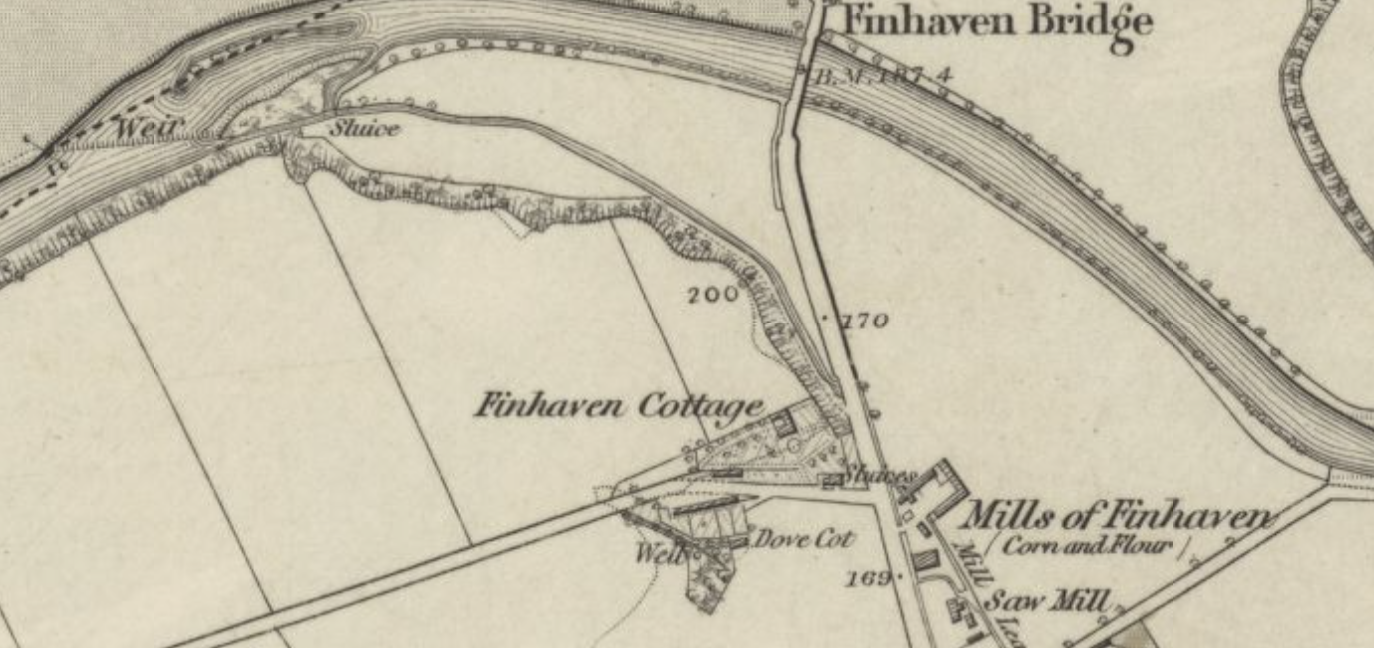
Detail of the Lemno Burn and River South Esk showing the industrial footprint of the Finhaven mills, accurately surveyed by the Ordnance Survey in 1861. Reproduced with the kind permission of the National Library of Scotland

These mills were powered by an extensive lade system drawn from the River South Esk to the NNW. The industrial works and the associated agricultural lands at the Haughs of Finhaven were historically part of the estate owned by the Carnegie Gardyne family.

== History ==
A Roman temporary camp was discovered at near Finavon in 1962 just north across the South River Esk, indicating ancient military activity in the Strathmore valley. To the south of the modern hamlet lie the ruins of the 12th-century Finavon Castle, which served as the seat of the Earl of Crawford before its abandonment in the early 18th century.
