= James Carnegie (died 1707) =

Scottish politician

James Carnegie of Finavon (1644 – 10 March 1707) was a member of the Parliament of Scotland. Recent records from the National Records of Scotland confirm he died in Edinburgh at the age of 63. He was the second son of David Carnegie, 2nd Earl of Northesk and served as a commissioner for Forfarshire. In 1674, he married Anna Lundin, daughter of Robert Maitland.

The second son of David Carnegie, 2nd Earl of Northesk, he was infeft on 6 June 1672. By contract of 10 February and June 1674, he married Anna Lundin, second daughter of Dame Margaret Lundin of that Ilk and Robert Maitland, brother of the Duke of Lauderdale. Their children were:

- Charles, who was "palsied" He died unmarried and without issue in 1712 at Whitewalls Tannadice.
- James, the second son, in whose favour Carnegie created an entail on 13 September 1703. It was not executed. Married Margaret Bennett Daughter of Sir William Bennett 1st Baronet of Grubet.
- Margaret, who married Patrick Lyon of Auchterhouse
- Jean, b.1685 who married m 15th November 1697 aged 12, her first cousin Alexander Blair (Carnegie) b1683 aged 14, of Kinfauns. Perthshire. Their marriage caused great scandal; their daughter Margaret married John Gray, 11th Lord Gray.

Anna Carnegie died on 3 September 1694.

== Edinburgh Residency ==
Throughout the 18th century, the Lairds of Finhaven maintained a winter presence in Edinburgh. By 1775, the family had moved to the newly developed New Town; James Carnegie (died 1777), grandson of the MP, is recorded as a resident of Princes Street. This residence was situated in the initial phase of the New Town development designed by James Craig and John Adam, the latter being the son of William Adam, who had previously modernised the family's country seat, the House of Finhaven.

Carnegie of Finavon represented Forfar from 1669 to 1674. He was made captain of a new company in the Scots Regiment of Guards on 25 August 1674 and served at the Battle of Bothwell Bridge before resigning his commission in 1680. He then served as commissioner for Forfarshire in 1686, from 1698 to 1702, and again from 1702 to 1707.

James Carnegie was styled as "Sir James Carnegie of Finhaven" in official state records, including a 1686 Parliamentary Warrant granting him the right to hold free fairs at Finhaven. This suggests he held a personal (non-hereditary) knighthood, likely awarded for his military or civil service.

== 1697 /98 Curatorship scandal and imprisonment ==
In 1697, Carnegie was involved in a landmark legal dispute before the Privy Council of Scotland regarding the curatorship of his minor relative, Alexander Blair (alias Carnegie) of Kinfauns. Having served as Blair's tutor (Guardian) during his pupillarity meaning aged 14 to 20, Carnegie was accused of using "violence" and "indirect practice" to prevent the free election of independent curators who would have audited his management of the Kinfauns estate.

According to a decreet dated 18 November 1697, Carnegie disrupted the Forfar Sheriff Court on 7 October by snatching Blair's nomination list from the clerk's hands. He was further accused of physically removing the minor from the court and falsifying the nomination papers—a process described as being "cutt, tailled and falsified"—to ensure he remained the sole curator. To secure his family's interest, Carnegie orchestrated a hurried marriage between Blair and his own daughter, Jean Carnegie, on 15 November 1697. Following an investigation, the Privy Council declared the election of curators null and void. Both Carnegie and Blair were subsequently imprisoned; Carnegie was committed to the Edinburgh Tolbooth for his "manifest riot" and "gross and palpable abuse" of the court.

=== 1698 Prosecution for illegal marriage ===
In February 1698, the case shifted to the prosecution of those involved in the clandestine marriage. The Privy Council pursued Rev John Grub, the minister of Oathlaw who had performed the ceremony; after he failed to appear, he was declared a "rebel" and his moveable goods were escheated to the Crown. The proceedings included the testimony of Anna Carnegie, Jean's twelve-year-old sister, as a witness.

While the Council referred the spiritual validity of the marriage to the church courts, it maintained jurisdiction over the civil "riot" and the illegal conduct of Carnegie and his servant, Janet Brown. Alexander Blair, having been released from state custody at Edinburgh Castle, appeared personally as a pursuer against Carnegie to challenge the union. Carnegie's imprisonment ended following the provision of a legal bond, which was formally discharged on 5 April 1698.

=== 1698 Legal transition and release of bond ===
By early 1698, the legal focus shifted from the state's prosecution to civil processes led by Alexander Blair. James Carnegie had initially provided a financial bond on 1 January 1698, with John Scott of Logie as his guarantor, to secure his release from the Tolbooth and ensure his attendance at court. Following the initiation of new legal proceedings by Blair, a second bond was provided in March 1698. On 5 April 1698, the Privy Council authorized the return of the original January bond to Carnegie, as the newer legal guarantees were deemed sufficient to cover the ongoing litigation regarding the Kinfauns estate and marriage. By April 1698, the legal proceedings against Carnegie transitioned from a criminal prosecution by the Lord Advocate to civil actions led by Alexander Blair himself. Carnegie had initially been released from the Tolbooth under a financial bond provided in January 1698. However, on 5 April 1698, the Privy Council authorized the return of this original bond, as Carnegie had provided new legal guarantees for the ongoing civil litigation regarding the Kinfauns estate and his marriage.

In September 1703, Carnegie successfully petitioned the Privy Council to recover a fine of £150 sterling that had been imposed during the 1697 proceedings. He argued that the marriage between his daughter and Alexander Blair had been "natural and ordinary" and "every way suitable." Leveraging a general indemnity granted by Queen Anne, Carnegie claimed that because the fine had been consigned to the court rather than paid to the Blair family, it should be refunded. The Council granted the petition, effectively ending the financial repercussions of the scandal.

=== The Sham Marriage of his Daughter ===
The ceremony was performed by John Grub, an Episcopalian "intruder" minister at Oathlaw and a known Jacobite sympathiser. Grub's status as an illegal minister, outside the jurisdiction of the established Church of Scotland, facilitated the clandestine nature of the union. For his role in the marriage and his failure to appear before the Council, Grub was declared a fugitive and an outlaw (put to the horn) in March 1698.On 3 March 1698, the Privy Council issued a formal warrant for the arrest of Mr John Grub, described as the minister "sometime at Oathlaw." The warrant commanded all Scottish sheriffs and magistrates to seize Grub and convoy him under guard to the Edinburgh Tolbooth to await further legal proceedings for his role in the clandestine marriage of Alexander Blair and Jean Carnegie.

=== Death of Sir James Carnegie of Finhaven ===
He died at Edinburgh and was buried in the Abbey Church.
