= Patrick Lyon of Auchterhouse =

Scottish politician

Patrick Lyon of Auchterhouse (1669 – 13 November 1715) was a Scottish politician.

He was the second son of Patrick Lyon, 3rd Earl of Strathmore and Kinghorne and his wife Helen, daughter of John Middleton, 1st Earl of Middleton. He married his second cousin Margaret, daughter of James Carnegie of Finavon Castle, the marriage without issue.

== Jacobite Uprising ==
Auchterhouse was a committed Jacobite and a Scottish warrant was issued in 1707 for his arrest for High Treason. The Union prevented his arrest as the parliament was dissolved after the union was enacted. "Warrants Issued for High Treason". National Records of Scotland. Privy Council Warrants (78), signed and sealed by Privy Council, (GD26/7/128).

During the 1715 Jacobite Uprising, Lyon served as a recruiter for the rebel forces at Perth. A letter dated 24 October 1715 from Lyon to his brother-in-law, James Carnegie of Finhaven, demonstrates the coercive measures used to secure support. In the correspondence, Lyon warns Carnegy that his reluctance to join the camp at Perth had "enraged" their associates and that his house House of Finavon and estate at Finhaven would be "burnt" and ruined unless he joined the uprising immediately. This letter was later used as evidence in Carnegy's 1716 treason trial at Carlisle to argue that his participation in the rebellion was a result of duress.

After the uprising, Lyon’s widow, Margaret Carnegie (Lady Auchterhouse), provided a sworn statement in August 1716 that shed light on the deep political rift between the two men. She described a "tenacious debate" at House of Finhaven just before the rebellion, where her brother, James Carnegy, had "argued very warmly for the Revolution and the power of parliament." According to Margaret, Lyon was so troubled by these views that he later remarked he "was sorry to see Finhaven of such principles." This testimony, combined with Lyon’s earlier letters threatening to burn Carnegie’s house and lands, proved critical in Carnegy’s 1716 treason trial, helping to establish that his eventual participation in the rebellion was a result of Lyon's coercion rather than political conviction."Deposition of Margaret Carnegie, Lady Auchterhouse". The National Archives, Kew. State Papers Domestic, George I (SP 35/6/47).

== Career and Political life ==
He represented the barons of Forfarshire in the last Parliament of Scotland, 1702 to 1707.

He was killed fighting on the Jacobite side at the Battle of Sheriffmuir, along side his nephew John Lyon 5th Earl of Strathmore.

Auchterhouse borrowed against his estates heavily over the course of ten or more years. His main creditors were the Ogilvies of Cortachy. At the time of his death at Sheriffmuir, his estates were lost to the Ogilvies in settlement of his vast debts.
