= James Carnegie =

James Carnegie may refer to:

- James Carnegie, 2nd Earl of Southesk (died 1669), Scottish nobleman
- James Carnegie (died 1700), Scottish MP for Forfarshire
- James Carnegie (died 1707), Scottish MP for Forfarshire
- James Carnegie (pirate) (fl. 1716), pirate active in the Caribbean who sailed with Henry Jennings
- James Carnegie, 5th Earl of Southesk (1692–1730), Scottish nobleman
- Sir James Carnegie, 3rd Baronet (1716–1765), Scottish MP for Kincardineshire
- Sir James Carnegie, 5th Baronet (1799–1849), Scottish MP for Aberdeen Burghs
- James Carnegie, 9th Earl of Southesk (1827–1905), his son, Lord Lieutenant of Kincardineshire
- James Carnegie, 3rd Duke of Fife (1929–2015), Scottish peer
