= James Carnegy of Finhaven =

- Laird of Finhaven
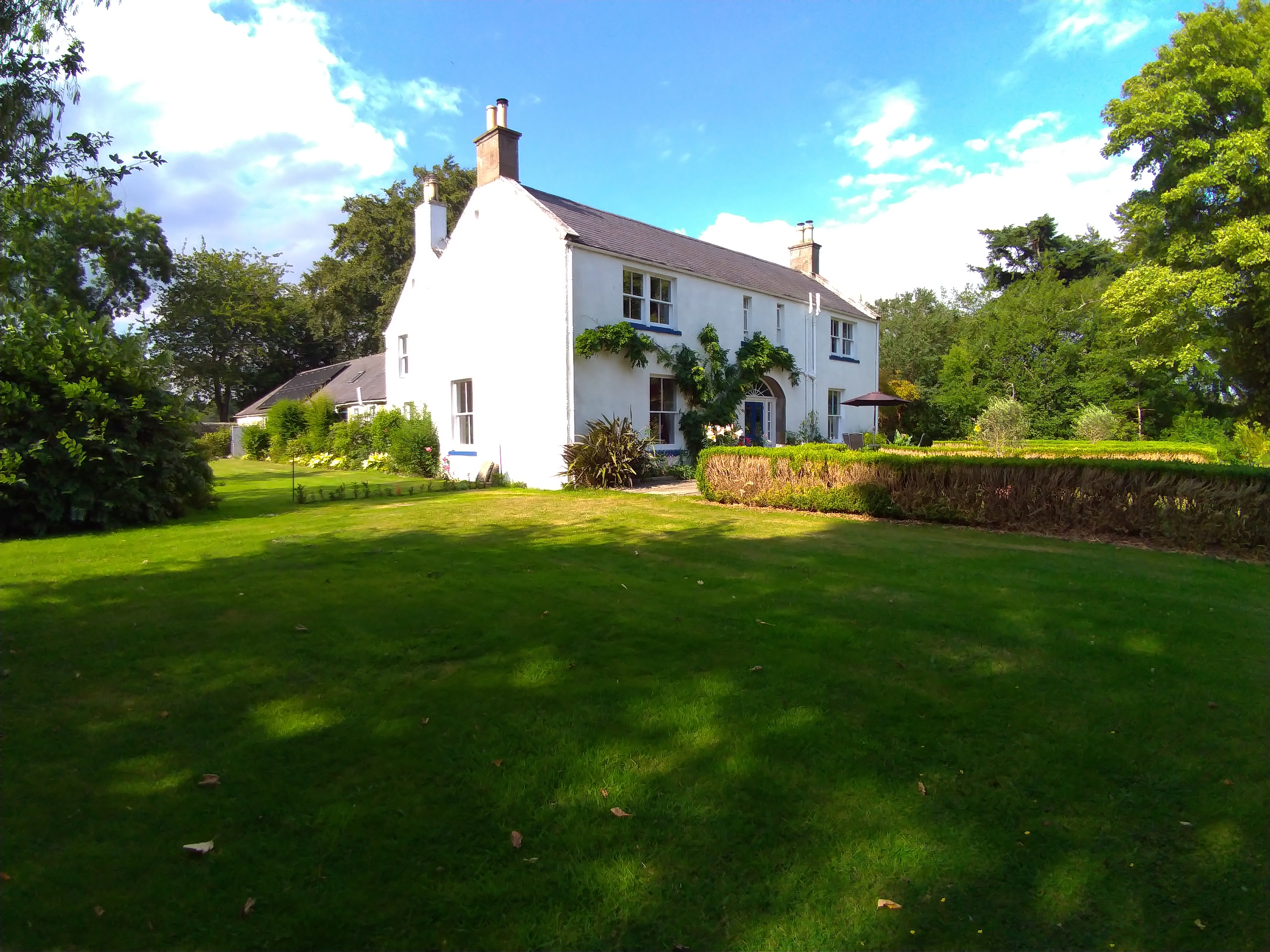
- The Milton of Finavon (the Mains), showing the early 18th-century Venacular Palladian wing.

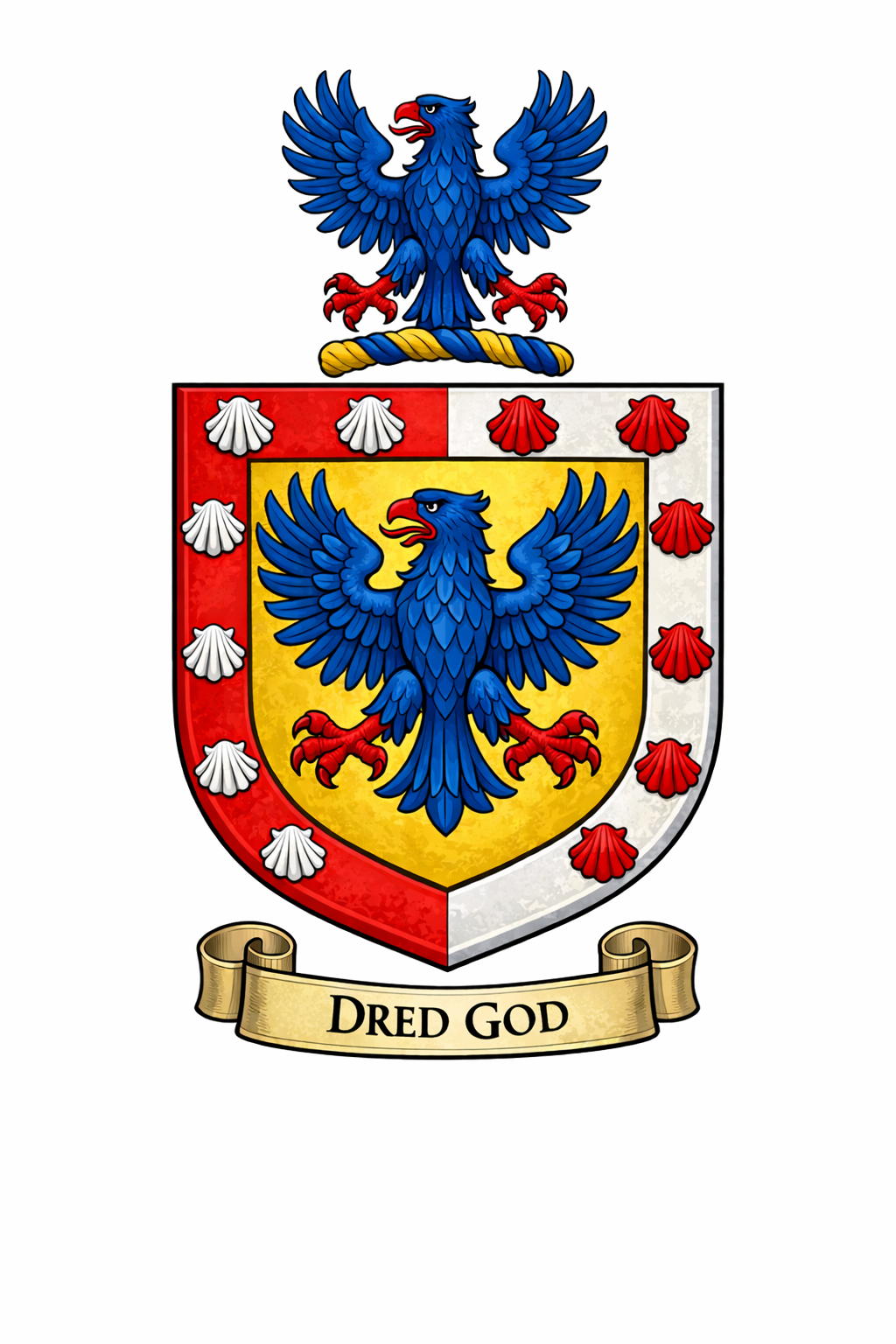
- Coat of arms: Or, an eagle displayed, azure, armed etc., sable; within a bordure parted per pale, gules and argent, charged with eight escallops countercharged. The Armorial Bearing: James Carnegy of Finhaven
- Tenure: 1710–1756
- Predecessor: Charles Carnegy
- Successor: James Carnegy (son)
- Born: 1685
- Died: 1756 (aged 70–71); Finhaven, Angus, Scotland
- Noble family: Carnegy
- Spouses: Margaret Bennet (m. 1709); Violet Naesmyth (m. 1740)
- Issue: Ann Carnegy; Margaret Carnegy; James Carnegy; Barbara Carnegy
- Parents: James Carnegie (died 1707) Anna Maitland d 1698 (Finhaven)

James Carnegy of Finhaven (also spelled Carnegie; b 1685 d 1756) was laird of the Finavon Estate, Angus, Scotland from 1712 until his death. He was to have inherited the estate by entail after the death of his father in 1707 Sir James Carnegy, even though his older brother Charles (who was severely disabled) was still alive. This was challenged in the Court of Session 29 July 1707. He then inherited the barony in 1710 after Charles d 1712 surrendered the estate in 1710. James was issued with the Barony in July 1710. In contemporary legal documents, including his 1716 statements at Carlisle, he frequently signed his name as "Ja: Carnegy".

== 1715 Jacobite Uprising ==
Contrary to accounts suggesting he was captured at the Battle of Sheriffmuir, Carnegy spent only eight days at the rebel camp at Perth as a prisoner of his Cousins, before escaping. He subsequently voluntarily surrendered to the Duke of Argyll at Aberdeen to prove his loyalty to the Crown. This was on the advice of his minister Rev John Anderson Oathlaw Kirk. Anderson made a full statement of his advice in his testament submission to the Carnegy trial at Carlisle in December 1716. He was initially held in Edinburgh, where he refused an opportunity to escape. He also declined to attend services led by non-juror ministers.

He was subsequently charged in Carlisle, where he provided evidence demonstrating that his involvement was coerced. Depositions from his household at the House of Finhaven confirmed he was pressured by his Jacobite cousins and brother-in-law, the James Carnegy, the 5th Earl of Southesk and Patrick Lyon of Auchterhouse, under direct threat of ruin and arson. His valet, Andrew Ferrier, testified that Carnegy had actively attempted to evade recruiters by hiding in his garden and also escaping through the back windows and private entries of his house. He was kidnapped by his cousins, with his groom: John Strachan. He then faked illness by "taking a vomit" (an emetic) at Coupar Angus to avoid being taken to Perth with the rebels: They took him anyway.

Testimony from Mary Mitchell, a servant to Carnegy’s sister Jean, Lady Kinfauns, testified of the political rift within the household during a gathering of the siblings and husbands at the House of Finhaven. Mitchell deposed that Carnegy’s brother-in-law, the Jacobite Patrick Lyon of Auchterhouse Castle, James's other sister Margaret's husband, "grew enraged" when Carnegy refused to toast the exiled James Stuart, asserting he would "drink no King's health but King George's." Lyon reportedly complained that Carnegy’s "head had been turned" by his other brother-in-law, the brother of his wife Margaret Bennet, the staunchly pro-government Sir William Bennet of Grubet (2nd Baronet), whose "Whiggish influence" was blamed for Carnegy’s refusal to support the Stuart cause. A portrait of Patrick Lyon of Auchterhouse hangs in the drawing room of Glamis Castle on the top far right corner.

== 1728 Trial ==
Finhaven accidentally killed Charles Lyon, 6th Earl of Strathmore and Kinghorne. He was represented by Robert Dundas of Arniston, the Elder which resulted in the not guilty verdict becoming a recognised part of Scots law and established the right of Scots juries to judge the whole case and not just the facts.

== Family ==
James Carnegy was the second son of James Carnegy of the old Finavon Castle (also known as Finhaven Tower Castle), and a grandson of David Carnegie, 2nd Earl of Northesk. The family seat, Finavon Castle Tower, is a scheduled monument

Carnegy married twice:

- First, around 1709, to **Margaret Bennet**, d 20 August 1738 daughter of Sir William Bennet of Grubbet. Letters to Sir William Bennett, dated 9 August 1709.Post Marriage Contract, dated 24 March 1711.

They had two daughters:

  - **Ann Carnegy** (died 1 December 1750), who married Sir John Ogilvy, 4th Baronet of Invercarity.
  - **Margaret Carnegy** (died 1815), who married firstly Foulis of Woodhall, and secondly Charles Lewis.
- Secondly, to **Violet Naesmyth**, M 17 February 1740 daughter of Sir James Naesmyth of Posso, Baronet. They had:
  - **James Carnegy** (1743–1777), the legal heir. He was formally recorded in the Service of Heirs on 12 May 1757. He later died unmarried in Lisbon.
  - **Barbara Carnegy**, who married Alexander Douglas.

== Estate and architecture ==
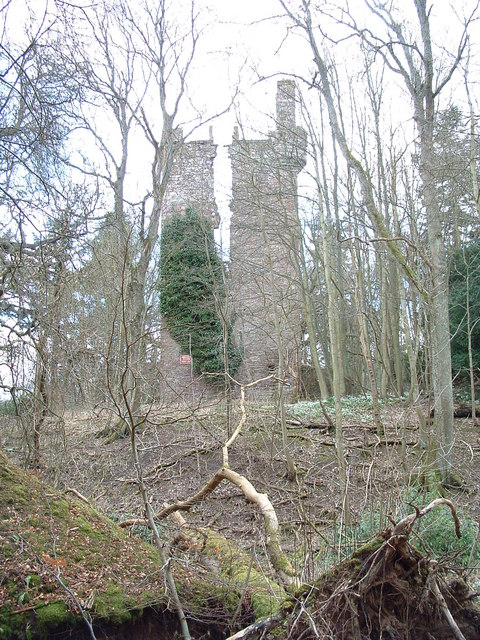
The ruins of Finhaven Castle, which James Carnegy transitioned from in 1712 due to structural instability.

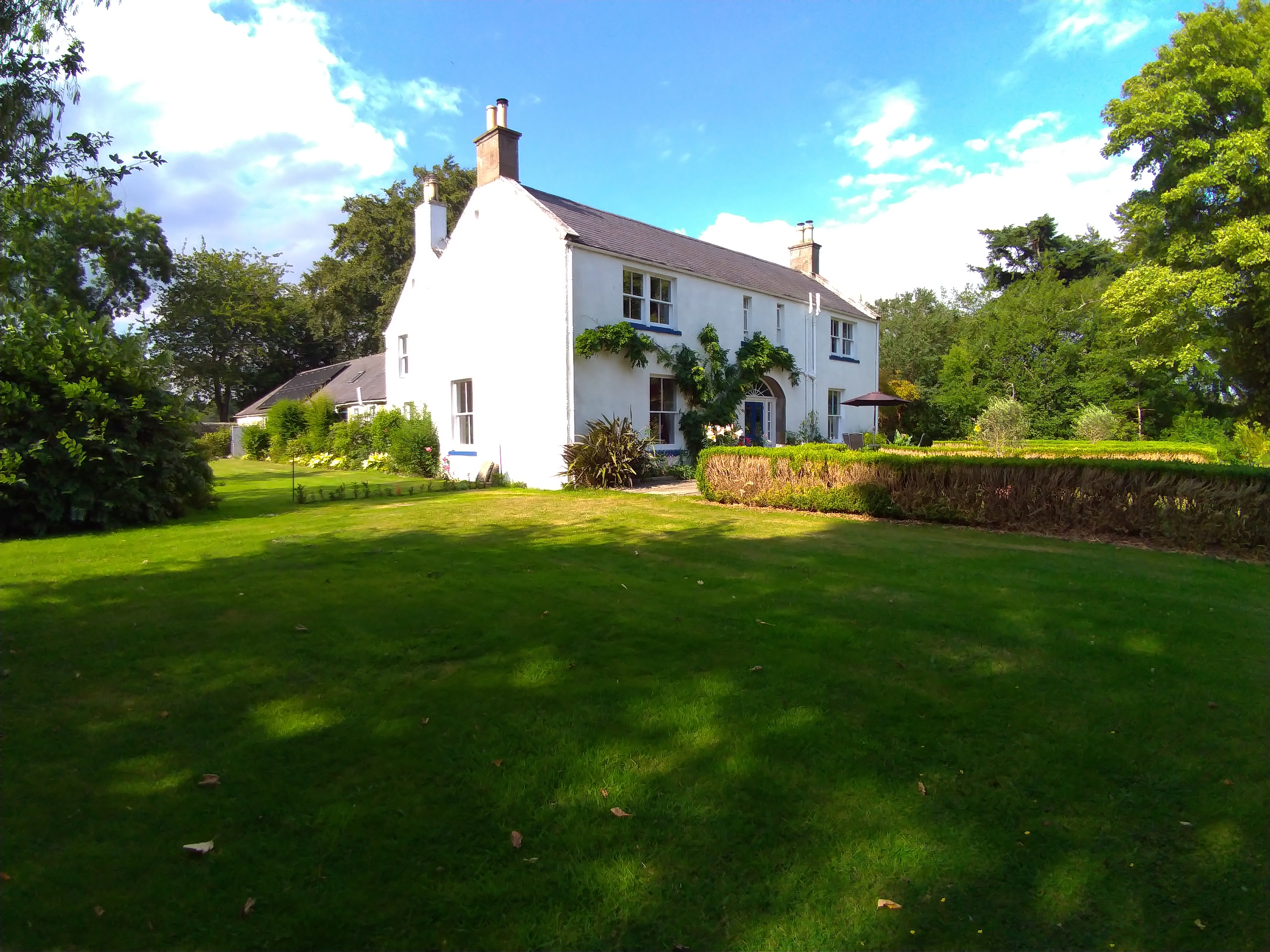
The Milton of Finavon (the Mains), showing the 18th-century three bay vernacular Palladian wing attributed to the William Adam circle.

Upon reaching his majority, Carnegy established his household as the second son at House of Finavon. This became his matrimonial home upon his marriage to Margaret Bennet around 1709. Their marriage contract, dated between 29 January and 4 March 1711, formally identified this "mannor place" as "the principal messuage" of the barony and secured it as Margaret's liferent in the event of Carnegy predeceasing her.

While Carnegy officially inherited the Barony of Finhaven in 1712, he had already transitioned the family's primary residence years earlier from the medieval Finavon Castle to the building then known as the Mains or Milton of Finhaven. This shift was necessitated by the structural instability of the old castle, which was described as being "rent through" and eventually suffered a catastrophic collapse in the mid-18th century.

The consistent identification of the residence as the "House of Finhaven" by contemporary witnesses—including his parish minister, Rev. Anderson, and household servants—confirms that the Milton of Finavon was the primary Carnegy seat during the rebellion.

Following his c1709 marriage to Margaret Bennet, Carnegy commissioned improvements to the House of Finhaven. The house was updated with a three bay facade and Palladian interiors, including a "sunrise" timber fanlight. While previously associated with Alexander McGill (architect), modern analysis of the family's patronage suggests the involvement of William Adam or his immediate circle. Margaret’s brother, Sir William Bennet of Grubet (2nd Baronet), was a key early patron of Adam, notably recommending him for the remodelling of Floors Castle during this period.This architectural link is further strengthened by Carnegy's close relationship with Robert Dundas of Arniston, the elder. Dundas, the legal counsel who successfully defended James Carnegy in his 1728 murder trial, had commissioned William Adam just two years earlier in 1726 to design Arniston House, highlighting the intimate circle of patronage shared by the two men.

During the restoration of Milton of Finavon House (2021–2025), architectural discoveries include a solar alignment of the house to the winter solstice and the presence of rare circa 1730 rag paper within the inner hall, which remains on display as primary evidence of the period's decorative and intellectual trends. Further evidence of the high value of James' restoration is the Crown glass in the timber fanlight, which is still in existence today

== Inheritance and family ==
James’s succession to the estate followed the death of his elder brother, Charles Carnegy, in May 1712. Charles's testament confirms he died unmarried, appointing their sister, Margaret Carnegy, Lady Auchterhouse, as his sole executrix.

The family arms were recorded as: Or, an eagle displayed, azure, armed etc., sable; within a bordure parted per pale, gules and argent, charged with eight escallops countercharged.

== Wills and testaments ==
Sir James Carnegy (father) created an entail in 1703 making James his second son heir, as Charles his eldest brother had suffered a "palsy" making him unable to walk and talk with any clarity. After their father's death in 1707, Charles immediately challenged the entail. The case was heard in the Court of Session Edinburgh. James agreed to allow his older brother to hold the barony title for his lifetime. The Court agreed.

James Carnegy died 1756.

The testament of his son James Carnegy d 1777 Lisbon, was held in London. His sister Barbara Douglas (née Carnegy) was his sole heir.

== Death of the Earl of Strathmore ==
On 9 May 1728, Patrick Carnegy of Lour, residing in the burgh of Forfar, was burying his daughter. According to Robert Chambers's - Domestic Annals of Scotland: "Before the funeral, he entertained the Earl of Strathmore, his brother James Carnegy of Finhaven, John Lyon of Bridgeton, and some others, at dinner in his house." He then writes: "after the funeral, the men adjourned to the tavern of Clerk Dickinson in Forfar and continued drinking." Chambers goes on to note: "Carnegy of Finhaven reportedly became extremely drunk. Lyon of Bridgeton was said to have been less intoxicated, but the drink made him 'rude and unmannerly' towards Finhaven. Afterwards, the Earl of Strathmore went to call at the house of Finhaven's sister, Lady Margaret Auchterhouse (The aunt-in-law of the Earl), and the others followed." Chambers goes on to describe the domestic scene: "Despite being in the presence of a lady and widow of high status, Bridgeton used 'coarse language' and 'may have pinched Auchterhouse's arm'. Bridgeton also directed gendered insults toward Finhaven, aired grievances about his perceived misconduct in a dispute involving Bridgeton's cousin, and made impolite comments about Finhaven's supposed debts."

In other reports, the story continued: "Eventually, Strathmore convinced Bridgeton and Finhaven to leave the house with him. About dusk, the party went out into the street, and now that the modified restraint of a lady's presence was removed, Bridgeton pushed Finhaven into a 'deep and dirty kennel' (ditch) which ran along the roadside. Finhaven, still inebriated and now covered in mud and mire, became enraged. The mores of the time sanctioned violent retribution to settle disputes of honour. Finhaven therefore drew his sword and lunged at Bridgeton. To divert the attack, the Earl placed himself between the two opponents, causing Finhaven to strike him inadvertently. The blade of the sword punctured Strathmore's abdomen and exited through his lower back. He died forty-nine hours after the incident."

== Public outcry ==
The public outcry to the intended prosecution of Carnegy of Finhaven is illustrated in "A Letter from a Gentleman in Forfar, to his Friend at Edinburgh."

SIR, Forfar, May 16th, 1728.

ACCORDING to your Desire, I have sent you an Account of the lamentable Catastrophe, which happen'd on Thursday the 9th of May instant, which has filled all the Kingdom with an universal Regret ; and this Part of it with the utmost Grief and Confusion imaginable, which is to be seen in the Faces young and old, all over the Country ; the Fact is as follows,

On Thursday being the 9th Instant, several of the neighbouring Gentlemen were invited to this Place to a Burial, and among the rest the Earl of Strathmore, Carnegy of Finhaven, and Mr. Lyon of Brigton; after the Burial was over, a great many of the Gentlemen; among whom were these three before mentioned, went to a Tavern, where after they had been there some Time, Finhaven and Brigton fell a quarrelling, as some say, concerning the Lady Kinfawns, whose Brother Finhaven is; and others say it was about the Marriage of a Daughter of Finhaven's to a young Gentleman in this Country ; but however that be, Finhaven went to take his Horse, and had one foot in the Stirup, as his Servants say, when Brigton attack'd him, and threw him in a Mire, where he had certainly perish'd, had not his Servants come to his Rescue, together with the deceast Earl; Finhaven was no sooner recover'd, and his Servants endeavouring to make clean his Cloaths, but he drew his Sword; and the Earl stepping in to prevent any Mischief that might happen, received from Finhaven a mortal Wound, about an Inch below his Navel, which wounded his Puddings in three Parts, and went quite throrow his Body. His Lordship, after he received the Wound, spoke little till Saturday's Night he called for his Lady, endeavouring to comfort her, and grasping her Hand, he died about 12 a Clock that Night. This is the unfortunate End of this universally beloved Nobleman, whose rare Qualities render'd him an Ornament to his Country, a Pattern of Youth, and the Admiration of all that knew him.

I am Yours, & c.

== The trial for murder ==
Carnegy was tried on 2 August 1728 for premeditated murder, a charge supported by "long arguments and quotations of authority," as was common at that time. The accused swore that he had no grudge against the Earl, but instead he had had the greatest kindness and respect for him. "If it shall appear," he had said, "that I was the unlucky person who wounded the earl, I protest before God I would much rather that a sword had been sheathed in my own bowels." He did not admit his guilt except to say: "I had the misfortune that day to be mortally drunk, for which I beg God’s pardon." Carnegy said that in this state he did not remember seeing the Earl when he came out of the ditch.

His defence counsel argued that in the circumstances of the case he was guilty not of murder, but of manslaughter. However, the court, "sacrificing rationality to form and statute," overruled the defence on the basis that the prisoner had "given the wound whereof the Earl of Strathmore died."

Robert Chambers writes "The killing being indisputable, Carnegy would have been condemned if the jury had merely given a verdict on the point of fact. In these circumstances, his counsel, Robert Dundas of Arniston, told the jury that they were entitled to judge on 'the point of law' as well as the 'point of fact'. He asserted that they should only decide whether in their conscience Carnegy had committed murder, or whether his guilt was not diminished or annihilated by the circumstances of the case. Quite unexpectedly the jury did not give a verdict of either 'proven' or 'not proven' but instead gave a verdict of 'not guilty', thus establishing the constitutional principle of a Scottish jury's right to render one of three verdicts: "proven", "not proven" and the now resurrected "not guilty" which remained contentious until the "not proven" verdict stopped being used in January 2026.

== Legacy and Edinburgh residency ==
Following Carnegy's death, his descendants maintained the family's presence across both Forfarshire and the capital. By 1775, the family had relocated their established winter presence in Edinburgh to the newly developed New Town; Carnegie's son, James Carnegie (died 1777), is recorded in Williamson's Directory as a resident of Princes Street near his kinsman, George Carnegie, 6th Earl of Northesk. This residence was situated in the initial phase of the New Town development designed by James Craig (architect) and John Adam (architect). The Carnegy family maintained a multi-generational connection with the Adam architectural dynasty, as William Adam's circle had previously modernised the façade of the country seat, the House of Finhaven.
