= Church of St. John the Baptist (Mlázovy) =

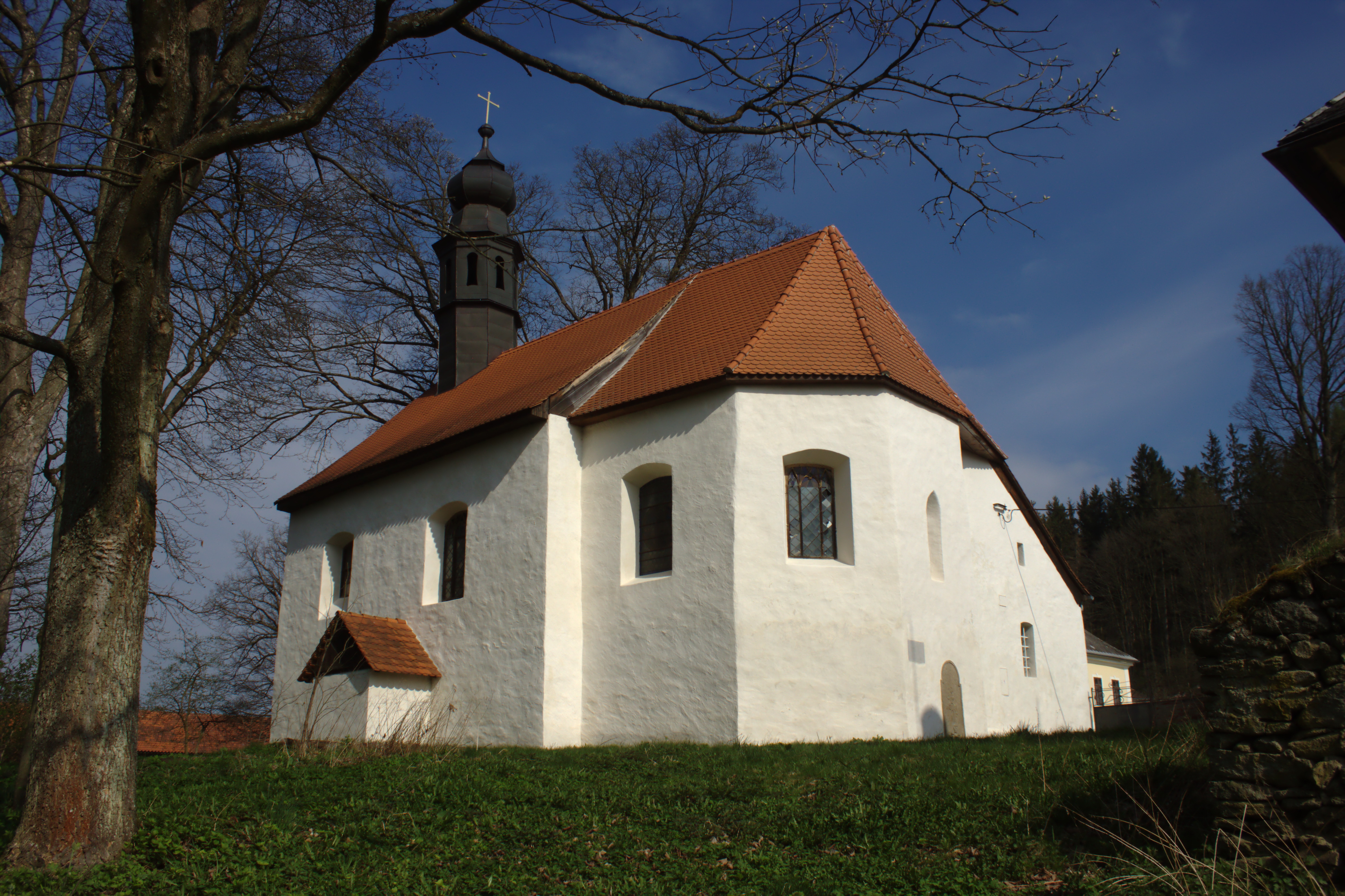
- Church of St. John the Baptist
- 49.313685°N 13.405762°E
- Location: Mlázovy
- Country: Czech Republic
- Denomination: Roman Catholic Church

Architecture
- Functional status: Active

Administration
- Province: Czech ecclesiastical province
- Archdiocese: Roman Catholic Archdiocese of České Budějovice
- Parish: Roman Catholic Parish of Mlázovy

The Church of St. John the Baptist (Czech: Kostel svatého Jana Křtitele) is located in the village of Mlázovy, near the chateau complex. It is an early Gothic building that was later modified in the Baroque style.

The church is situated at the southwestern edge of the village, directly adjacent to the Mlázovy chateau and park. The first written mention of the village and the church dates back to 1361.

== History ==
The first written reports about the Mlázovy estate come from the first third of the 16th century. These are records of Jan Mlázovský from Těšnice and Petr Mlázovský from Těšnice na Mlázovech. The family of Jindřich Tomek from Čejkov stayed here until 1694. After that fortified residence with manor farm, brewery, hop fields, gardens and orchards was bought by Jan Václav Příchovský from Příchovice. Since 1689, Mlázovy has been under the parish of Kolinec. In 1712, the Gothic fortress with the manor farm became the property of Jan Vilém Bernklau from Schönreuth, who built a new Baroque chateau on its site in 1721. The entire estate passed to his daughter Barbora Kateřina, who married Berg. In May 1773, the next owner of the chateau, Jan Josef Bořek Dohalský from Dohalice, established a chateau chaplaincy and managed it until 1788. After that the owners changed more frequently.

== Building Phases ==
The Church in the village of Mlázovy was probably built in the first half of the 14th century (dated between 1310 and 1340). During this period, the chancel with a vault, triumphal arch, the portal masonry of the nave, the window on the eastern side of the chancel, and probably the western gable of the nave were built. Later, a sacristy was constructed, which was subsequently modified by demolishing the western wall of the sacristy to create space for the installation of stairs leading to the oratory. In the 18th century, significant modifications were made to the church, including the alteration of the windows in the nave and chancel, the western wall was perforated to create a new entrance to the nave (later walled up), the gallery with stairs was built, a new northern entrance was created, a new window was made in the eastern wall, and the sacristy was vaulted. At the beginning of the 20th century, the interior was painted, the northern portal's cornice was modified, and presumably, an annex was built on the south wall of the nave. In 2003–2004, the roof trusses were repaired, and new roofing material was installed.

== Description ==
Until the 20th century, the church served as a chapel for the nearby castle. Its main nave is polygonally closed by a five-sided chancel (presbytery) and equipped with a sacristy and an oratory on the upper floor. The presbytery with radial ribbed vaulting is smoothly concluded in the middle by a keystone and is pierced by four windows, of which only one with a 15 cm opening is original. The church roof is topped by a bulbous dome with a bell tower. The entrance on the north side of the church is formed by a pointed arch with a shallow profile. The main nave of the church, with a flat ceiling, is 8.30 m long and 7.60 m wide. Its interior is adorned with three Baroque altars with sculptural decoration. The original baptismal font and a 14th-century Madonna with child have been preserved. A Romanesque chapel is located in the perimeter wall of the church cemetery to the east.

== Architectural style ==
The Church of St. John the Baptist in Mlázovy is an oriented single-nave building with a five-sided closed presbytery without buttresses, with a square sacristy on the north side and an oratory on the upper floor, without a tower. The church nave has a wider rectangular floor plan, while the presbytery is narrower and rectangular. The church nave has a flat ceiling with a stucco mirror. The presbytery is vaulted with radial ribs with a wedge profile. The choir loft is not vaulted. The interior of the presbytery is illuminated by five windows, one of which is Gothic, tall, and narrow. The nave and presbytery are covered by a gable roof, sloping into a polygonal barrel at the end, and the sacristy has a shed roof. On the western side, there is a tin-plated octagonal turret, the so-called "sanctus bell".
