= Thomas Gardyne =

Scottish laird (1780–1841)

Thomas Gardyne of Middleton and Finavon (1780–1841) was a Scottish laird and founder of the village of Friockheim in Angus, Scotland.

== Family ==
He was the third son of James Gardyne of Lawton and Middleton and Mary Wallace, daughter of Thomas Wallace a merchant, ship-owner and Provost of Arbroath.

== Friockheim ==
A flax miller called Jon Anderson approached Gardyne about building a village around his flax mill, which stood on Gardyne's land, to house workers for the mill. Gardyne agreed and in 1814 they advertised the new village of Friockheim, letting the houses on good terms to workers in the mill. The village was built by the Lunan Water, north-east of Middleton and Gardyne Castle on farmland around the original Friock Feus. At its peak it had a population of approximately 1,200, although this has dropped to around 800 today.

== Death ==
Gardyne died unmarried in 1841 and was succeeded as laird of Middleton by his nephew, Major William Bruce-Gardyne, while Finavon Castle passed to another nephew, James Carnegy. Bruce-Gardyne sold much of the village, although the family remain large landowners in the district.
