= Sir William Bennet of Grubet (2nd Baronet) =

Scottish politician and patron (1666–1729)

Sir William Bennet
- 2nd Baronet of Grubet

2nd Baronet of Grubet
- Predecessor: Sir William Bennet, 1st Baronet
- Successor: Sir William Bennet, 3rd Baronet
- Born: 1666
- Died: December 23, 1729 (aged 62–63)
- Spouses: Jean Kerr; Margaret Scougall (m. 1692); Elizabeth Hay (m. 1695)
- Occupation: Member of Parliament, Muster Master General

Sir William Bennet, 2nd Baronet (1666 – 23 December 1729), of Grubet (also spelled Grubbet), was a Scottish politician, a military officer, and a patron of the arts. He represented Roxburghshire in the Parliament of Scotland from 1693 until 1707 and served in the 1st Parliament of Great Britain following the Union of 1707.

== Biography ==
Born in 1666, he was the eldest son of Sir William Bennet, 1st Baronet. He was educated at the University of Edinburgh, graduating in 1685.

His sister, Margaret Bennet, was married to James Carnegie of Finhaven of Angus, Scotland. Their marriage contract was signed on 24 March 1711.

=== Political and military career ===
Bennet was a committed supporter of the Glorious Revolution and accompanied the Prince of Orange from Holland. In 1704, he was appointed Muster Master General for Scotland, a post he held until 1708. During the Jacobite rising of 1715, he led the Roxburghshire militia in the defence of Kelso.

=== Political Life ===
Bennet was a prominent Whigg and supporter of the Hanoverian succession and was famously accused by his brother-in-law's (James Carnegy) Jacobite relatives of "turning his head". During the Jacobite rising of 1715, Bennet's pro-government influence was blamed for Carnegie's refusal to support the Stuart claimant. This political rift was documented at a family gathering at the House of Finhaven by Mary Mitchell, a servant to Carnegie's sister Jean (Lady Kinfauns). Mitchell deposed that Patrick Lyon of Auchterhouse grew enraged at the summit, explicitly identifying Bennet as the source of Carnegie's "Whiggish" principles and his refusal to join the rebel cause."Deposition of Mary Mitchell, servant to Jean Carnegy". State Papers Domestic, George I (SP 35/6/47, Item 14). "Mitchell states that Lyon of Auchterhouse complained Carnegie 'had his head turned by his brother-in-law William Bennet' and refused to toast the Pretender."

=== Patronage ===
Bennet was a noted patron of literature and a friend to poets including James Thomson and Allan Ramsay.
