= Home Farm =

Home Farm may refer to:

== Farms ==
- Home farm (agriculture), a part of a large country estate that is farmed by the landowner or an employed farm manager
- Home Farm, Brodick, the estate farm for Brodick Castle, in Scotland
- Home Farm (East Whitehall, New York), historic farm
- Home Farm (Leesburg, Virginia), Virginia Historic Landmark and farm, and U.S. National Register of Historic Places
- Home Farm, Old Dalby, Grade II listed building in Leicestershire
- Duchy Home Farm, an organic farm within the grounds of Highgrove House, England
- Home Farm, fictional farm and business in the UK soap opera Emmerdale
- Home Farm, fictional farm in the UK radio soap opera The Archers

== Football ==
- Home Farm Everton, name of Home Farm F.C. between 1995 and 1999
- Home Farm F.C., Irish football club
- Home Farm Fingal, name of Dublin City F.C. before 2001
- Home Farm, former home ground of Queens Park Rangers F.C.

== Other uses ==
- Home Farm, Bracknell, a suburb in Berkshire, England
- Home Farm (Woodland Trust), a Woodland Trust area between Burkham and Bentworth, Hampshire
- Home Farm, a development near Caerleon, southern Wales

== See also ==
- Manor Farm (disambiguation), a similar sort of farm established during the centuries of manorialism
