= Forfarshire (disambiguation) =

Forfarshire was the historic name for Angus, Scotland.

Forfarshire may also refer to:

- Forfarshire (Parliament of Scotland constituency), a pre-1707 constituency
- Forfarshire (ship), a paddle steamer built in 1834 and wrecked in 1838
- Forfarshire (UK Parliament constituency), 1708–1950
