= Finavon Castle (19th-century mansion) =

19th-century country house in Angus, Scotland

- 19th-century Mansion
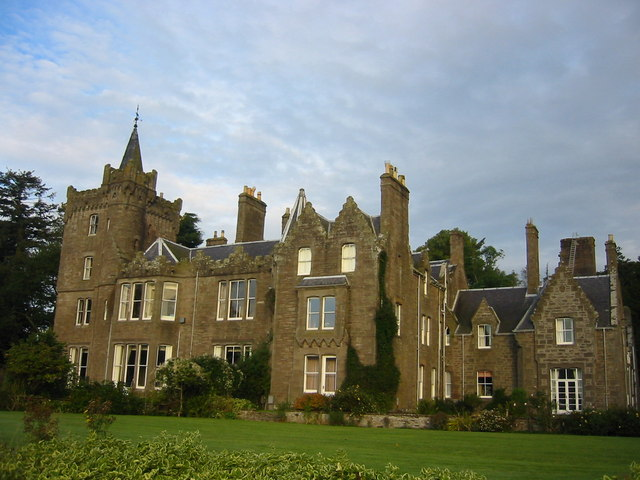
- The Victorian Baronial Mansion House (1865)
- Interactive map of Finavon Castle
- Type: Country house
- Location: Finavon, Angus
- Coordinates: 56.69733°N 2.82390°W
- Built: 1865
- Architect: Messrs Carver and Symon
- Architectural style: Scottish Baronial
- Owner: Alan David Greenhill Gardyne (historically)

Listed Building – Category C(S)
- Official name: FINAVON CASTLE
- Designated: 15 January 1980
- Reference no.: Listed Building LB17722

Finavon Castle is a 19th-century Scottish baronial style mansion in Angus, Scotland. Located 130m west of the ruins of the 17th-century tower house, it was built in 1865 to serve as the principal residence of the Finavon estate.

== History ==
The mansion was commissioned by Alan David Greenhill Gardyne Lt.-Col. Alan David Greenhill Gardyne (1868–1953) was a Gordon Highlanders officer and the laird of Finavon Castle. He served as a Justice of the Peace and inherited the estate through his descent from the old Lindsay stock.

Commissioned and designed by the Arbroath firm of Messrs Carver and Symon. It replaced the nearby medieval castle which had been ruinous since the 18th century.

The Gardyne family occupied the house until the early 1980s. In 1984, the building was converted into eight luxury apartments.

== Architecture ==
The house is a three-storey Baronial mansion with a four-storey corner tower. While it originally had a large servants' wing at the rear, part of this was demolished in 1970.
