= Mlázovy =

- Village
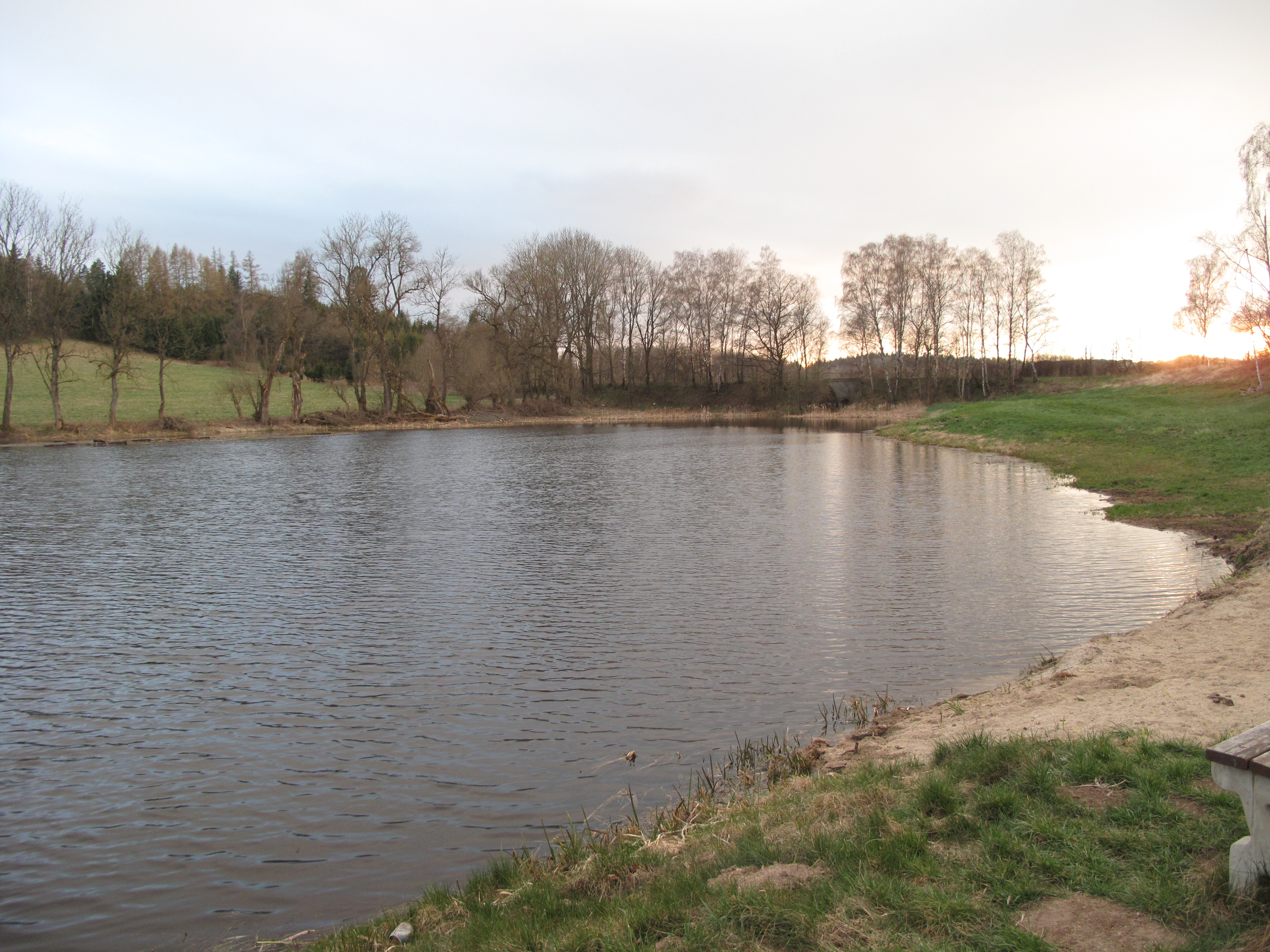
- Malý u Mlázov pond

- Location in the Czech Republic
- Coordinates: 49°18′51″N 13°24′25″E
- Country: Czech Republic
- Region: Plzeň
- District: Klatovy
- Municipality: Kolinec
- First mentioned: 1360

Area
  - Total: 3.46 km^{2} (1.34 sq mi)

Population (2021)
  - Total: 87
  - Density: 25/km^{2} (65/sq mi)
- Time zone: UTC+1 (CET)
  - Summer (DST): UTC+2 (CEST)
- Postal code: 341 42

Mlázovy is a village and administrative part of Kolinec in Klatovy District in the Plzeň Region of the Czech Republic. It has about 90 inhabitants.

== Geography ==
The Boříkovský Brook flows through the area. The ponds Malý u Mlázov and Váchovec are supplied by the brook. Malý u Mlázov was captured on the map from 1783.

== History ==
The first written mention of Mlázovy is from 1360.

== Sights ==
- Church of St. John the Baptist
- Mlázovy Castle
- Cemetery chapel
- Column with a statue of St. John of Nepomuk
