= John Gardyne of Lawton and Middleton =

Scottish laird (d. 1704)

John Gardyne of Lawton and Middleton (died after 1704) was a Scottish laird. He served in the Convention of the Estates of Scotland as shire commissioner for the county of Angus in 1667.

He was the son of David Gardyne, 10th Laird of Gardyne and last Gardyne of that Ilk, and his wife Janet Lindsay, daughter of Sir David Lindsay, Lord Edzell, a judge and the son of David Lindsay, 9th Earl of Crawford. John Gardyne of Middleton was married to Elizabeth Arbuthnott and they had issue reputedly, 3 sons and 18 daughters.
