= Home Farm (Leesburg, Virginia) =

Historic house in Virginia, United States

- U.S. National Register of Historic Places
- Virginia Landmarks Register
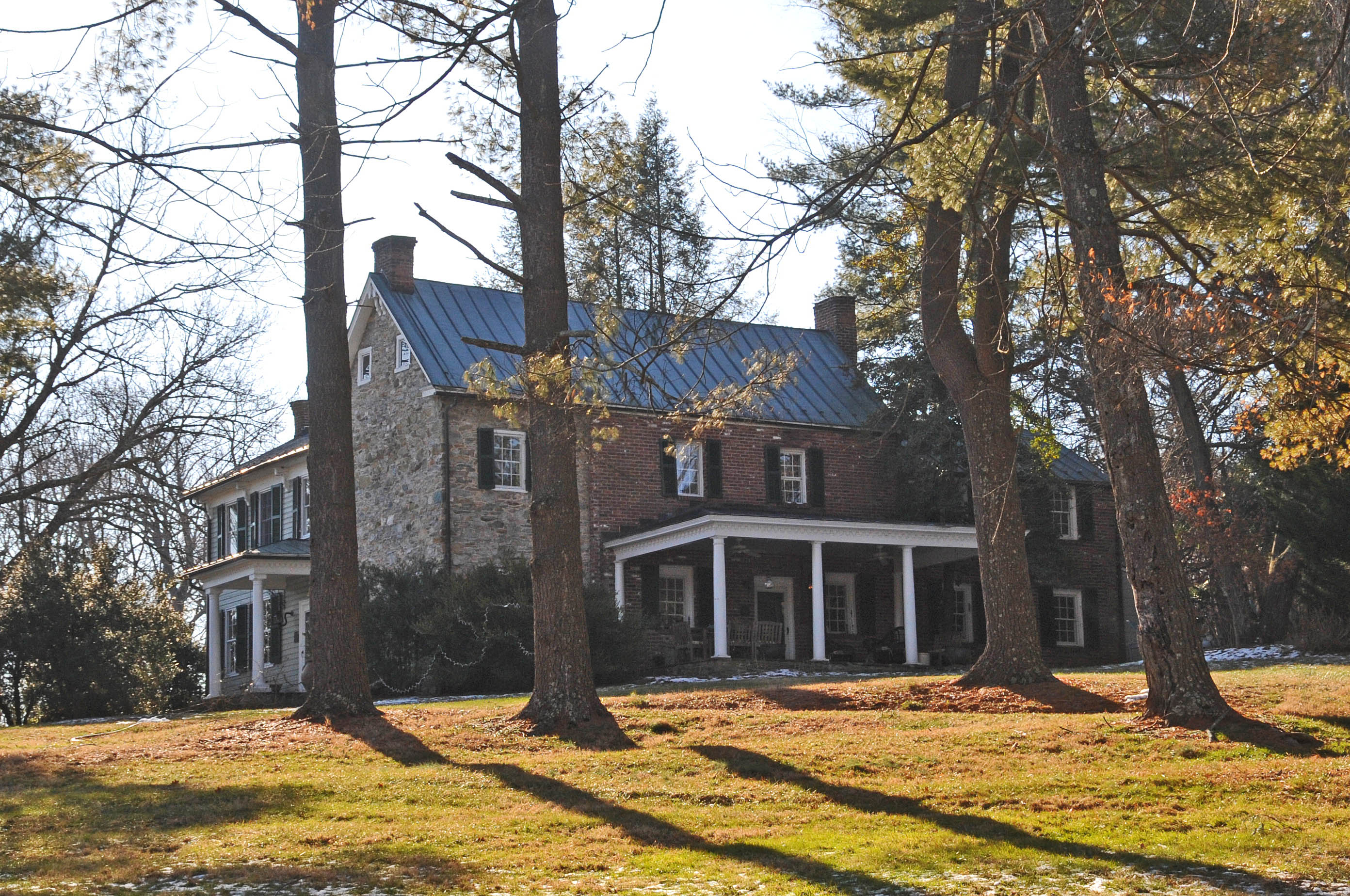

- Location within Northern Virginia Location within Virginia Location within the United States
- Location: 40332 Mount Gilead, near Leesburg, Virginia
- Coordinates: 39°4′37″N 77°36′29″W
- Area: 8.7 acres (3.5 ha)
- Built: c. 1757, c. 1810, c. 1830, c. 1930
- Architectural style: Colonial, Federal
- NRHP reference No.: 07000828
- VLR No.: 053-5388

Significant dates
- Added to NRHP: August 10, 2007
- Designated VLR: September 6, 2006

Home Farm is a historic home located near Leesburg, Loudoun County, Virginia. The original log section of the house was built about 1757, with a stone addition built about 1810, a frame addition built about 1830, and a frame kitchen addition built about 1930. It is an L-shaped, two-story, single-pile vernacular house clad in wood siding, random rubble fieldstone, and brick veneer laid. The interior exhibits stylistic influences of the Federal style. Also on the property are a contributing early-20th century henhouse, the stone foundation of a spring house, and a dry-laid fieldstone wall.

It was listed on the National Register of Historic Places in 2007.

In 2019, Home Farm 1760 was established at "Home Farm" specializing in organic locally sourced produce, botanicals, and products.
