= James Carnegie (died 1700) =

Scottish politician

- Died: 25 April 1700
- Occupation: Commissioner for Parliament of Scotland
- Spouse(s): Margaret Carnegie, Jean Fotheringham

James Carnegie of Balnamoon (died 25 April 1700) was a member of the Parliament of Scotland.

He was the son of Sir John Carnegie of Balnamoon, and was served heir male to his uncle David Carnegie on 4 November 1662. He served as commissioner for the shire of Forfar in Parliament from 1669 to 1674, from 1681 to 1682 and from 1685 to 1686.

Carnegie of Balnamoon married firstly Margaret, daughter of Sir Alexander Carnegie of Pitarrow, and secondly Jean, widow of John Carnegie of Boysack and daughter of David Fotheringham of Powrie. Jean survived him, dying in November 1705.
