= Bennet baronets =

Extinct baronetcy in the Baronetage of England

There have been four baronetcies created for persons with the surname Bennet, two in the Baronetage of England and two in the Baronetage of Nova Scotia. All four creations are extinct.

The Bennet Baronetcy, (also variously “Bennett” of Beachampton in the County of Buckingham, was created in the Baronetage of England on 17 July 1627 for Simon Bennet. The title became extinct on his death in 1631. Sir Thomas Bennett (died 1627), father of the first Baronet, was Lord Mayor of London from 1603 to 1604.

The Bennet Baronetcy, of Babraham in the County of Cambridge, was created in the Baronetage of England on 22 November 1660 for Thomas Bennet. The second Baronet sat as member of parliament for Cambridgeshire. The title became extinct on the death of the third Baronet in 1701.

The Bennet Baronetcy, (also contemporaneously recorded as “Bennett”) of Grubet (also contemporaneously recorded as “Grubbet”) in the County of Roxburgh, was created in the Baronetage of Nova Scotia on 18 November 1670 for William Bennet(t). The second Baronet was one of the Scottish representatives to the first Parliament of Great Britain. The baronetcy became extinct on the death of the fifth Baronet circa 1765 but the Scottish Barony of Grubbet remains within the Bennett family.

The Bennet Baronetcy, of Fife, was created in the Baronetage of Nova Scotia on 28 July 1671 for George Bennet. The title became extinct on his death circa 1700.

== Bennet baronets, of Beachampton (1627) ==
- Sir Simon Bennett, 1st Baronet (c. 1584 – 21 Aug 1631) Lord de Calverton, Lord de Beachampton

== Bennet baronets, of Babraham (1660) ==
- Sir Thomas Bennet, 1st Baronet (c. 1597–1667)
- Sir Levinus Bennet, 2nd Baronet (1631–1693)
- Sir Richard Bennet, 3rd Baronet (1673–1701)

== Bennet baronets, of Grubet (1670) ==
- Sir William Bennet, 1st Baronet (died 1710) Dau Margaret married James Carnegie of Finhaven 29 January 1711.
- Sir William Bennet, 2nd Baronet (died 1729)
- Sir William Bennet, 3rd Baronet (died 1733)
- Sir David Bennet, 4th Baronet (died 1741)
- Sir John Bennet, 5th Baronet (c. 1765)

== Bennet baronets, of Fife (1671) ==
- Sir George Bennet, 1st Baronet (died c. 1700)

== See also ==
- Bennett baronets
