= Manor Farm =

Manor Farm is the name traditionally given to the farm of a manor house in England. Its produce was used to supply the manor. Due to its ancient origins, there are many uses of the name Manor Farm:

- Manor Farm Country Park and its museum, in Botley, Hampshire
- Manor Farm, Pulham Market, Norfolk, a property owned by the Landmark Trust
- Manor Farm, Ruislip, London
- Manor Farm, Surrey, a nature reserve owned by the Surrey Wildlife Trust
- Manor Farm, West Challow, Oxfordshire

Literature

- Manor Farm is the setting of George Orwell's novel Animal Farm

See also

- Home Farm (disambiguation), a similar sort of farm established after the end of manorialism
