= Home Farm, Old Dalby =

Farmhouse in Leicestershire, England

Home Farm
- Home Farmhouse
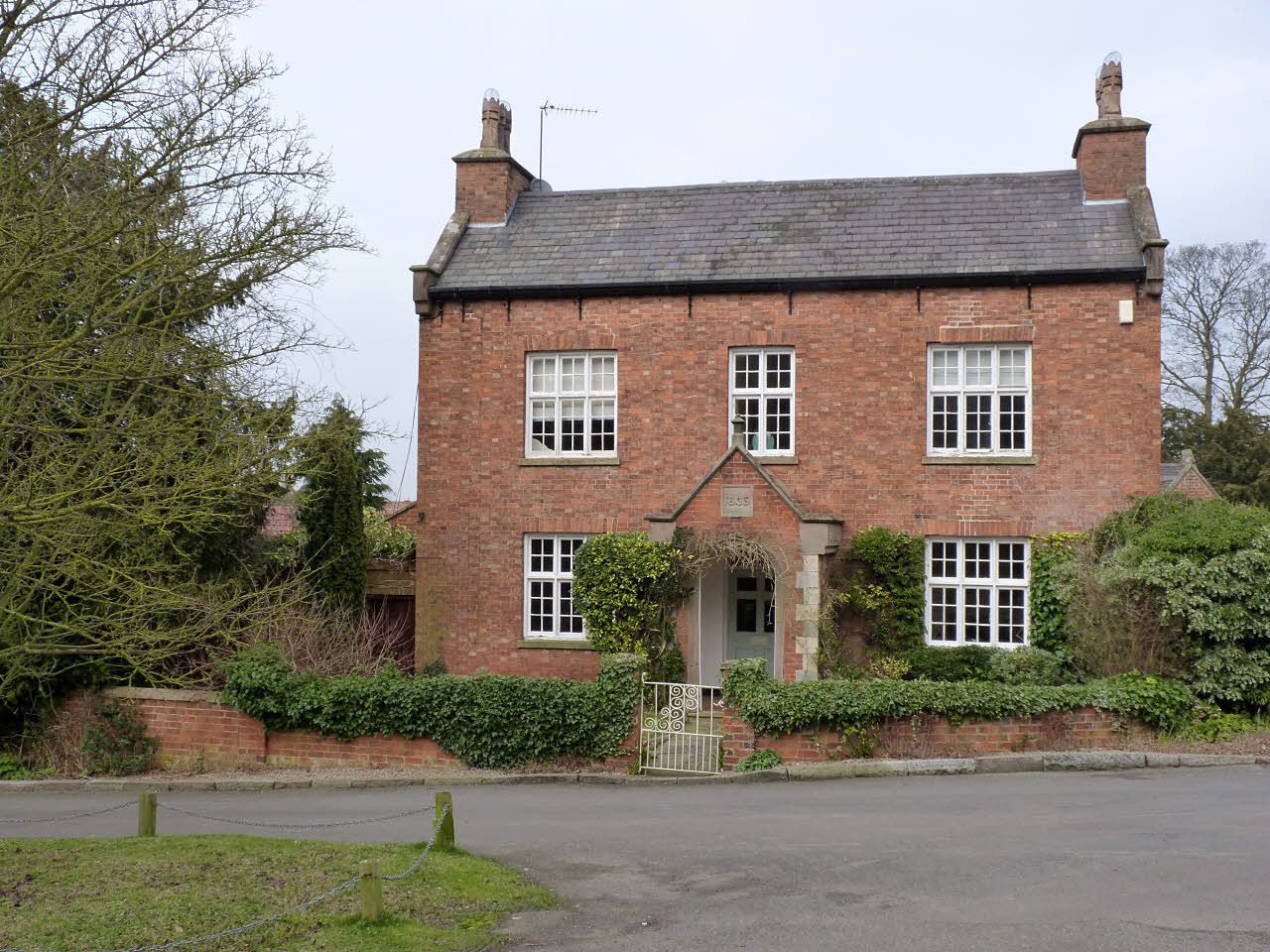
- Home Farm in 2014

- Location within Leicestershire
- 52.805521°N 1.001907°W
- Location: Church Lane, Old Dalby, Leicestershire, England

History
- Built: 1835; 191 years ago

Site notes
- Area: Borough of Melton

Listed Building – Grade II
- Designated: 3 August 1979
- Reference no.: 1360886

Home Farm is an historic farmhouse in Old Dalby, Leicestershire, England. It was built in 1635 and is a Grade II listed building. Dating to the Georgian period, it was substantially enlarged in 1835, when it became home farm to the nearby Old Hall.

The building stands directly opposite the church of St John the Baptist, a Grade II* listed building.
