= Forfarshire (Parliament of Scotland constituency) =

Constituency of the Parliament of Scotland

Before the Act of Union 1707, the barons of the shire of Forfar (now called Angus) elected commissioners to represent them in the unicameral Parliament of Scotland and in the Convention of Estates. The number of commissioners was increased from two to four in 1693.

After 1708, Forfarshire returned one member to the House of Commons of Great Britain and later to the House of Commons of the United Kingdom.

== List of shire commissioners ==
- 1600: David Carnegie of Kinnaird
- 1605 (convention): David Carnegie of Kinnaird
- 1605: Sir James Scrymgeour of Dudhope
- 1609 (convention): David Carnegie of Kinnaird
- 1612: Collace of Balnamoon
- 1612: Sir John Scrymgeour of Dudhope
- 1617 (convention and parliament): Haliburton of Pitcur
- 1617: Sir John Scrymgeour of Dudhope
- 1621: Fothringham of Powrie-Fothringham
- 1621: Sir John Scrymgeour of Dudhope
- 1628-1633: Sir William Graham of Claverhouse
- 1628-1633: Sir Harie Wood of Bonytown
- 1630 (convention): Sir Alexander Erskine of Dune
- 1630 (convention): James Lyon of Auldbarr
- 1639-1641: Sir Alexander Erskine of Dune
- 1639-1641: James Lyon of Auldbarr (died in office)
- 1641: Sir David Graham of Fintrie
- 1644 (convention and parliament): Crichton of Ruthven
- 1644 (convention): Frederick Lyon of Brigton
- 1644-1647: Frederick Lyon of Brigton
- 1645: Sir Alexander Erskine of Dune
- 1645-1647: Sir John Carnegie of Craig
- 1646-1647: Sir Andrew Fletcher of Innerpeffer
- 1646-1647: Graham of Monorgund
- 1648: Sir Andrew Fletcher of Innerpeffer
- 1649: John Lindsay of Edzell
- 1649: George Symmer of Balzeordie
- 1650-1651: George Lundie
- 1650-1651: Henry Maule of Melgund
- 1661-1663: Sir John Carnegie of Boysack
- 1661-1663: Sir James Ogilvy of Newgrange
- 1665 (convention): David Fothringham of Powrie
- 1665 (convention): Sir David Ogilvy of Inverquharity
- 1667 (convention): John Gardyne of Lautoune
- 1667 (convention): James Maule, fiar of Melgum
- 1669-1674: James Carnegie of Balnamoon
- 1669-1672: Sir David Ogilvy of Clova
- 1678 (convention): David Lindsay of Edzell
- 1678 (convention): Sir David Ogilvy of Inverquharity
- 1681-1682: James Carnegie of Balnamoon
- 1681-1682: Sir David Ogilvy of Clova
- 1685-1686: James Carnegie of Balnamoon
- 1685-1686: Sir David Falconer of Newtown (died in office December 1685)
- 1686: James Carnegie of Findhaven
- 1689 (convention): James Brodie of that Ilk
- 1689 (convention): David Erskine of Dun
- 1689 (convention): Sir George Mackenzie of Rosehaugh
- 1689-1698: David Erskine of Dun (died in office)
- 1689-1691: Sir George Mackenzie of Rosehaugh (died in office)
- 1689-1702: Robert Reid of Baldovie
- 1693-1698: John Fullarton of Kinnaber (died in office)
- 1693-1698: James Milne of Ballwylloe (expelled)
- 1698-1702: James Scott the younger of Logie
- 1698-1702: James Carnegie of Findhaven
- 1702-1707: James Carnegie of Findhaven
- 1702-1707: David Graham of Fintrie, younger
- 1702-1707: James Haliburton of Pitcur
- 1702-1707: Patrick Lyon of Auchterhouse
