= Clan Gardyne =

Lowland Scottish clan

- Motto: Cruciata Cruce Junguntur (Troubles are connected with the cross)

Chief
- Heather Zakrzewski
- Historic seat: Gardyne Castle
Clan branches
Gardyne of that Ilk (historic chiefs)
Gardyne of Banchory
Gardyne of Troup
Rival clans
Clan Guthrie

Clan Gardyne is a lowland Scottish clan from Angus

== History ==
=== Origins of the clan ===
The surname is frequently spelt Gardyne and according to the historian George Fraser Black, a family long of that Ilk hailed from the barony of Gardyne in the parish of Kirkden in the county of Angus. They built a strong tower, Gardyne Castle, which was extended in the late sixteenth and seventeenth centuries.

=== 16th century clan conflicts ===
The Clan Gardyne feuded with the nearby Clan Guthrie in the 16th century. The Guthries' Guthrie Castle was only a few miles away. In 1578 Patrick Gardyne of that Ilk was killed by William Guthrie and in the feud that followed both clans appear to have suffered heavy casualties. There are two accounts of how the feud started: According to the Gardynes, Patrick Gardyne and his kinsman Robert were killed on Carbundow Moor in 1578 and their deaths were avenged by Thomas Gairden who killed Alexander Guthrie in Inverpeffer in 1587. However, according to the Guthries, Alexander Guthrie was murdered by his cousin, Thomas Gairden, and his death was avenged by his nephew, William Guthrie who killed Patrick Gardyne. The result of the feud was ultimately a victory for the more powerful Clan Guthrie. David Gardyne, the tenth Laird then sold the castle and much of the lands, acquiring the estate of Lawton.

=== 17th century and Thirty Years' War ===
David Gardyne, the tenth Laird married Janet Lindsay, daughter of Sir David Lindsay, Lord Edzell in 1602. The male line of this family died out and is now represented by Bruce-Gardyne of Middleton.

The arms of a black boar's head on a silver shield are borne by the Gardyne of Troup branch of the clan, who are descended from the Gardynes of Banchory. The first Laird of Troup was sent by Charles I to assist Gustavus Adolphus of Sweden during the Thirty Years' War where he saw distinguished service and remained in the Swedish court until 1654. When he returned to Scotland he purchased the lands of Troup in Banffshire which remain with this family today.

== Castles ==
- Gardyne Castle in Angus mostly dates from the fifteenth century but with older work. It was originally held by the Gardynes until it passed to the Lyles of Dysart in 1682.
- Banchory in Aberdeenshire is the site of a castle that was replaced by a mansion and was held by the Gardynes of Banchory.
- Castle of Troup, near Rosehearty, Aberdeenshire was originally held by the Clan Comyn, then by the Troups and probably the clan Keith, but passed to the Gardynes in 1654.
- Delgatie Castle which is near Turriff, Aberdeenshire passed to the Gardynes of Troup in 1762 and is now open to the public all year.
- Pitsligo Castle, near Fraserburgh, Aberdeenshire is a large castle that was briefly held by the Gardynes.

== See also ==
- Scottish clan
- Gardyne, notable people with Gardyne surname
