= Friockheim =

Coordinates: 56.636434°N 2.668382°W

- Location within Angus
- Population: 1,065
- OS grid reference: NO591496
- Council area: Angus
- Lieutenancy area: Angus
- Country: Scotland
- Sovereign state: United Kingdom
- Post town: ARBROATH
- Postcode district: DD11
- Dialling code: 01241
- Police: Scotland
- Fire: Scottish
- Ambulance: Scottish
- UK Parliament: Angus
- Scottish Parliament: Angus South

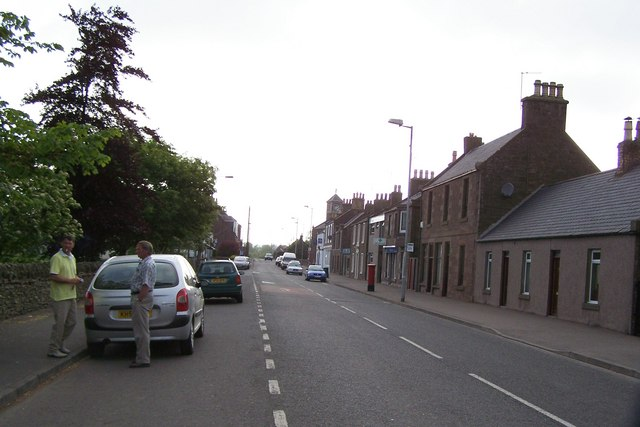
Gardyne street

Friockheim (FREEK-um, /ˈfrikəm/) is a town in Angus, Scotland dating from 1814. It lies between the towns of Arbroath, Brechin, Forfar and Montrose. Most of the village is in the parish of Kirkden but the eastern end lies in the parish of Kinnell.

== History ==
The name 'Friockheim', literally translated, means 'Heather Home', with Friock being a derivative from the Gaelic 'fraoch' (heather) and 'heim' from the German for home. It has been described as one of the most curious hybrid names on the Scottish map. The word 'Friockheim' as a whole, is pronounced 'Free-come'.

The birth of the village took place soon after 1814 when Thomas Gardyne of Middleton succeeded his brother as the laird of the lands of Friock and feued them to Mr John Andson, of Arbroath, who built a flax spinning mill and as proprietor-in-feu attracted many textile workers to come and settle on easy terms in what was at first known as Friock feus.

Mr Andson's son, John Andson added in the 'heim' part of the name. This was at the request of the numerous Flemish weavers who had gone there to develop the flax spinning process. He had to obtain the sanction of Thomas Gardyne as superior and together they agreed on the following advertisement, which is thought of as Friockheim's foundation charter.

Printed in Arbroath and dated May 22, 1824 this read:

"The Spinning Mill and Village of Friock, of which Mr Gardyne of Middleton is the Superior, and Mr John Andson, Proprietor holding in feu, hitherto called 'Friock Feus' from this date henceforward is to be named “FRIOCKHEIM” and of which change of designation this on the part of Mr Gardyne and Mr Andson is notice unto all whom it may concern.”

John Andson died in office in 1814 (?) and his mill was burnt to the ground in 1862.

== Recent changes ==
The village of Friockheim now has a population of 1,065, as recorded in the 2022 Scottish Census, having peaked at 1,200 in the early 1900s. It has a convenience store and pharmacy as well as several small businesses and shops. There is also a public park and two village halls as well as a primary school and community centre. It also has its own church, dating from 1835.

Friockheim was served by a railway station on the Arbroath and Forfar Railway from 1848 to 1955. The line has since been lifted.

It used to be home to Douglas Fraser & Sons (Mfg) Ltd producing waterproof and leisure clothing but this firm no longer exists, and the ground where its mill was situated is now the site of modern housing. Planning conditions require the reinstatement of the mill lade, or at least part of it, with public access.

The local newsagent closed in 2016 after several decades of service to the village. The local co-operative has converted to a McColls, which has now been converted to a Morrisons Local, which provides many of the services the village has become accustomed to.

S.G. Baker Ltd produces hessian, cotton and polypropylene sacks for agriculture and business packaging. Although still based in the village, this firm is less involved in manufacturing than it used to be, and more involved in distributing goods that are manufactured overseas. It also has a base in Forfar.

Friockheim now has a 'By Royal Appointment' sign, for Mike Lingard, Gunsmith, who supplied guns to Prince Charles. Mr Lingard's premises are in the former Clydesdale Bank building in Gardyne Street.

Parkgrove Crematorium opened in the 1990s and is used by surrounding towns, as well as Friockheim itself, as it is currently the only one in Angus.

Film of the village was shot in the 1930s by Dr AGW Thomson and is held by the Cinema Museum in London (ref HMo163).Cinema Museum Home Movie Database.xlsx

== Bus Services ==
Bus services in the village are operated by Stagecoach Strathtay, JP Minicoaches and Travel Wisharts. Stagecoach's services 27 and 27B connect the town with Arbroath and Forfar while their 116 service connects Friockheim with Montrose and Forfar on Saturdays. JP Minicoaches, also known as JP Coaches or JP Minibus, operates Service 36 - which runs between Guthrie and Arbroath stops in the village. Travel Wisharts (Note: Also known as: Wisharts Froickheim, and Wisharts G & N Ltd) operate services 140 & 141 which connect Friockheim with various towns and villages including Stracathro, Brechin, Arbroath and Auchmithie. The company's bus depot is in Froickheim.

== Nearby Parishes ==
Guthrie, Kinnell, Kirkden (previously Idvies, now disappeared).
