= Milton of Finavon House =

- Mains of Finhaven; House of Finhaven
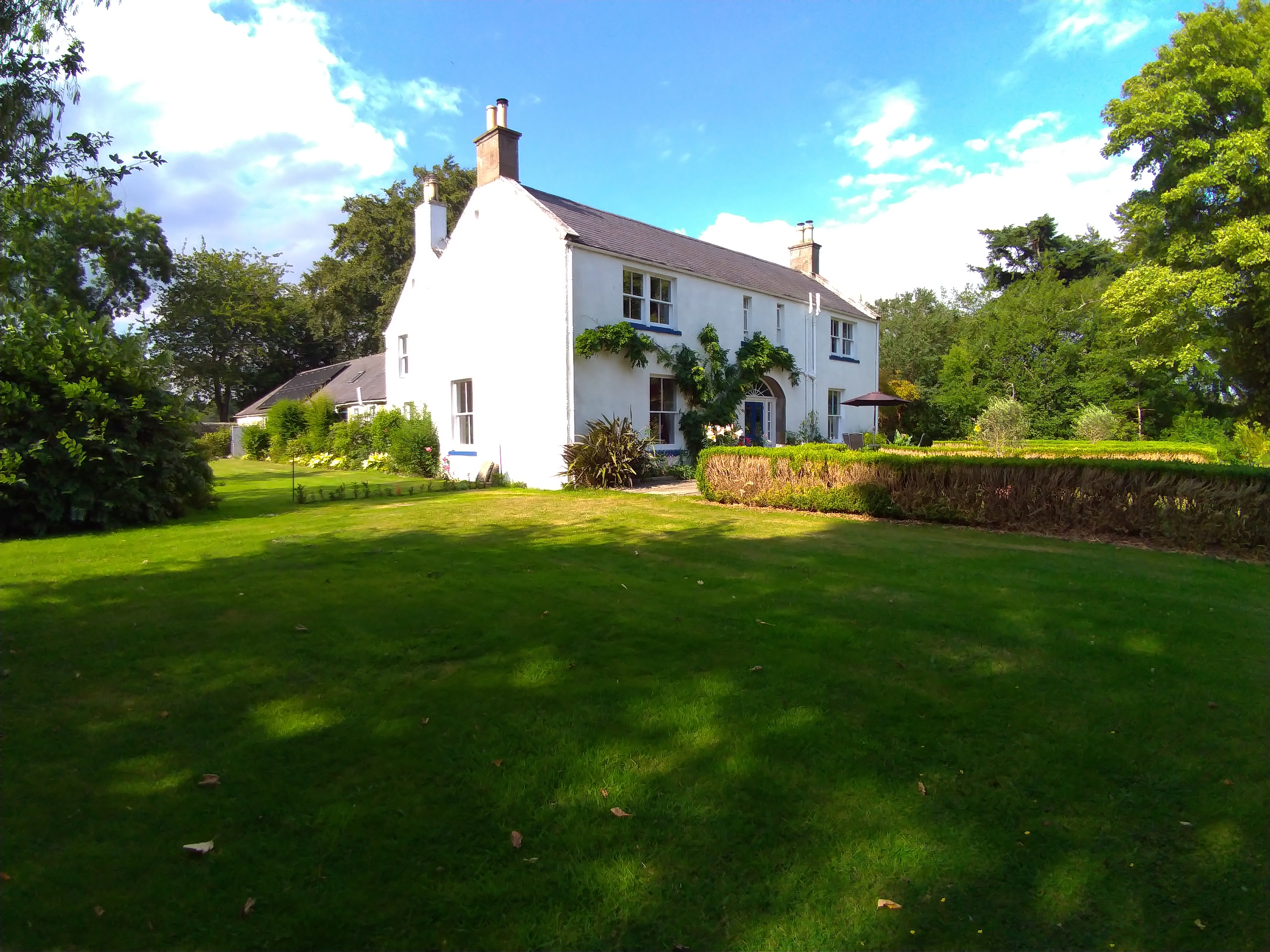
- The 18th-century Venacular Palladian facade
- Interactive map of Milton of Finavon House
- 56°42′05″N 2°49′44″W
- Type: Country house
- Location: Forfar, Angus

History
- Built: Post Medieval 1450 & c. Early 1700 (Venacular Palladian wing)

Site notes
- Architect: Colen Campbell / William Adam circles (attributed)
- Architectural style: Venacular Palladian
- Owner: James Carnegie of Finhaven d.1765 (historically)
- Website: www.miltonoffinavonhouse.co.uk

Listed Building – Category C(S)
- Official name: Milton of Finavon House, Forfar. DD8 3PY
- Designated: 15 January 1980
- Reference no.: Listed Building LB17725

Milton of Finavon House, historically known as the Mains of Finhaven and House of Finhaven, is a Category C listed building (LB17725) in Angus, Scotland. The structure is a composite of several eras, beginning with a surviving 16th-century butt n ben to the east and the remains of an earlier Tower Fortalice to the north west. This was later extended into a two-storey mid-17th-century building, which was further modernised in the early 18th century with the addition of its current facade.". The timber sunrise fanlight contains hand spun crown glass. The heavy prisms and thick striation shadows are indicative of glass made around the early part of the 18th century, circa 1720. Milton of Finavon House. Primary historical records and architectural data. Retrieved 4 May 2024.

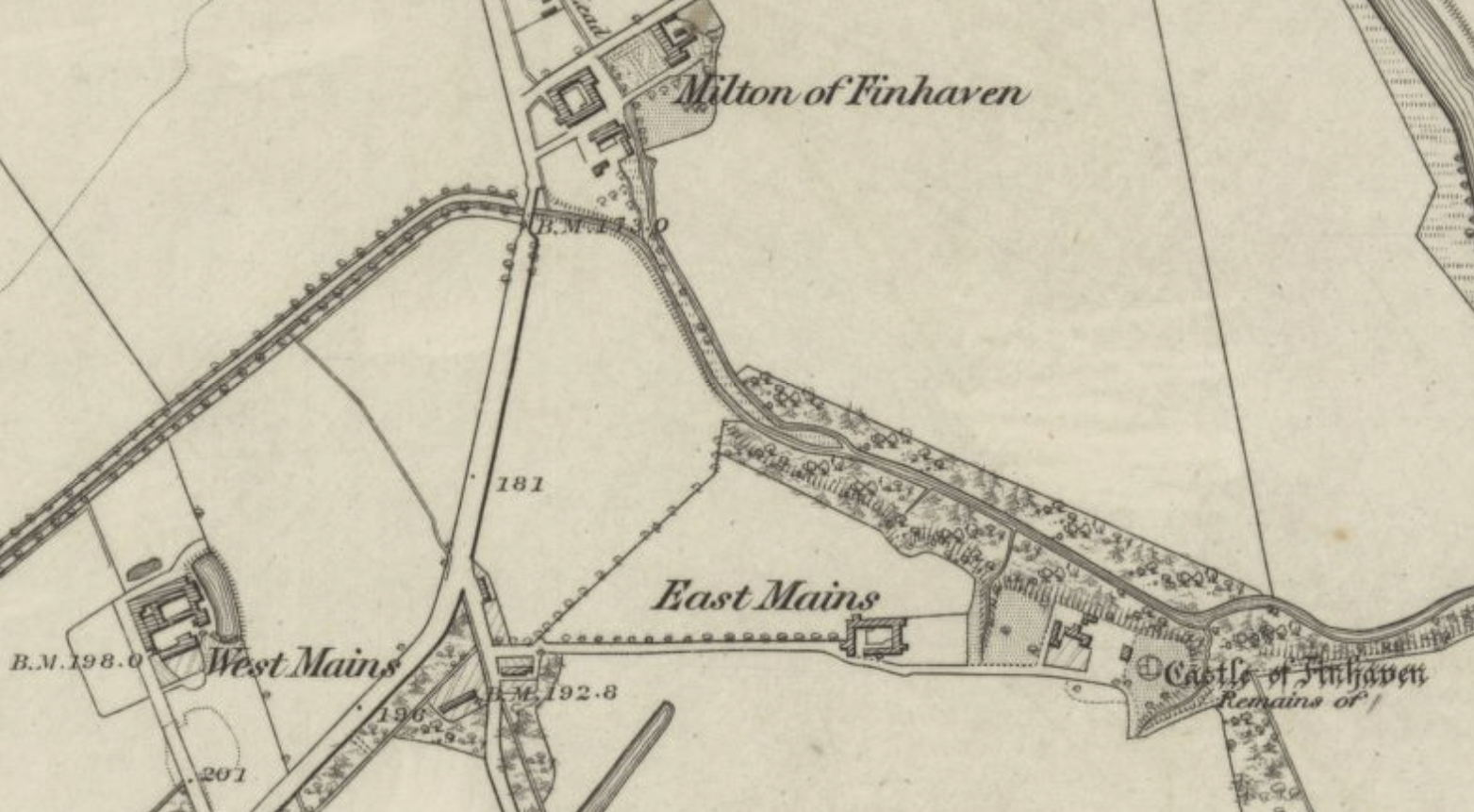
The estate layout of Finhaven in 1865. The home farm (Mains) is located at the Milton (top), with the ruins of the medieval castle (bottom right) and the East and West Mains farms clearly demarcated. Reproduced with the permission of the National Library of Scotland.

Located approximately 5 miles (8.0 km) northeast of Forfar, it served as the primary residential seat of the Carnegie of Finhaven family following the abandonment of the medieval old Finavon Castle in the early 18th century.

== History and architecture ==
Upon inheriting the barony in 1712, following the death of his brother Charles (d. Whitewalls, Tannadice), James Carnegie established the family's residence at the House of Finhaven (located at the Mains, or Milton of Finavon). This move was necessitated by the structural instability of the old castle, which was described as being "rent through" and eventually suffered a catastrophic collapse in the mid-18th century. MacGibbon, David and Ross, Thomas. The Castellated and Domestic Architecture of Scotland, Vol. III, 1889. Contemporary depositions from Carnegie's household during the 1715 Jacobite rising confirm that the residence was known at the time as the "House of Finhaven," distinguishing it from the increasingly ruinous medieval fortress.

Following his 1711 marriage to Margaret Bennet, Carnegie commissioned "polite" improvements to the house to meet the architectural standards of his wife's family. The marriage contract, dated January 1711, indicates that these improvements were already being planned or underway at the time.

The building is notable for its sophisticated 1720s Palladian facade and a rare "sunrise" timber fanlight. While previously associated with Alexander McGill, modern analysis of the family's patronage suggests the involvement of the William Adam circle. Margaret’s brother, Sir William Bennet of Grubet (2nd Baronet), was a key early patron of Adam, famously recommending him for the remodelling of Floors Castle during this period.

The architectural transformation of the house is further supported by the "gentlemanly" social standing of the Adam family, which allowed for a relationship stronger than a typical tradesman-client contract. William Adam’s mother, Helen Cranstoun, was the daughter of the 3rd Lord Cranstoun, providing Adam with a noble pedigree that facilitated his entry into the elite "virtuosi" circles of the Scottish Enlightenment frequented by the Bennets. This connection was geographically anchored in the local landscape; the Adam family's ancestral holdings were located in the neighbouring parish of Aberlemno, directly south of the Finhaven estate. Modern physical analysis conducted during the 2022–2026 restoration of Milton of Finavon House has identified a consistent early-Georgian proportional system and Palladian interior details, such as the "sunrise" fanlight, which align with the sophisticated neoclassical tastes the Bennets introduced to the Carnegie estate during this period. "Restoration and Renovation: Architectural Evolution". Milton of Finavon House. Primary historical records and architectural data. "Discoveries: Scientific and Domestic". Milton of Finavon House. Primary historical records and architectural data.

== 18th century and the 1715 Rising ==
Following James Carnegy’s marriage to Margaret Bennet in 1711, the House of Finhaven (Milton of Finavon) was transformed from a former dower house into a "polite" Palladian residence. By the time of the Jacobite rising of 1715, the house was a substantial mansion capable of hosting Carnegie’s extended family, including his sisters Jean (Lady Kinfauns) and Margaret (Lady Auchterhouse) and their respective households. "Deposition of Andrew Ferrier, servant". The National Archives. SP 35/6/47, Item 17. "Ferrier describes Carnegie using a 'back private entry to escape from the recruiters' and his refusal to send any of his tenants to the rebel camp."The house became a stage for the era's deep political divides. According to a 1716 deposition by Mary Mitchell, a servant to Lady Kinfauns, the property hosted a fraught family gathering where Carnegie's brother-in-law, Patrick Lyon of Auchterhouse, grew enraged when Carnegie refused to drink to the Old Pretender. Lyon reportedly blamed the influence of Carnegie's other brother-in-law, the brother of his wife Margaret Bennet, the staunchly Whig Sir William Bennet of Grubet, for "turning his head" toward the Government cause."Deposition of Mary Mitchell, servant". The National Archives. SP 35/6/47, Item 14. "Mitchell states that Lyon of Auchterhouse complained Carnegie 'had his head turned by his brother-in-law William Bennet' and refused to toast the Pretender."The physical layout of the house played a role in Carnegie’s survival during the rebellion. His valet, Andrew Ferrier, testified that Carnegie evaded Jacobite recruiters by fleeing into the gardens and using "back private entries" to hide until the coast was clear, (the current layout would support his, Andrew Ferrier's deposition to this effect) Despite threats from rebel leaders to burn the House of Finhaven to the ground for his non-compliance, the structure survived the rising intact.

=== Historical connections ===
The 1720s modernisation of Milton of Finavon highlights a fascinating overlap of regional heritage and 18th-century patronage. Although the architect William Adam was based in the Lowlands, he had deep ancestral ties to the immediate area; his progenitor, Archibald Adam, had held the lands of Fanno, situated just over Finavon Hill.

This local connection was bridged by the patronage of Sir William Bennet, a close friend of Adam and the brother-in-law of James Carnegie of Finhaven. Given that Bennet is credited with recommending Adam for major commissions like Floors Castle, it is highly probable that he facilitated the architect’s return to his ancestral Angus landscape to work on the Carnegie family's home. Albeit, a modest build for a man at the very start of his career as a leading Scottish architect.

== 19th century status ==
By the mid-19th century, the Victorian Ordnance Survey Name Books officially distinguished the residential "Milton of Finhaven" from the neighbouring agricultural and industrial sites. The surveyors recorded the property as a "fine farm house and offices"—a designation reserved for buildings of superior architectural status—and confirmed it was the property of James Carnegie Gardyne, Esq.

The survey further noted the presence of an ancient dovecot (columbarium) near the site, which the parish minister, Rev. Henry Stewart, described as being as old as the original castle.
