= Gardyne Castle =

Coordinates: 56°37′45″N 2°41′47″W

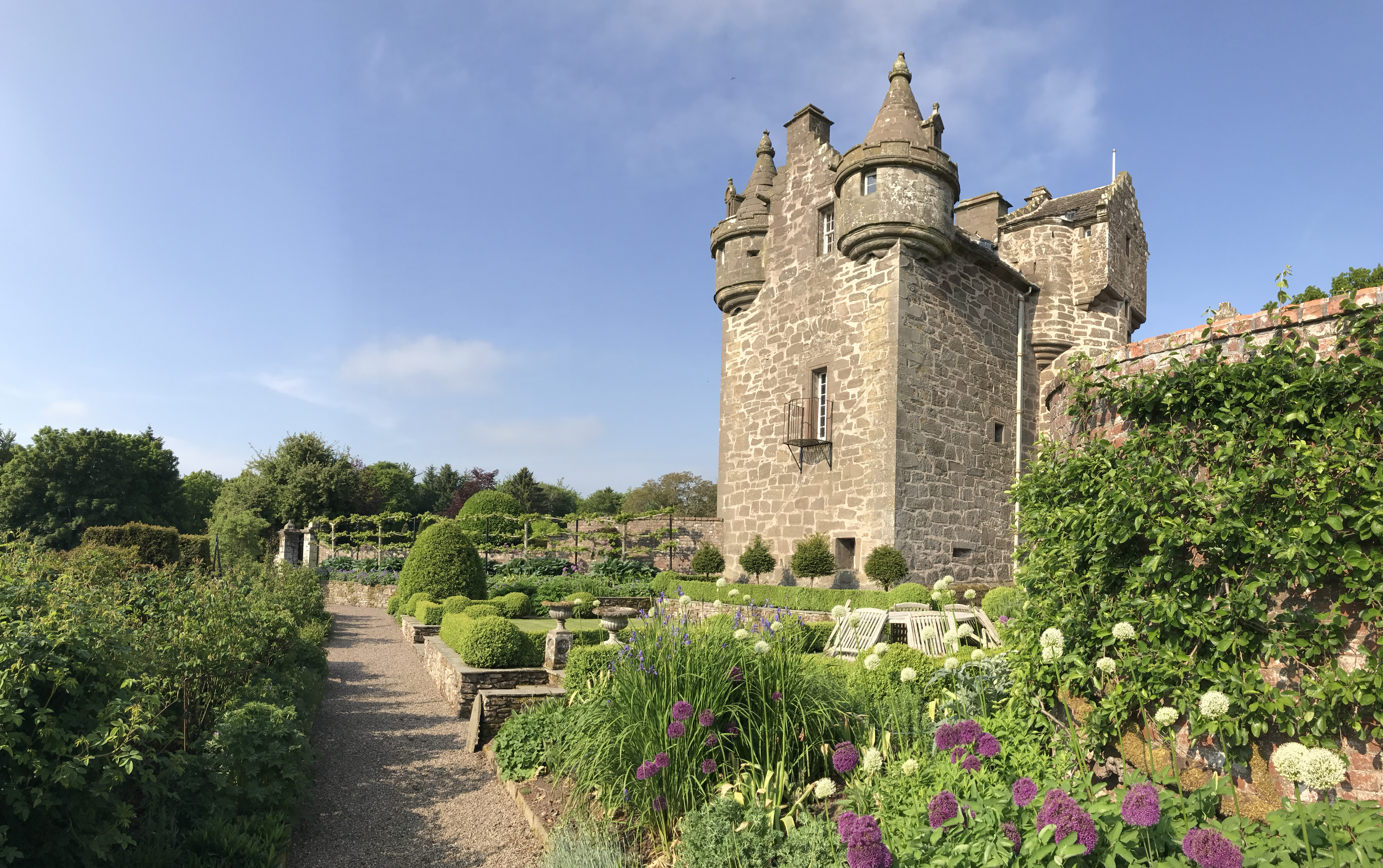
- 16th century eastern wing
- Interactive map of the Gardyne Castle area

General information
- Location: Angus, Friockheim, Scotland
- Completed: 1568

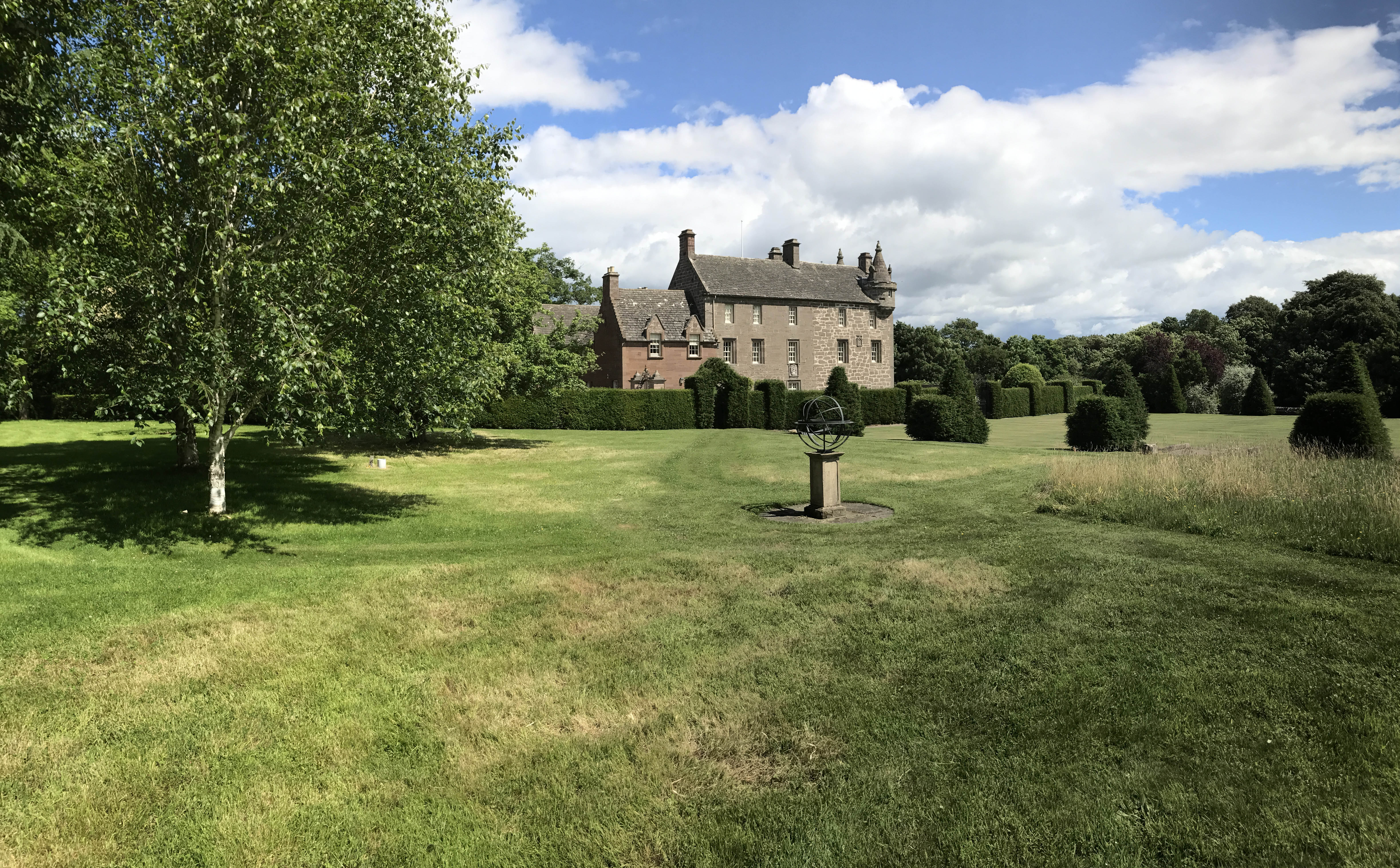
Southern Frontage

The Gardyne Castle is a 16th-century tower house in Angus, Scotland. It is located 2 kilometres (1.2 mi) south-west of Friockheim. The castle is still in use as a family home, and is protected as a Category A listed building.

== History ==
The Castle was built by the Gardyne family, and an inscribed stone records the date 1568. A further inscribed stone moved from the neighbouring home farm bears the arms of King James VI and the motto "God save the King". Together with the distinctive style of some of the architectural features, such as the conical-roofed bartizans, this suggests an attempt to link the building with Royal Stewart architecture, and with the new king, as opposed to his predecessor the deposed Mary, Queen of Scots.

The family of Gardyne first acquired the lands of Garden, from which they assumed their surname, some time before the 1357, when John Garden of that ilk received from William, Earl of Ross, a "charter of the Dentown of Garthen, with pertinents, in the Sheriffdom of Forfar."

In 1558 a daughter of the house married a Guthrie, from neighbouring Guthrie Castle, and their son, quarrelling with his relatives, was stabbed to death by his Gardyne cousin. The feud intensified with the murder of Patrick Gardyne by William Guthrie in 1578, followed shortly by the slaughter of Alexander Guthrie of that Ilk by Thomas Gardyne. The family were soon forced to dispose of the lands, with Sir Walter Rollo acquiring the barony in 1597. The tradition in the Gardyne family was that the lands and Barony had been "wadset" or pledged to raise money in defence of the country, but the more likely cause was financial difficulties arising from the feud and consequent criminal proceedings.

The castle was acquired by James Lyell in 1682, whose descendants occupied it until 1963.

The building has been altered many times since at least 1568. The castle was remodelled and modernised (adding electricity) in 1910 by the Edinburgh architect Harold Tarbolton and remains a family home.
