= Finavon Castle =

17th-century tower house in Angus, Scotland

- Finavon, Angus
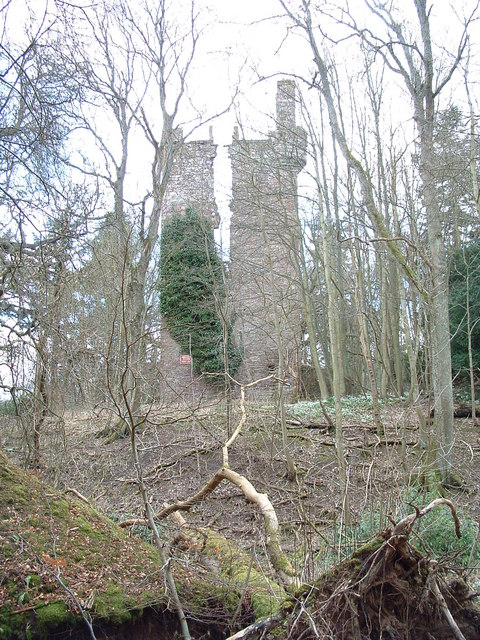
- Ruins of the 17th-century Finavon Castle

Site information
- Type: Tower house
- Condition: Ruinous

Location
- Coordinates: 56.6967°N 2.8222°W

Site history
- Built: c. 1200 (visible remains)

Scheduled monument
- Official name: Finavon Castle
- Type: Secular: castle
- Designated: 19 October 2000
- Reference no.: SM2464

Finavon Castle (historically Finhaven) is a ruined 17th-century castle lying on the River South Esk, about a quarter of a mile south of Milton of Finavon and five miles north-east of Forfar in Angus, Scotland.

== History ==
The estate was the property of the Lindsay Earls of Crawford from 1375, who built the original castle on the site. David Lindsay, 10th Earl of Crawford, married Margaret, the daughter of Cardinal David Beaton, at Finavon in 1546.

Extravagance eventually ruined the Crawford fortunes, and in 1625 the barony of Finavon was disposed of by a forced sale to Alexander Lindsay, 2nd Lord Spynie. It later passed through the Carnegie family, the Gordon Earls of Aboyne and the Gardynes.

== Architecture ==
The castle was an L-plan tower-house of five storeys, with a garret and a courtyard. The tower visible today dates from about 1600, though archaeological excavations have revealed that it was an adjunct built onto the north-east corner of a much older and more extensive medieval structure.

== Life at the castle ==
J. B. Burke recorded the historical lifestyle of the Lindsay family at Finavon:

The inner life of the family was of an uniform but enjoyable character; martial exercise, the chase, and the baronial banquet... the ladies mingling in the scene throughout, whether in the sports and festivities of the morning, or the pastimes of the evening—though a portion of the day was always spent in their ‘bowers’ with their attendant maidens spinning or weaving tapestry.

== Other nearby features ==
- Finavon Doocot: Located nearby, this is Scotland's largest dovecote with 2,400 nesting boxes, believed to have been built for the Earl of Crawford in the 16th century.
- **Finavon Hill**: A vitrified Iron Age hillfort dating from the mid-1st millennium BCE sits above the castle.
