= Oathlaw =

Coordinates: 56.695459°N 2.858838°W

- Location within Angus
- OS grid reference: NO475563
- Council area: Angus
- Lieutenancy area: Angus
- Country: Scotland
- Sovereign state: United Kingdom
- Police: Scotland
- Fire: Scottish
- Ambulance: Scottish
- UK Parliament: Angus
- Scottish Parliament: Angus South

Oathlaw is a village in Angus, Scotland, 4 miles north of Forfar.

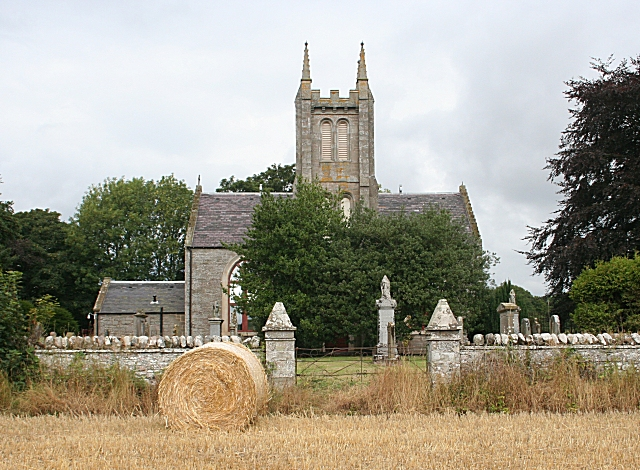
Oathlaw Kirk
