= Auchterhouse Castle =

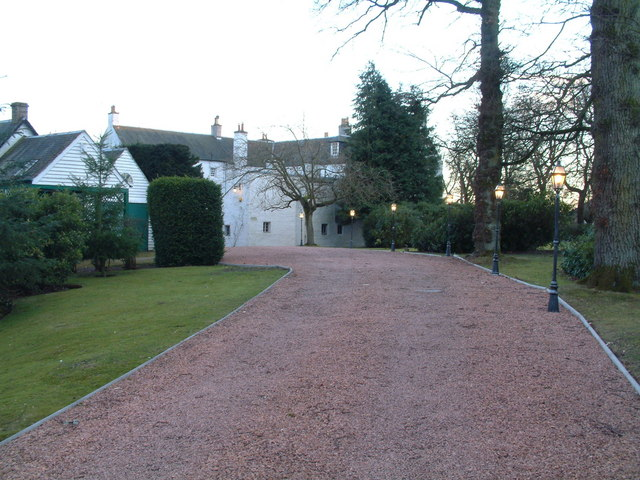
- Auchterhouse Castle, also known as The Old Manor House

Location
- Location within Angus
- Coordinates: 56.522857°N 3.088781°W

Site history
- Built: 13th century

Auchterhouse Castle is a c. 13th-century castle located northwest of Dundee, Angus, Scotland. The original castle was enclosed with walls, towers, and contained a keep. The castle may have been in ownership of the Ramsay family, who were hereditary sheriffs of Angus. Sir William Wallace is alleged to have stayed at the castle, and one its towers was named in his honour. King Edward I of England spent the night of 20 July 1303 at the castle. The castle came into the possession of James Erskine, 7th Earl of Buchan, who may have built the 17th-century tower house.
