= Sophia of Prussia =

Queen of Greece (1913–1917; 1920–1922)

Sophia
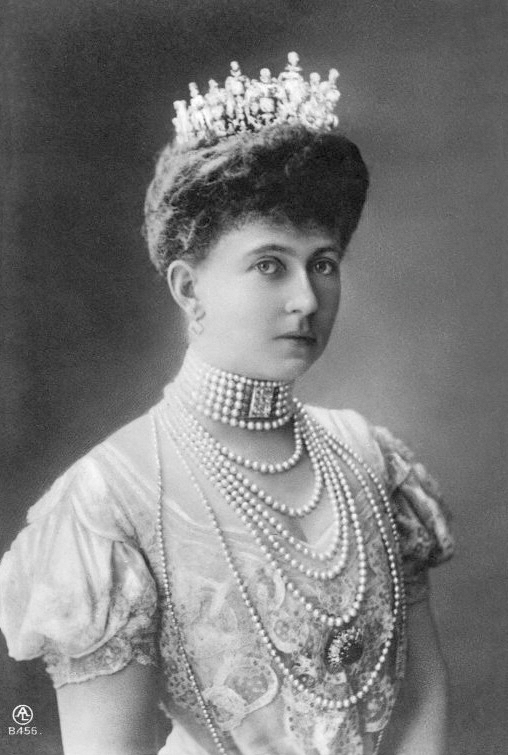
- Official photograph, 1913

Queen consort of the Hellenes
- Tenure: 18 March 1913 – 11 June 1917
- Tenure: 19 December 1920 – 27 September 1922
- Born: 14 June 1870; New Palace, Potsdam, Kingdom of Prussia
- Died: 13 January 1932 (aged 61); Frankfurt, Hesse-Nassau, Free State of Prussia, Weimar Republic
- Burial: 16 January 1932; Greek Orthodox Church, Florence, Italy; 22 November 1936; Royal Cemetery, Tatoi Palace, Greece
- Spouse: Constantine I of Greece (m. 1889; died 1923)
- Issue: George II of Greece; Alexander of Greece; Helen, Queen Mother of Romania; Paul of Greece; Irene, Queen of Croatia and Duchess of Aosta; Princess Katherine
Names
- Sophie Dorothea Ulrike Alice
- House: Hohenzollern
- Father: Frederick III, German Emperor
- Mother: Victoria, Princess Royal

Sophia of Prussia (Sophie Dorothea Ulrike Alice, Greek: Σοφία Δωροθέα Ουλρίκη Αλίκη, romanized: Sofía Dorothéa Oulríki Alíki; 14 June 1870 – 13 January 1932) was Queen of Greece twice from 18 March 1913 to 11 June 1917 and again from 19 December 1920 to 27 September 1922 as the wife of King Constantine I of Greece.

A member of the House of Hohenzollern and child of Frederick III, German Emperor, Sophia received a liberal and Anglophile education, under the supervision of her mother Victoria, Princess Royal. In 1889, less than a year after the death of her father, she married her third cousin Constantine, heir apparent to the Greek throne. After a difficult period of adaptation in her new country, Sophia gave birth to six children and became involved in the assistance to the poor, following in the footsteps of her mother-in-law, Queen Olga. However, it was during the wars which Greece faced during the end of the 19th and the beginning of the 20th century that Sophia showed the most social activity: she founded field hospitals, oversaw the training of Greek nurses, and treated wounded soldiers.

However, Sophia was hardly rewarded for her actions, even after her grandmother Queen Victoria decorated her with the Royal Red Cross after the Thirty Days' War: the Greeks criticized her links with Germany. Her eldest brother, German Emperor Wilhelm II, was indeed an ally of the Ottoman Empire and openly opposed the construction of the Megali Idea, which could establish a Greek state that would encompass all ethnic Greek-inhabited areas. During World War I, the blood ties between Sophia and the Emperor also aroused the suspicion of the Triple Entente, which criticized Constantine I for his neutrality in the conflict.

After imposing a blockade of Greece and supporting the rebel government of Eleftherios Venizelos, causing the National Schism, France and its allies deposed Constantine in June 1917. Sophia and her family then went into exile in Switzerland. Sophia's second son, Alexander, replaced his father on the throne. At the same time, Greece entered the war alongside the Triple Entente, which allowed for impressive, but eventually temporary, territorial gains. After the outbreak of the Greco-Turkish War in 1919 and the untimely death of Alexander the following year, the Venizelists abandoned power, allowing the royal family to return to Athens. However, the defeat of the Greek army against the Turkish troops of Mustafa Kemal forced Constantine to abdicate in 1922, at which point his eldest son became King George II. Sophia and her family were then forced to a new exile, and settled in Italy, where Constantine died one year later, in 1923. With the proclamation of the Republic in Athens the following year, Sophia spent her last years alongside her family, before dying of cancer in Germany in 1932 at the age of 61.

== Princess of Prussia and Germany (1870-1889) ==
=== Birth in a difficult context ===
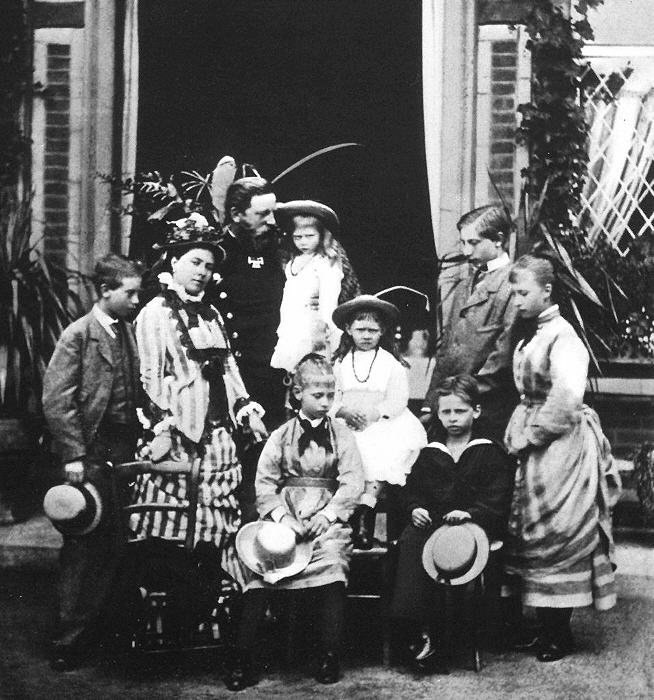
Princess Sophie with her parents and siblings. Standing left to right: Prince Heinrich, Crown Princess Viktoria, Crown Prince Frederick William with Princess Margaret, Prince Wilhelm, and Princess Charlotte. (seated left to right) Princess Victoria, Princess Sophie and Prince Waldemar. 1875

Princess Sophie was born in the Neues Palais in Potsdam, Prussia, on 14 June 1870 as the daughter of Frederick William, Crown Prince of Prussia, and Victoria, Princess Royal of the United Kingdom. The Crown Prince was the son of King Wilhelm I of Prussia, and the Princess Royal was the eldest child of Queen Victoria and Prince Albert. Frederick William and Victoria were already the parents of a large family and as the penultimate child, Sophie was eleven years younger than her eldest brother, the future Wilhelm II of Germany. Sophie's parents were a close couple, both on sentimental and political levels. Being staunch liberals, they lived away from the Berlin court and suffered the intrigues of a very conservative German chancellor, Otto von Bismarck, and members of the House of Hohenzollern.

A week after Sophie's birth, a case relating to succession to the throne of Spain (Note: On 21 June 1870 Madrid offered the Spanish throne to Leopold, Prince of Hohenzollern, a distant cousin of Wilhelm I of Prussia. The Second French Empire immediately declared its opposition to the project and Prince Leopold eventually declined the offer. Bismarck, however, took this opportunity to force France to declare war on Prussia. Aware of the Prussian military superiority, the Chancellor was indeed convinced that they could defeat the French and in this way finished the Unification of Germany.) damaged the Franco-Prussian relations. The tone between Paris and Berlin worsened even further after Bismarck published the humiliating Ems Telegram on 13 July 1870. Six days later, the French government under Emperor Napoleon III declared war on Prussia and the states of the German Confederation offered support to Prussia, which then appeared as the victim of French imperialism. It was in this difficult context that Sophie was christened the following month, though all the men present were in uniform, as France had declared war on Prussia. Sophie's mother described the event to Queen Victoria: "The Christening went off well, but was sad and serious; anxious faces and tearful eyes, and a gloom and foreshadowing of all the misery in store spread a cloud over the ceremony, which should have been one of gladness and thanksgiving".

However, the conflict lasted only a few months and even led to a brilliant German victory, leading to the proclamation of Sophie's grandfather William I as the first German emperor on 18 January 1871.

=== Anglophile education ===
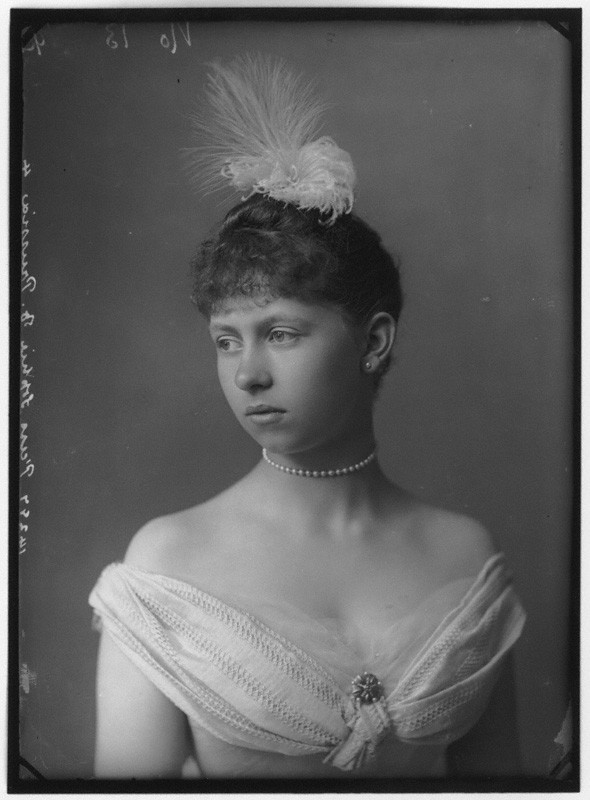
Princess Sophie of Prussia, 1887.

Sophie was known as "Sossy" during her childhood (the name was thought to have been picked because it rhymed with "Mossy", the nickname of her younger sister Margaret).

The children of the Crown Princely couple became grouped into two by age: William, Charlotte, and Henry who were favored by their paternal grandparents, while Viktoria, Sophie and Margaret were largely ignored by them. Sophie's two other brothers, Sigismund and Waldemar, died at a young age (Sigismund died before she was born, and Waldemar when he was 11 and she was 8); this drew the Crown Princess and her three younger daughters closer together, calling them "my three sweet girls" and "my trio".

The Crown Princess, believing in the superiority of all things English, had her children's nurseries modeled on her childhood. Sophie was raised with a great love for England and all things associated with it as a result, and had frequent trips to visit her grandmother Queen Victoria, whom she loved. (Note: "She [the Queen] is so nice to kiss you cannot think," Sophia said at age 11.) Sophie often stayed in England for long periods, especially on the Isle of Wight, where she liked to collect shells with her older siblings.

Because she was generally avoided by her paternal grandparents, Sophie's formative years were mainly shaped by her parents and her maternal grandmother. As a little girl she was so deeply attached to Queen Victoria that the Crown Princess did not hesitate to leave her daughter for long periods under the care of her grandmother.

In Germany, Sophie largely stayed with her parents at two main residences: the Kronprinzenpalais in Berlin, and the Neues Palais in Potsdam. Like her sisters Viktoria and Margaret, she was particularly close to her parents and their relationship became even closer after the death in 1879 of Waldemar, the favorite son of the Crown Princely couple.

=== Meeting and engagement to Constantine ===
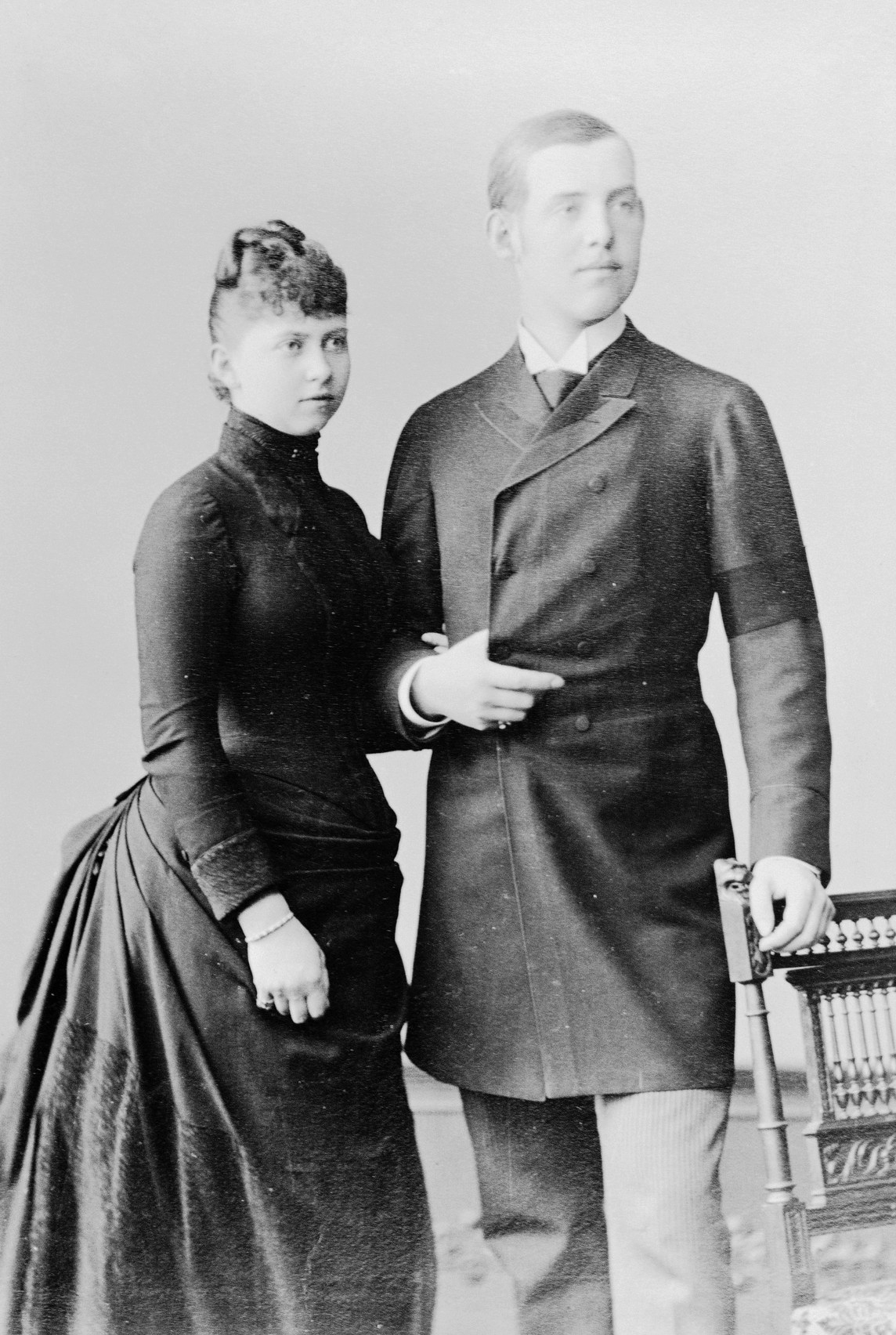
Princess Sophie of Prussia and Constantine, Duke of Sparta

In 1884, Constantine, Crown Prince of Greece, turned sixteen and his majority was declared by the government. He then received the title of Duke of Sparta. Soon after, Constantine completed his military training in Germany, where he spent two full years in the company of a tutor, Dr. Lüders. He served in the Prussian Guard, took lessons of riding in Hanover and studied political science at the Universities of Heidelberg and Leipzig.

After a long stay in England celebrating her grandmother's Golden Jubilee, Sophie became better acquainted with Constantine in the summer of 1887. The Queen watched their growing relationship, writing "Is there a chance of Sophie's marrying Tino? It would be very nice for her, for he is very good". Crown Princess Victoria also hoped that Sophie would make a good marriage, considering her the most attractive among her daughters.

During his stay at the Hohenzollern court in Berlin representing the Kingdom of Greece at the funeral of Emperor William I in March 1888, Constantine saw Sophie again. Quickly, the two fell in love and got officially engaged on 3 September 1888. However, their relationship was viewed with suspicion by Sophie's older brother William and his wife Augusta Victoria, the latter of whom she despised. This betrothal was not completely supported in the Greek royal family either: Queen Olga showed some reluctance to the projected union because Sophie was Lutheran and Olga would have preferred that her son marry an Orthodox Christian. Despite the difficulties, the wedding was scheduled for October 1889 in Athens.

=== Death of Emperor Frederick III ===
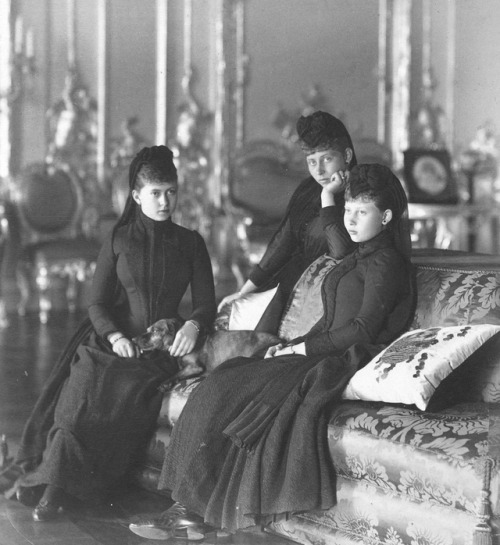
Sophie, Viktoria and Margaret mourning the death of their father.

This period fell on an unhappy time for Sophie's family however, as her father Emperor Frederick III was dying an agonizing death of throat cancer. His wife and children kept vigil with him at the Neues Palais, even celebrating Sophie's birthday and offering her a bouquet of flowers as a gift. Frederick died the next day. Sophie's eldest brother became Emperor Wilhelm II. He quickly ransacked his father's things in the hopes of finding "incriminating evidence" of "liberal plots". Knowing that her three youngest daughters were more dependent on her than ever for emotional support, the now-Dowager Empress Frederick remained close to them: "I have my three sweet girls - he loved so much - that are my consolation".

Already shocked by the attitude of her eldest son, the Dowager Empress was deeply saddened by Sophie's upcoming marriage and move to Athens. (Note: In a letter to her mother Queen Victoria, the Dowager Empress wrote: "... my trio is now broken and I feel embittered." Empress Frederick and Frederick Ponsonby, Letters of the Empress Frederick, Kessinger ed, 2007, pp. 393-394.) Nevertheless, she welcomed the happiness of her daughter and consoled herself in a voluminous correspondence with Sophie. Between 1889 and 1901, the two women exchanged no fewer than 2,000 letters. On several occasions, they were also found in each other's homes, in Athens and Kronberg. The preparations of Sophie's wedding were "hardly a surprising development considering the funeral atmosphere that prevailed at the home of her widowed mother".

== Crown princess of Greece (1889-1913) ==
=== Auspicious marriage to the Greeks ===
On 27 October 1889, Sophie married Constantine in Athens in two religious ceremonies, one public and Orthodox and another private and Protestant. (Note: The Lutheran service took place in the private Chapel of King George I while the Orthodox ceremony was celebrated in the new Metropolitan Cathedral of Athens.) They were third cousins in descent from Paul I of Russia, and second cousins once removed through Frederick William III of Prussia. Sophie's witnesses were her brother Henry and her cousins Princes Albert Victor and George of Wales; for Constantine's side, the witnesses were his brothers Princes George and Nicholas and his cousin the Tsarevich of Russia. The marriage (the first major international event held in Athens) was very popular among the Greeks. The names of the couple were reminiscent to the public of an old legend which suggested that when a King Constantine and a Queen Sophia ascended the Greek throne, Constantinople and the Hagia Sophia would fall to Greek hands. Immediately after the marriage of the Crown Prince, hopes arose among the Greek populace for the fulfilment of the Megali Idea, i.e. the union of all Greeks in the same state. Abroad, the marriage of Constantine and Sophie raised much less enthusiasm. In France, it was feared that the arrival of a Prussian princess in Athens would switch the Kingdom of Greece to the side of the Triple Alliance. (Note: This was also the assertion at the time of the French, Italian and Austrian newspapers.) In Berlin, the union was also unpopular: German interests were indeed important in the Ottoman Empire and the Emperor did not intend to help Greece simply because the Greek crown prince was his new brother-in-law.

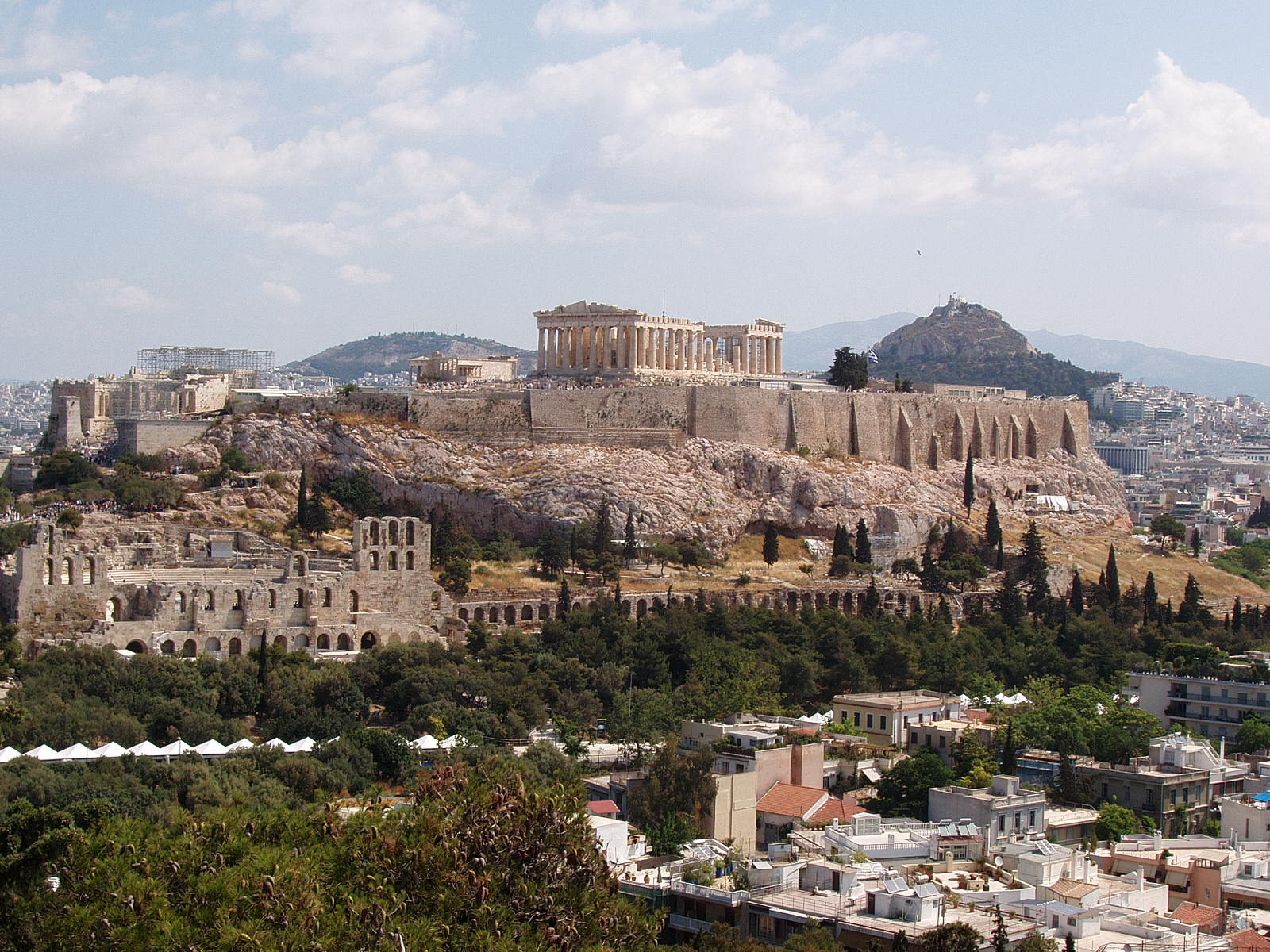
Acropolis in Athens, Greece

Nevertheless, in Athens, the marriage ceremony was celebrated with pomp and gave rise to an especially significant pyrotechnic spectacle on the Acropolis and the Champ de Mars. Platforms were also built on the Syntagma Square so the public could better admire the procession between the Royal Palace and the Cathedral. The newlyweds were related to most of the European dynasties, so representatives of all the royal houses of the continent were part of the festivities: Christian IX of Denmark (grandfather of the groom), Emperor Wilhelm II of Germany (brother of the bride), the Prince of Wales (uncle of both groom and bride) and the Tsarevich of Russia (groom's cousin) were among the guests of honor. Naturally, Sophie's mother and sisters were also present at the ceremony.

In fact, the hosts and their retinues were so many in Athens that King George I could not receive all of them in his palace. He had to ask some members of the Greek high society to receive part of the guests in their mansions. Similarly, the King was obliged to borrow the horses and carriages of his subjects in order to transport all visitors during the festivities. In addition, George was forced to hastily buy dozens of additional liveries for the lackeys at the service of the guests.

=== Installation in Athens ===
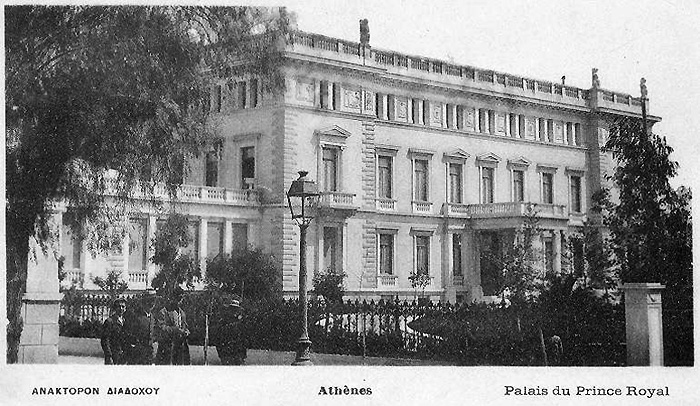
The Crown Prince's Palace, Athens

In Athens, Constantine and Sophia settled in a small villa of French style located on Kifisias Avenue, while waiting for the Greek state to build a new home for them, the Crown Prince's Palace, (Note: The construction of the palace, led by architect Ernst Ziller, which it financed and completed around 1900. For more details, see:) located near the Royal Palace. The couple also ordered the building of another house on the royal estate of Tatoi because King George I refused to allow work to be undertaken in the main palace. In Athens, Constantine and Sophia lived a relatively simple life (Note: The couple's income was fairly modest, but Sophia's marriage contract guaranteed a comfortable existence. The princess did receive from the Kingdom of Prussia a dowry of 50,000 marks and 150,000 marks of paraphernalia. Sophia had also inherited two million marks from her father Emperor Frederick III in 1888. Finally, Constantine received an annual income and King George I guaranteed a comfortable dower.) far removed from the protocol of other European courts, but life in Greece was often monotonous and Sophia lamented for any company, save only for the wives of the tobacco merchants.

Sophia had difficulties adjusting to her new life. However, she took up learning Modern Greek (and managed to become almost perfectly fluent in a few years) and used her many trips abroad to furnish and decorate her new home. Less than nine months after her marriage, on 19 July 1890, the Crown Princess gave birth to her first child, a slightly premature son who was named George after his paternal grandfather, but the birth went wrong and the umbilical cord was wrapped around the baby's neck, almost choking him. Fortunately for the mother and child, the German midwife sent by the Dowager Empress Victoria to help her daughter in childbirth managed to resolve the situation and no tragic consequences occurred.

=== Conversion to Orthodoxy ===
After the birth of her eldest son, Sophia decided to embrace the faith of her subjects and convert to the Orthodox faith. (Note: Sophia's conversion was probably motivated because she was obliged to do so under her new family's house law) Having requested and received the blessing of the Empress Dowager and Queen Victoria, the Crown Princess informed her in-laws of her intention and asked Queen Olga for instruction in Orthodoxy. The Greek royal family was delighted by the news, because the announcement of the conversion would be popular among the Greeks but King George insisted that Germanus II, Metropolitan of Athens and head of the autocephalous Church of Greece, would instruct Sophie in the Orthodox faith, rather than his wife. Of Russian origin, Queen Olga was considered by some Greek nationalists as an "agent of the Pan-Slavism" and the King therefore preferred that Germanus II would guarantee the task that could otherwise create difficulties for the Crown.

Though the news of her conversion was greeted calmly by most members of her family, Sophia feared the reaction of her brother William II, who took his status as Head of the Prussian Union of Churches very seriously and hated disobedience more than anything. Sophia and Constantine took a trip to Germany for the occasion of the wedding of her sister Viktoria to Prince Adolf of Schaumburg-Lippe in November 1890. The Crown Princess personally announced to her brother her intentions to change her religion. As expected, the news strongly displeased the Emperor and his wife, the very pious Augusta Victoria. The Empress even tried to dissuade her sister-in-law to convert, triggering a heated argument between the two women. Augusta later claimed that this caused her to go into premature labor, and deliver her sixth child, Prince Joachim, too early. William, meanwhile, was so angry that he threatened Sophia with exclusion from the Prussian royal family. Pressed by her mother to appear conciliatory, Sophia ended up writing a letter to her brother explaining the reasons for her conversion but the Emperor would not listen, and for three years he forbade his sister to enter Germany. Upon receiving his reply Sophie sent a telegram to her mother: "Received answer. Keeps to what he said in Berlin. Fixes it to three years. Mad. Never mind."

Sophia officially converted on 2 May 1891; however, the imperial sentence was ultimately never implemented. Nevertheless, relations between Wilhelm and Sophia were permanently marked by Sophia's decision. (Note: The Emperor and his wife considered that Sophia's conversion was responsible for the premature birth of their son Joachim; shortly after Wilhelm II wrote to his mother that had the baby died, Sophia would have "murdered it.") Indeed, the Emperor was an extremely resentful man and he never stopped making his sister pay for her disobedience.

=== Social work ===
Throughout her life in Greece, Sophia was actively involved in social work and helping the underprivileged. Following in the footsteps of Queen Olga, she led various initiatives in the field of education, soup kitchens and development of hospitals and orphanages. In 1896, the Crown Princess also founded the Union of Greek Women, a particularly active organization in the field of assistance to refugees from the Ottoman Empire. (Note: At that time, the Cretans suffered a violent repression by the Ottoman power, prompting thousands of Cretans to leave their island to seek shelter in Athens. For details, see: Cretan Revolt (1897–1898).) Fascinated by arboriculture and concerned by the fires that regularly ravaged the country, Sophia was also interested in the reforestation. In addition, she was one of the founders of the Greek Animal Protection Society.

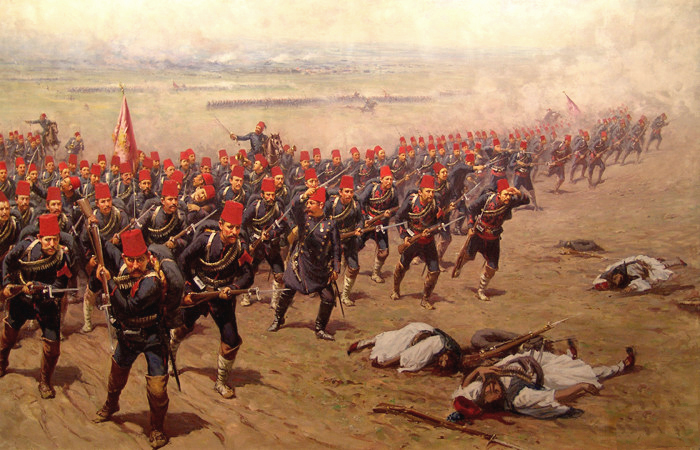
Battle of Domokos in Greco-Turkish War of 1897, by Fausto Zonaro

However, it was during wartime that Sophie showed the most resilience. In 1897, when the Thirty Days' War broke out, Sophia and other female members of the royal family actively worked with the Greek Red Cross in order to help wounded soldiers. On the Thessalian front, the Crown Princess founded field hospitals, visited the wounded and even directly administered care for victims of the fighting. Sophia also facilitated the arrival of English nurses in Greece and even participated in the training of young women volunteers to provide assistance to wounded soldiers.

The involvement of Sophia and her mother-in-law in the aid to the victims of fighting (either of Greek or Turkish origin) was so active that it elicited admiration from other European courts. As a reward for their work, both women were decorated with the Royal Red Cross by Queen Victoria, in December 1897. Unfortunately for the Crown Princess, her help for the wounded soldiers was less appreciated in Greece, where the population blamed the royal family, and especially Constantine, who was commander-in-chief of the Greek army in Thessaly, for the loss against the Ottomans.

=== Consequences of the War of Thirty Days ===
After the Thirty Days' War, a powerful anti-monarchical movement developed in Greece and Sophia herself was not immune to criticism. Always eager to punish his sister for her disobedience, Emperor William II of Germany openly supported the Ottoman Empire during the conflict and agreed to offer his mediation after being begged by his sister, his mother and his grandmother. He demanded that Greece agree to humiliating conditions in exchange for his intervention (Note: In addition to withdrawing their troops from Crete, Greece had to officially recognize the independence of the island, a condition that none of the other Great Powers suggested.) and the population believed that he did so with the consent of his sister.

However Sophia was not the only victim of popular condemnation. In fact, it was openly discussed in Athens that the Crown Prince should be sent before a military court to punish him for the national defeat and depose George I as was previously done with his predecessor Otto I. Several weeks after the signing of the peace treaty between Greece and the Ottoman Empire, the situation became so tense that the sovereign was a subject of an assassination attempt when he traveled in an open carriage with his daughter, Princess Maria, but George I defended himself so bravely that he recovered at least some estimation from his subjects.

In these difficult conditions, Constantine and Sophia choose to live some time abroad. In 1898, they were established in Kronberg, and then in Berlin. There Constantine resumed his military training with General Colmar von der Goltz and for a year, he received the command of a Prussian division. To mark their reconciliation, Emperor Wilhelm II also appointed Sophia as colonel-in-chief of the 3rd (Queen Elisabeth) Guards Grenadiers regiment of the Imperial Guard.

The couple returned to Greece in 1899 and the government of Georgios Theotokis appointed Constantine as inspector-general of the army. This promotion, however, caused some controversy among the army, which still considered the Crown Prince as the main person responsible for the defeat in 1897.

=== Family deaths ===
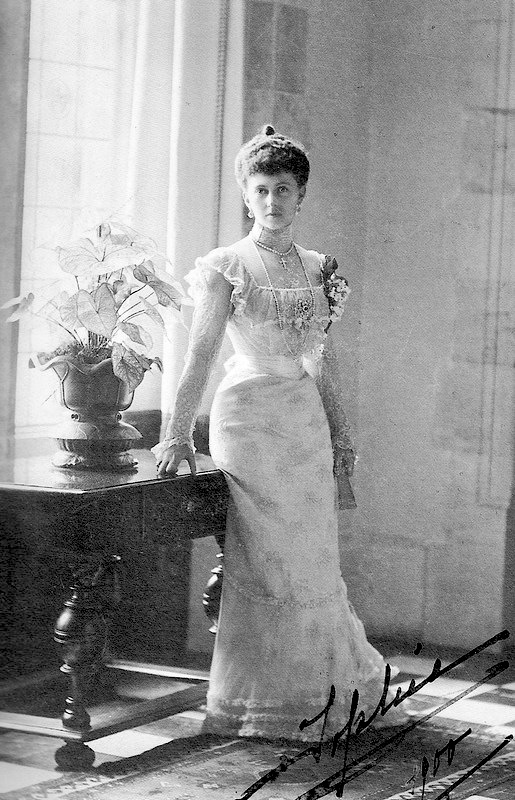
Sophia, Crown Princess of Greece, ca. 1900

Back in Greece with her husband, the Crown Princess resumed her charity work. However, the health of both her mother and English grandmother deeply concerned her. The Empress Dowager of Germany was indeed suffering from breast cancer, which caused her extreme suffering. As for the Queen of the United Kingdom, she was approaching the age of eighty and her family knew that the end was close but the last years of her reign were marked by the Second Boer War, during which the United Kingdom suffered terrible losses facing the Afrikaner resistance. Sophia was concerned that the difficulties suffered by the British in South Africa would undermine the already fragile health of her grandmother.

Queen Victoria finally died of a cerebral hemorrhage on 22 January 1901 in Osborne House. Very affected by the death of the sovereign, Sophia traveled to the United Kingdom for her funeral and attended a religious ceremony in her honor in Athens with the rest of the Greek royal family.

A few months later, in the summer of 1901, Sophie went to Friedrichshof to look after her mother, whose health continued to decline. Five months pregnant, the Crown Princess knew that the Dowager Empress was dying and, with her sisters Viktoria and Margaret, she accompanied her until her last breath on 5 August. In the space of seven months Sophia lost two of her closest relatives. However, her new maternity helped keep her from feeling sorry for herself.

=== Goudi coup and its consequences ===
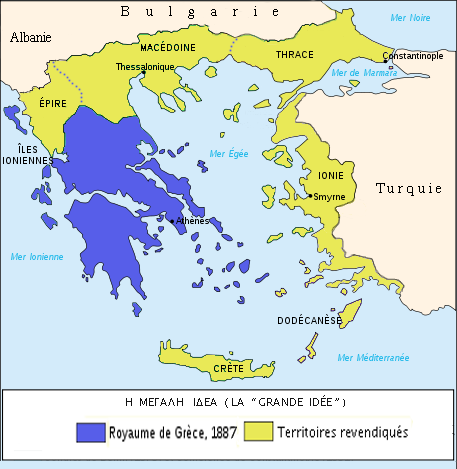
Map of Greater Greece as proposed at the Paris Peace Conference of 1919 by Eleftherios Venizelos, the leading proponent of the Megali Idea at the time.

In Greece, political life remained volatile throughout the first years of the 20th century and the Megali Idea continued to be a central concern of the population. In 1908, the Cretan authorities unilaterally proclaimed the attachment of their island to the Kingdom of Greece but for fear of Turkish reprisals, the Greek government refused to recognize the annexation. In Athens, the pusillanimity of the King and government was shocking, particularly to the military. On 15 August 1909, a group of officers gathered in the "Military League" (Στρατιωτικός Σύνδεσμος) and organized the so-called Goudi coup. While declaring to be monarchists, members of the League, led by Nikolaos Zorbas, asked, among other things, for the sovereign to expel his son from the army. Officially, this was to protect the Crown Prince from the jealousies that could arise from his friendship with some soldiers but the reality was quite different: officers continued to hold the Crown Prince responsible for the 1897 defeat.

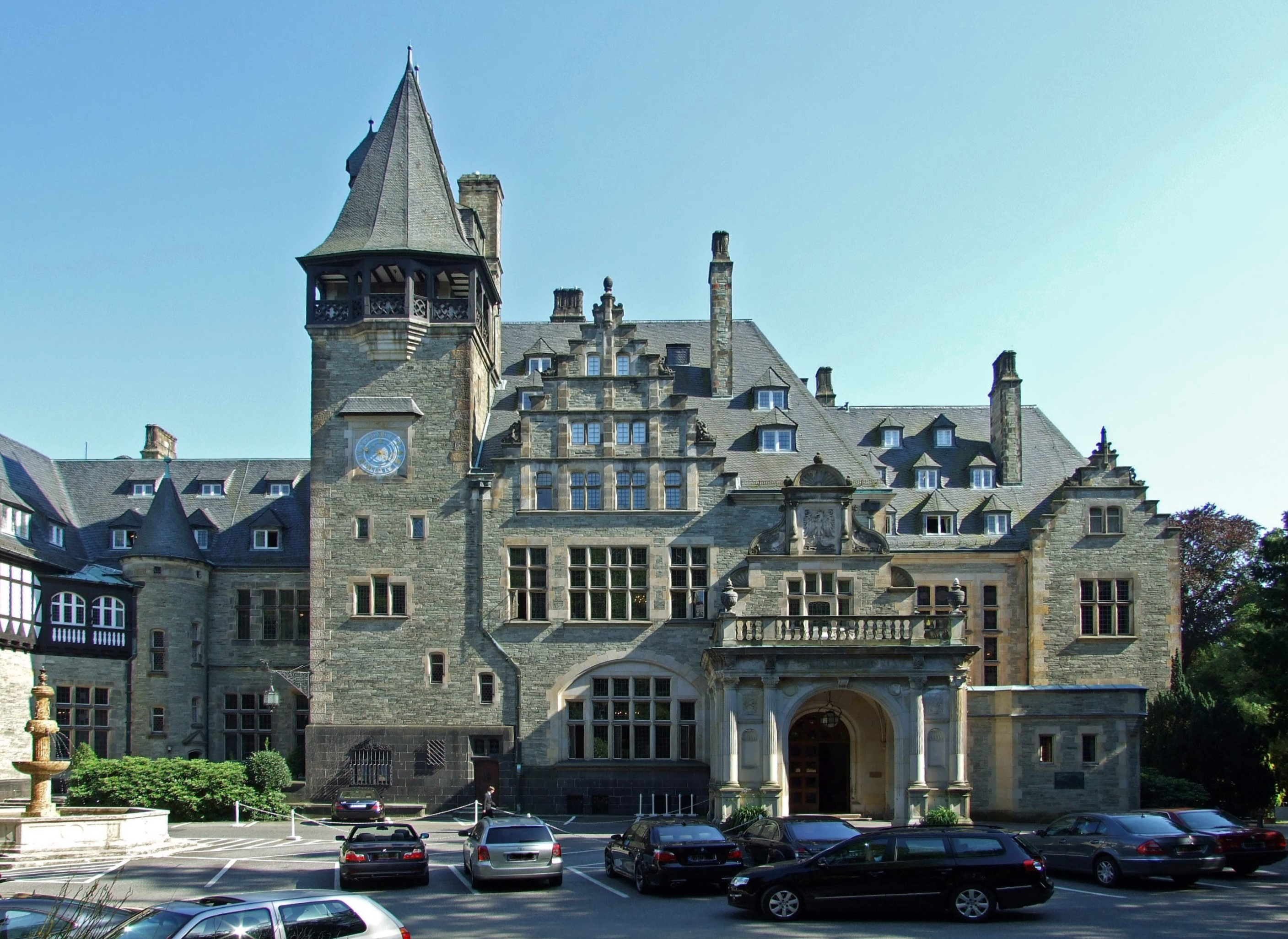
Schloss Friedrichshof, former residence of the German Dowager Empress

The situation became so tense that George I's sons had to resign from their military posts to save their father the shame of having to expelled them. In September, the Crown Prince, his wife and their children also chose to leave Greece and seek refuge in Germany at Friedrichshof, now owned by the Princess Margaret of Prussia. Meanwhile, in Athens, discussions began in some circles about dethroning the House of Glücksburg to establishing a republic or replacing the sovereign with either a bastard son of Otto I, a foreign prince or with Prince George, with Sophia as regent.

In December 1909, Colonel Zorbas, head of the Military League, pressured George I to appoint him as the head of the government in place of Prime Minister Kyriakoulis Mavromichalis. The sovereign refused but the government underwent reforms which favored the military. The staff was reorganized and supporters of the Crown Prince, including Ioannis Metaxas, were expelled. At the same time, a French army mission was called to reorganize the Greek army, which threatened both Sophia and her husband, as they helped develop republican ideas within the military.

Despite these reforms, some members of the Military League continued to oppose the government in order to take power. They then traveled to Crete to meet the prominent Cretan politician Eleftherios Venizelos, and offered him the post of Prime Minister of Greece. (Note: When Prince George of Greece, Sophia's brother-in-law, was High Commissioner of the Cretan State, between 1905 and 1909, Venizelos fiercely opposed his policy and the Cretan leader acquired a strong anti-monarchical will. The officers of the League thus saw him as a natural and effective partner against King George I.) However the Cretan leader did not want to appear in Greece to be supported by the army and convinced them to arrange for new elections. In March 1910, the king eventually called for elections and Venizelos and his supporters came to power. For the royal family, this was a difficult time.

However, Venizelos did not want to weaken the Crown. To show that he did not obey the army, he restored the members of the royal family to their military duties and the Crown Prince thus again became inspector-general of the army. Back in Greece on 21 October 1910, after over a year of exile, Sophia nevertheless remained very suspicious of the new government and the militia. She refused any contact with Venizelos, blaming him as partly responsible for the humiliation suffered by the royal family. The Princess also had problems with her father-in-law, whom she accused of having been weak during the crisis.

=== Nurse during the First Balkan War ===
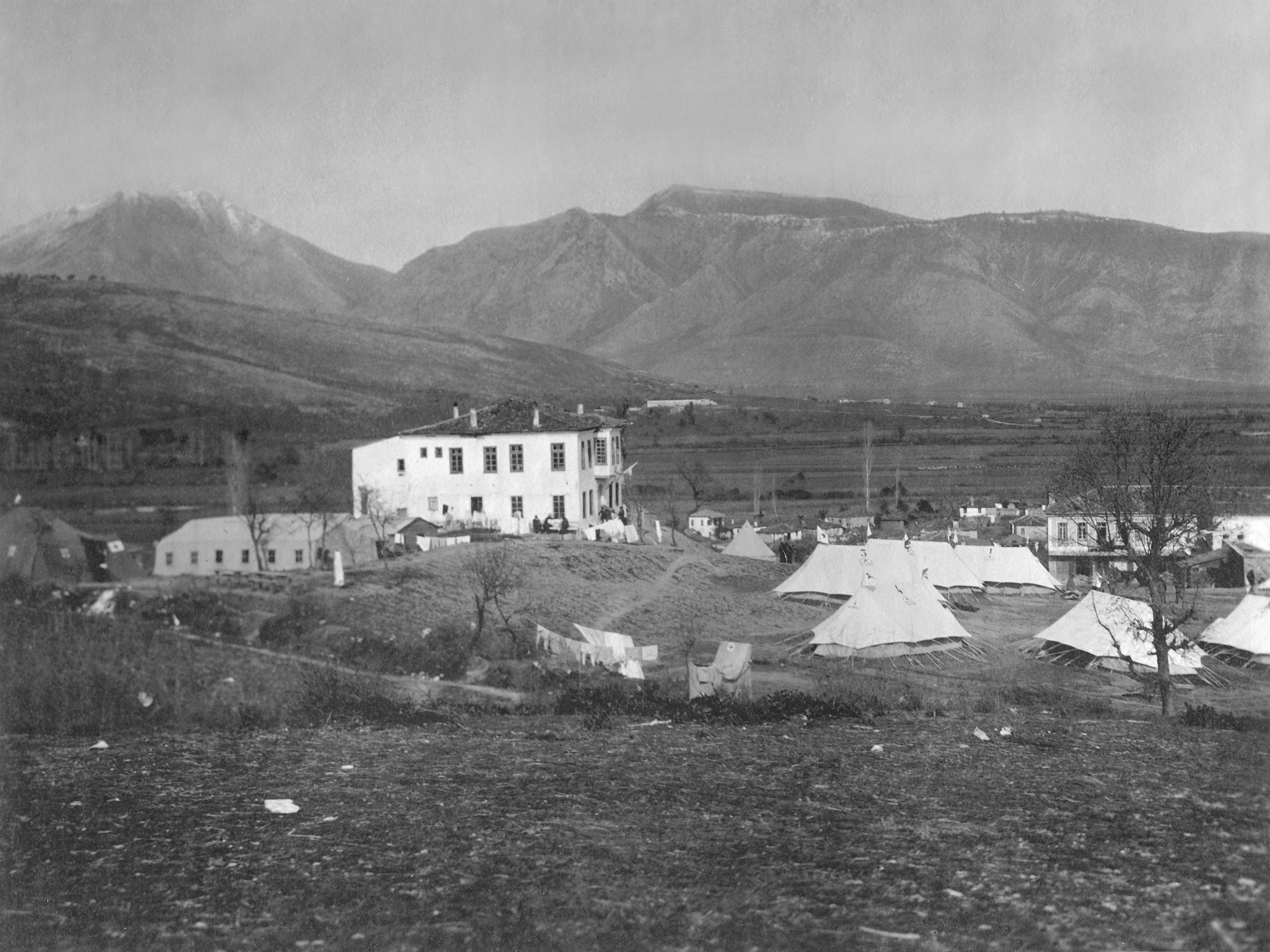
The hospital of princess Sophia, on the war-front, near Filippiada, January 1913.

After the arrival of Venizelos in power, the Greek army was modernized and equipped with the support of French and British officers. New warships were also ordered by the navy. The aim of the modernization was to make the country ready for a new war against the Ottoman Empire but to defeat the enemy and achieve the Megali Idea, Greece needed allies. That was why, under the initiative of the new Prime Minister, Greece signed alliances with its neighbors and participated in the creation of the Balkan League in June 1912. Thus, when Montenegro declared war on the Ottoman Empire on 8 October 1912, they were joined less than ten days later by Serbia, Bulgaria and Greece. This was the beginning of the First Balkan War. While the Crown Prince and his brothers took command of Greek troops, Queen Olga, Sophia, and her sisters-in-law (Marie Bonaparte, Elena Vladimirovna of Russia and Alice of Battenberg) took in charge the aid to wounded soldiers and refugees. In one month, the princesses collected 80,000 garments for the military and gathered around them doctors, nurses and medical equipment. The Queen and Crown Princess also opened a public subscription in order to create new hospitals in Athens and on the front. Very active, the princesses did not just stay in the rear areas but also went to the center of the military operations. Queen Olga and Sophia visited Larissa and Elassona, while Alice made long stays in Epirus and Macedonia. Meanwhile, Elena directed an ambulance-train and Marie Bonaparte set up a hospital ship that connected Thessaloniki to the capital.

The war was an opportunity for the princesses to prove themselves useful to their adopted country but it also exacerbated rivalries within the royal family. Conflict began due to Sophia's jealousy of her cousin (Note: Alice and Sophia were first cousins once removed in descent from Queen Victoria; Alice's mother Princess Louis of Battenberg was, like Sophia, a granddaughter of Queen Victoria (through her second daughter, also named Alice).) and sister-in-law Alice. In fact, a heated argument between the two young women erupted after Alice sent, without requesting permission from Sophia, nurses dependent on the Crown Princess to Thessaloniki. One seemingly innocuous event provoked a real discomfort within the family and Queen Olga was shocked when Sophia's attitude was supported by her husband.

=== Marital problems and private life ===
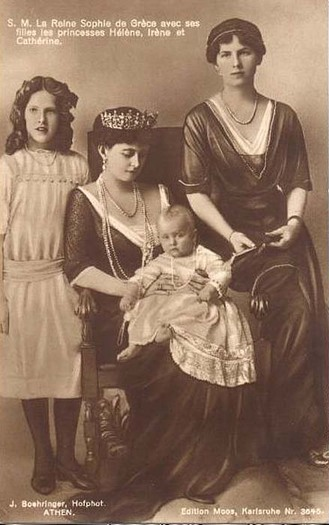
Sophia and her three daughters Helen, Irene and Katherine

Sophia and Constantine's marriage was harmonious during the first years. However, faithfulness was not the greatest quality of the Crown Prince and his wife soon had to deal with his numerous extramarital affairs. Initially shocked by his betrayal, Sophia soon followed the example of her mother-in-law and condoned the behavior of her husband. From 1912, however, the couple became noticeably separated. At that time, Constantine began an affair with Countess Paola von Ostheim (née Wanda Paola Lottero), an Italian stage actress who had recently divorced from Prince Hermann of Saxe-Weimar-Eisenach; this relationship lasted until Constantine's death.

When Sophia gave birth to her sixth and last child, a daughter named Katherine, on 4 May 1913, a persistent gossip stated that the child was the result of her own affairs. The rumors, true or false, did not affect Constantine, who easily recognized his paternity.

In private, the Crown Princely couple communicated in English and it was mainly in this language that they raised their children, who grew up in a loving and warm atmosphere in the middle of a cohort of tutors and British nannies. Like her mother, Sophia inculcated in her offspring the love for the United Kingdom and for several weeks every year, the family spent time in Great Britain, where she visited the beaches of Seaford and Eastbourne. However, the summer vacations of the family were spent not only in Friedrichshof with the Empress Dowager, but also in Corfu and Venice, where the Greek royal family went aboard the yacht Amphitrite.

== Queen of the Hellenes: 1st tenure (1913-1917) ==
=== Assassination of George I and Second Balkan War ===
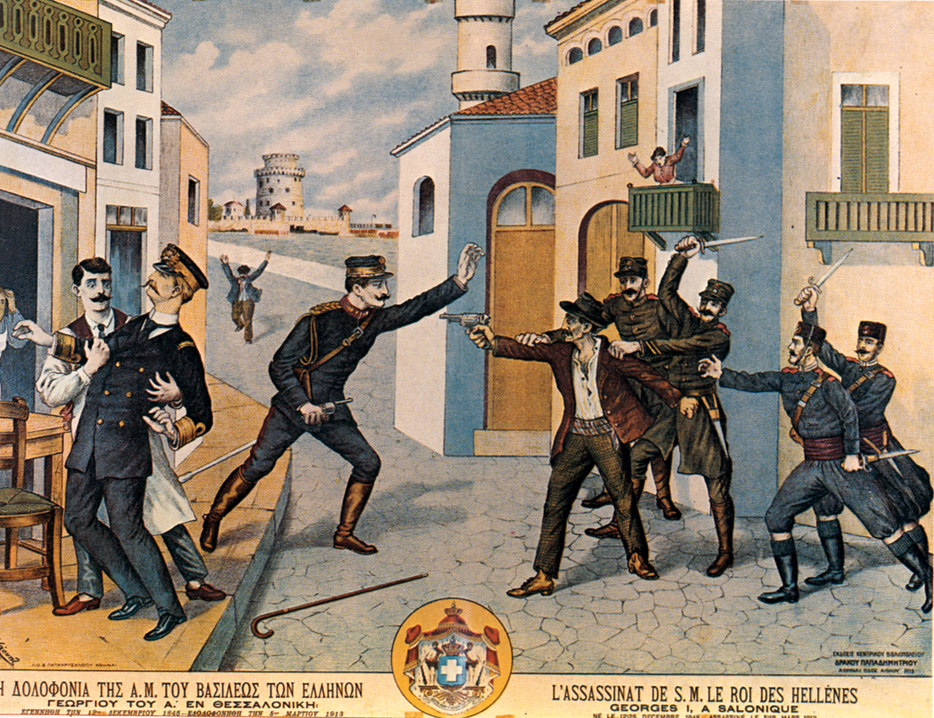
Assassination of George I by Alexandros Schinas as depicted in a contemporary lithograph

The First Balkan War ended in 1913 with the defeat of the Ottoman Empire by the Greek, Bulgarian, Serbian and Montenegrin coalition. The Kingdom of Greece was greatly expanded after the conflict but disagreements soon arose between the allied powers: Greece and Bulgaria competed for possession of Thessaloniki and its surrounding region.

To affirm the sovereignty of the Greeks over the main city of Macedonia, George I moved to the city soon after its conquest by the Crown Prince, on 8 December 1912. During his long stay in the city, the King went out every day to walk unescorted in the streets, as he had become accustomed to doing in Athens. On 18 March 1913 a Greek anarchist named Alexandros Schinas shot him in the back from a distance of two paces while he was walking in Thessaloniki near the White Tower.

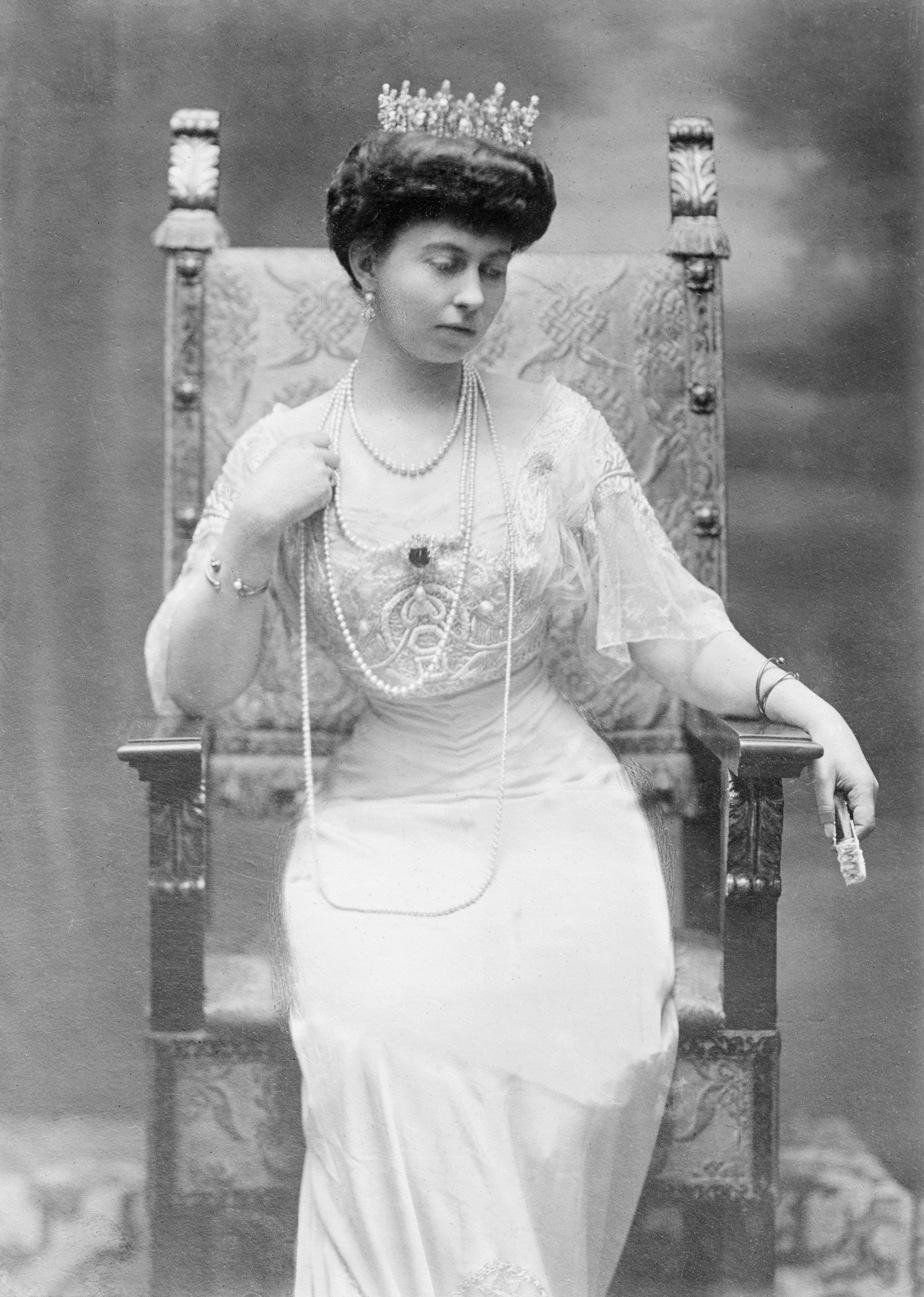
Sophia as Queen of the Hellenes, 1913.

Sophia was in Athens when she learned of the murder of her father-in-law, the king. Now, as Queen Consort of the Hellenes, the responsibility fell upon her to break the news of the murder to her mother-in-law. (Note: Hugo Vickers, in his biography of Princess Alice of Battenberg, however, says that it was Princess Alice and Princes Andrew and George of Greece who gave Queen Olga the news of her husband's murder.) Together with her eldest daughter, Princess Helen, both comforted the now Dowager Queen, who received the news stoically. The next day, members of the royal family who were present in the capital went to Thessaloniki. Arriving in the Macedonian city, they visited the scene of the murder and collected the remains of the King to escort them back to Athens, where he was buried at Tatoi.

In this difficult context, the death of George I sealed the possession of Thessaloniki to Greece. Still, the Second Balkan War broke out in June 1913 over the division of Macedonia between the former allies of the first conflict. Victorious again, Greece came out of this war considerably enlarged, with the prestige of King Constantine I and Queen Sophia also increased.

=== Private life ===
After their accession to the throne, Constantine and Sophia continued to lead the simple lifestyle that they had enjoyed during their time as heirs. They spent their free time practising botany, which was their common passion, and transformed the gardens of the New Royal Palace (Note: In 1909, a fire destroyed a large part of the Royal Palace (now used by the Hellenic Parliament), with the result that the Crown Prince's Palace was used temporarily as the residence of the royal family. However, it wasn't until the ascension of Constantine I to the throne that the Palace became the main royal residence.) on the English model.

The couple was very close to other members of the royal family, especially Prince Nicholas. Every Tuesday, the King and Queen dined with him and his wife Elena, and on Thursdays, they returned the visit with the royal couple at the Royal Palace.

=== Outbreak of World War I ===
King Constantine I and Queen Sophia with their children, ca. 1915

At the outbreak of World War I on 4 August 1914 Sophia was in England at Eastbourne with several of her children while her husband and their daughter Helen were the only representatives of the dynasty still present in Athens. However, given the gravity of events, the Queen quickly returned to Greece, where she was soon joined by the rest of the royal family.

While the greater European states entered into the conflict one by one, Greece officially proclaimed its neutrality. Being grandchildren of the so-called "Father-in-law and Grandmother of Europe" (as Christian IX of Denmark and Queen Victoria respectively were known), Constantine and Sophia were closely related to the monarchs of the Triple Alliance and the Triple Entente. (Note: King Constantine I was the first-cousin of Tsar Nicholas II of Russia and King George V of the United Kingdom. As for Sophia, she was the sister of Emperor William II of Germany and cousin of the Tsarina Alexandra Feodorovna (Alix of Hesse) and King George V.) The King and Queen were aware that Greece was already weakened by the Balkan Wars and was not ready to participate in a new conflict. However, the population did not share the opinion of the sovereigns. Prime Minister Eleftherios Venizelos, whose great diplomatic skills had been greatly acknowledged at the London Conference of 1912-1913, especially by David Lloyd George and Georges Clemenceau, knew that Greece's newly acquired dominions were in a precarious state, so Greece had to participate in the war with the Entente Cordiale in order to safeguard its winnings from the Second Balkan War. Moreover, the Ottoman Empire, Bulgaria and even Romania had aligned themselves with Germany and, if Germany won the war, it would most certainly be at Greece's expense, given that Bulgaria's and the Ottoman Empire's winnings in land would inevitably come from Greek lands acquired in 1913, since both countries, greatly angered at the loss of Macedonia, were looking to overthrow the Treaty of Bucharest. Indeed, the country was in a dire state, led by a weak Germanophile King and his manipulative Queen to destruction and civil war.

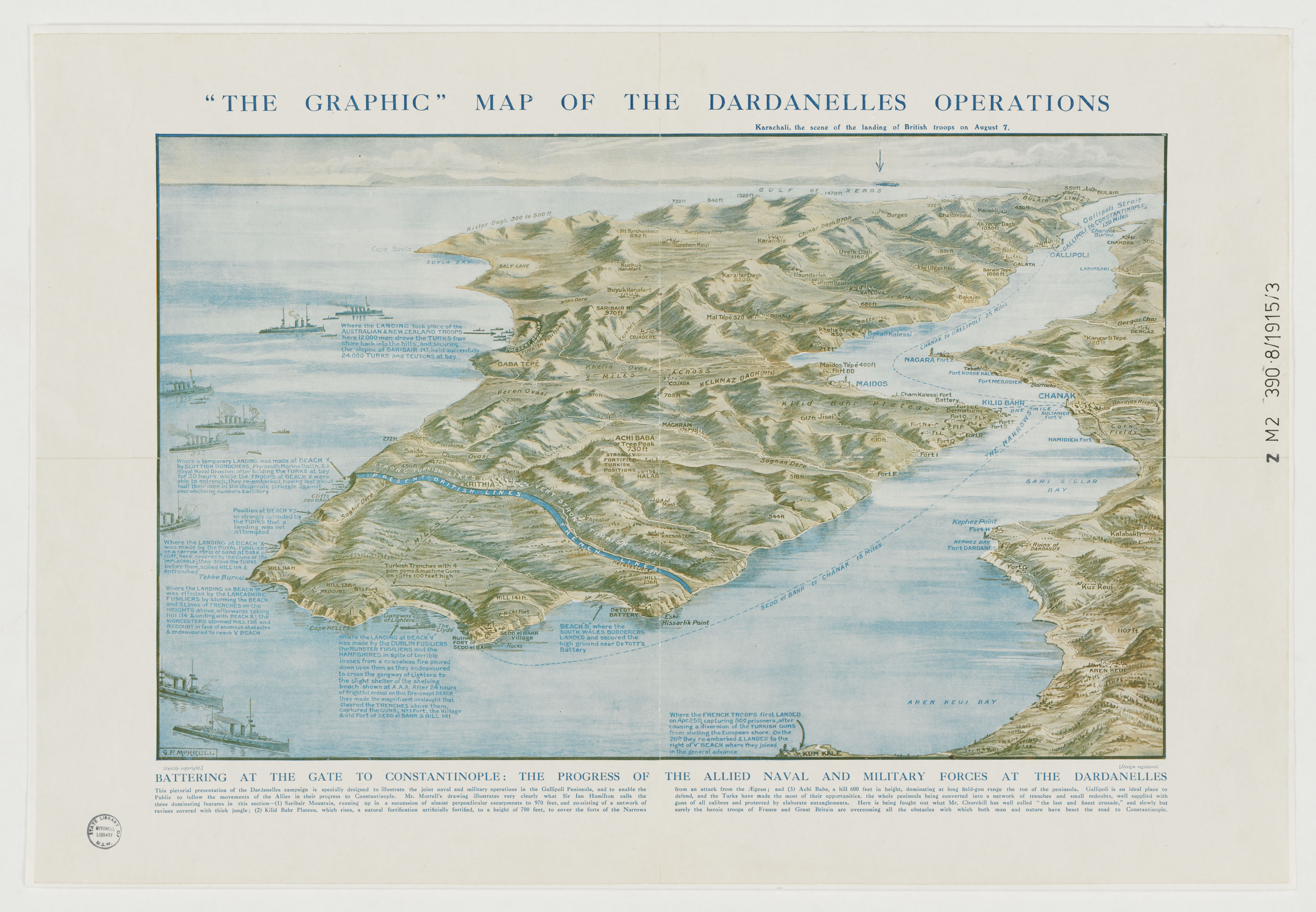
Map of the Dardanelles drawn by G.F. Morrell, 1915. The map shows the Gallipoli peninsula and west coast of Turkey, and the location of front line troops and landings.

Things got complicated when the Triple Entente engaged in the Gallipoli Campaign in February 1915. Wanting to release the Greek populations of Asia Minor from Ottoman rule, Constantine I was at first ready to offer his support to the Allies and bring his country into the war. However, the King faced the opposition of his Staff and, in particular, Ioannis Metaxas, who threatened to resign if Greece entered the war. The country did not have the means, even though the Allies offered great advantages for Greece in return for its participation. Constantine I was a great Germanophile; he had been educated in Germany, was almost raised as a German and admired immensely the Kaiser. The King had no particular desire to bring the country into war, and so he became a staunch supporter of neutrality. Constantine I therefore desisted, causing the wrath of Venizelos, who saw his country being in great peril because of the King. Because of Constantine I's actions, the Prime Minister handed over his resignation in 1915 (even after he won twice the elections held on the subject of war). A royal government then emerged. However, Venizelos was proven right on 25 May 1916, when the royal Greek government of Athens permitted the surrender of the Fort Roupel to the Germans and their Bulgarian allies as a counterbalance to the Allied forces that had been established in Thessaloniki. The German-Bulgarian troops then proceeded to occupy most of eastern Macedonia without resistance, resulting in the massacre of the Greek population there. This act led to the outbreak of a revolt of Venizelist army officers in Thessaloniki and the establishment of the Provisional Government of National Defence under Entente auspices there, opposed to the official government of Athens and Constantine I, cementing the so-called "National Schism".

Weakened by all these events, Constantine I became seriously ill after this crisis. Suffering from pleurisy aggravated by a pneumonia, he remained in bed for several weeks and nearly died. In Greece, public opinion was outraged by a rumour, spread by Venizelists, who said that the King was not sick but was in fact wounded with a knife by Sophia during an argument where she wanted to force him to go to war alongside her brother. Certainly the Queen kept a frequent communication with her brother. In the words of G. Leon, "She remained a German, and Germany's interests were placed above those of her adopted country which meant little to her. Actually she never had any sympathy for the Greek people". The Queen was also suspected to be the "power behind the throne." Various sources from the period-whose diaries, journals and extensive correspondence have been a subject of great study in Greece-note that Sophia used to hide behind a curtain in her husband's apartments during Cabinet meetings and private audiences with the King, in order to be informed on the state of affairs.

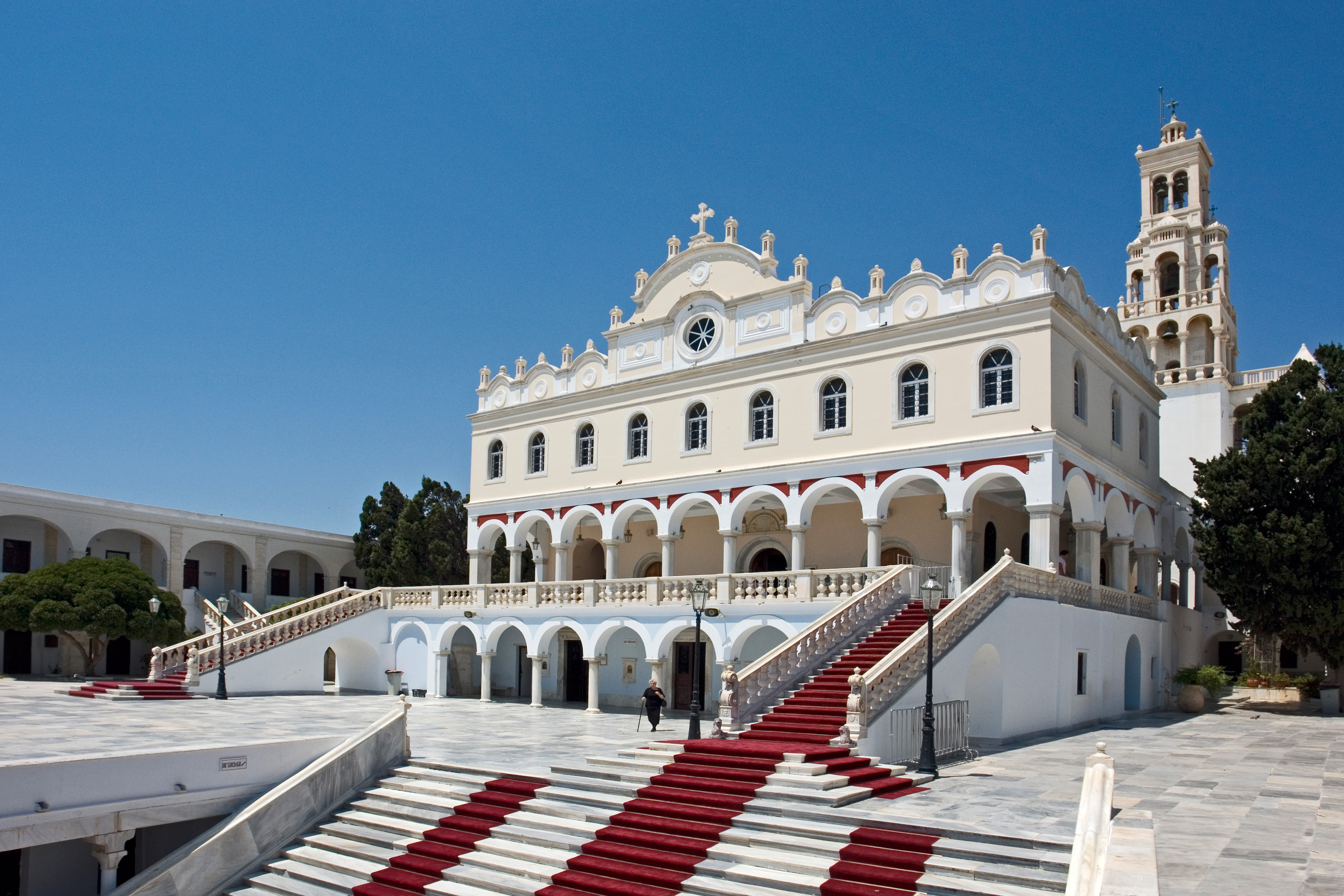
The Panaghia of Tinos

When the King's health declined a ship was sent to the Island of Tinos to seek the miraculous Icon of the Annunciation which supposedly heals the sick. While Constantine I had already received the last sacraments, he partly recovered his health after kissing the icon. However, his situation remained worrying and he needed surgery before he could resume his duties. Relieved by the recovery of her husband, Sophia offered then, by way of ex-voto, a sapphire to enrich the icon.

During the King's illness period, the Triple Entente continued to put pressure on Greece to go to war alongside them. Dimitrios Gounaris, successor of Venizelos as Prime Minister, proposed the intervention of his country in the conflict in exchange for the protection of the Allies against an eventual attack of Bulgaria. However, the Triple Entente, although eager to form an alliance with them, refused the agreement.

=== Rupture with Venizelos ===
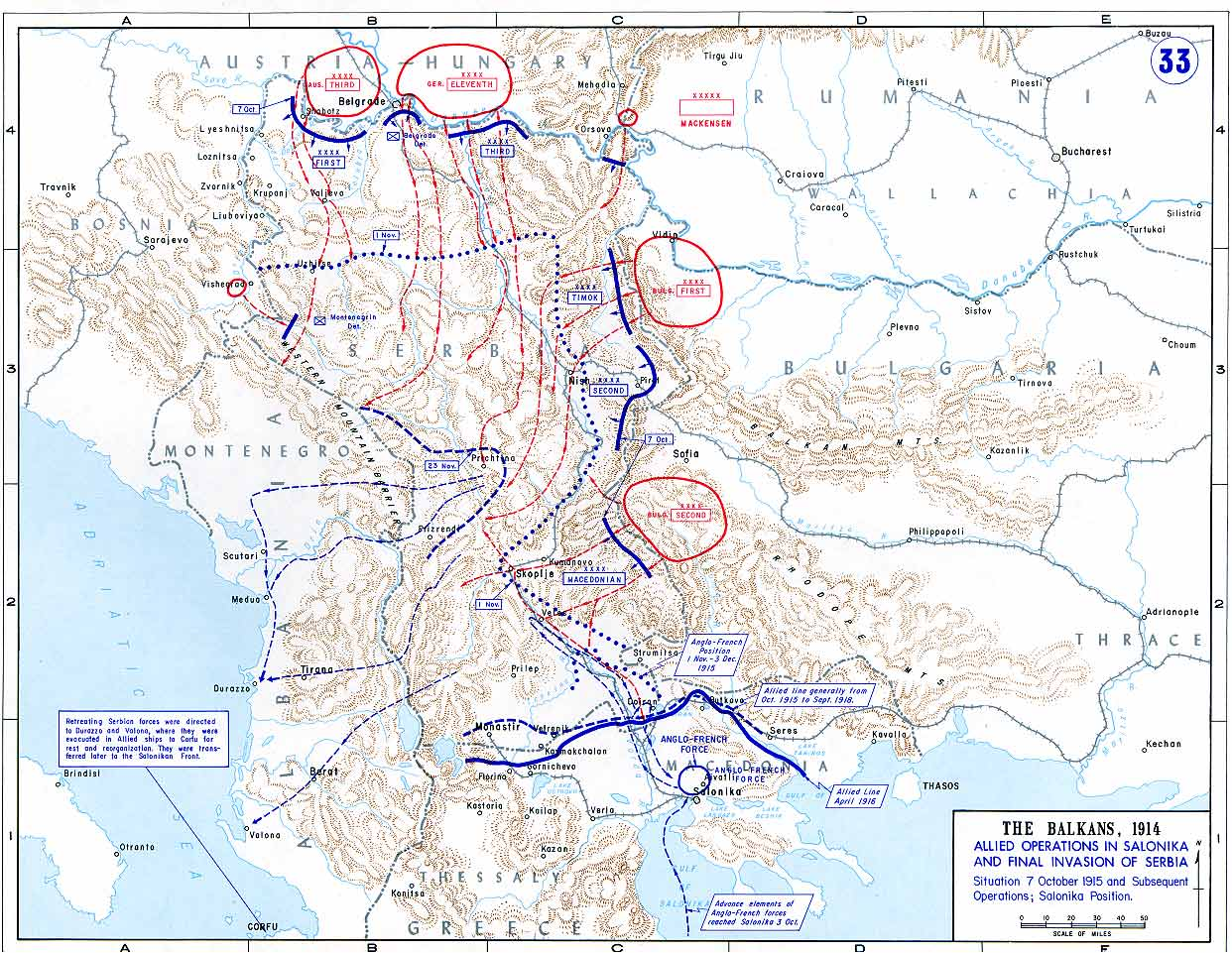
Military operations during the Serbian Campaign, 1915

In June 1915, legislative elections gave victory to the Venizelists. A month later, Constantine I, still convalescent, reassumed his official duties and eventually called on Venizelos to head the Cabinet on 16 August. In September, Bulgaria entered the war alongside the Central Powers and attacked Serbia, ally of Greece since 1913. Venizelos asked the King to proclaim a general mobilization, which he refused. However, to avoid a new political crisis, Constantine I finally proclaimed mobilization while making it clear that this was a purely defensive measure. On 3 October, in order to force the King to react, the Prime Minister called on the Allied Powers to occupy the port of Thessaloniki but Constantine I left the city when the French, Italian and British forces landed in the city. The break was now final between Venizelos and the royal family.

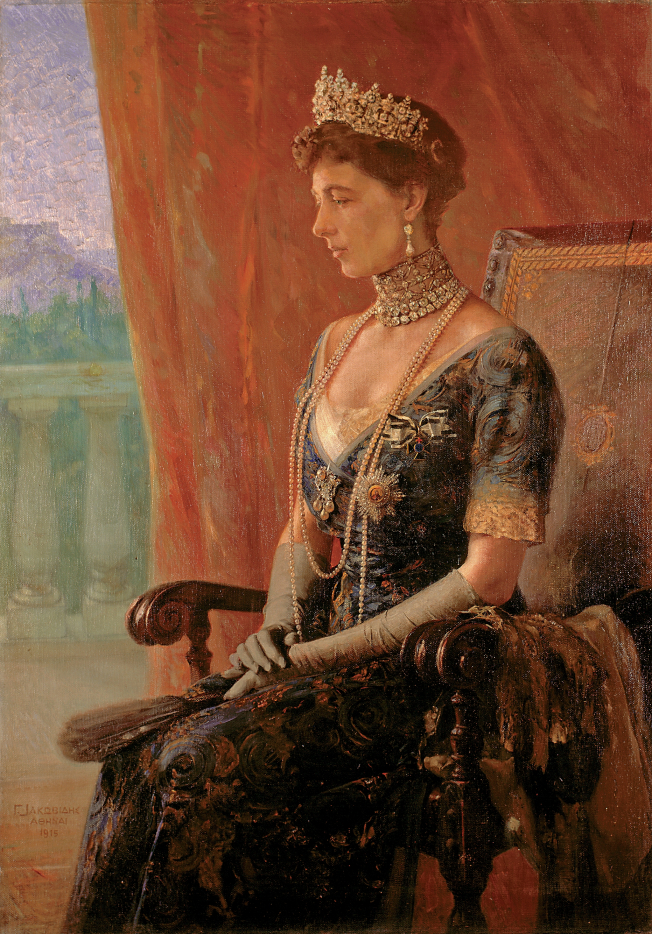
Queen Sophia, by Georgios Jakobides, 1915

As for the Allied governments, the attitude of Constantine and Sophia appeared as a betrayal and they appeared as such in the newspapers of the Triple Entente. (Note: It's said that since their marriage, Constantine and Sophia are regarded as toys of German politics by the French government.) The French press accused the Queen of regularly visiting the beaches of Phalerum in order to supply German submarines with fuel.

It must be said that by refusing to go to war, Greece prevented the Franco-British troops of helping Serbia, whose armies soon found themselves overwhelmed by the Austro-Bulgarian coalition, and it made even more uncertain an Allied victory in the Dardanelles. In retaliation, the Triple Entente ordered Greece to demobilize its army while martial law was proclaimed in Thessaloniki and a blockade was imposed on the Greeks.

The conflict between the King and Venizelos culminated in the so-called National Schism, which was essentially a battle between those who wanted things to remain as they were and those who favoured reform; between conservatism and cosmopolitanism; between the old world and the new.

The withdrawal of British troops from the Dardanelles in December 1915 reinforced the confidence of a part of the "Old Greece" (meaning the conservative parts of the country, namely around Attica and Peloponnese that constituted the original Greek state in 1830). Inhabitants of those areas saw with suspicion and resentment the enlargement of the Greek state with new lands. This "New Greece" was composed of a more cosmopolitan and broadly educated populace, while "Old Greece" was essentially a poorer, debt-ridden area, still largely relying on agriculture. In the eyes of those in "Old Greece," the Greeks living in the new lands were strangers, almost foreigners. Thus, "Old Greece" xenophobia was exploited by the King and the church for propaganda purposes in order to get rid of the liberal government of Venizelos. In 1915 the Prime Minister handed over his resignation in protest over the King's inaction regarding general mobilisation. However, a by-election followed in the first half of 1915, from which Venizelos again emerged victorious, having the support of "new Greece" (namely the lands awarded to Greece by the Treaty of Bucharest) and of the more liberal, affluent and well-educated elements of "Old Greece" society. However, that was not what the King wanted and he moved to have the Prime Minister overthrown, even if his actions meant defying the Constitution. Venizelos was again forced to resign (twice in 1915). In protest, Venizelos and his supporters refused to participate in the poll and declared that the newly elected Greek parliament was illegal. A new government, loyal to the King, emerged.

=== Assassination attempts ===
From that point on, the Greek government followed a policy more favorable to the Triple Alliance. The population protested against the transfer of the Serbian army to Corfu and then to Thessaloniki. Orders were given that officers at the borders must not oppose a Bulgarian advance into the country, which took place on 27 May 1916. Finally, in April 1916, Constantine I symbolically proclaimed the annexation of Northern Epirus to Greece in response to the Italian intervention into Albania.

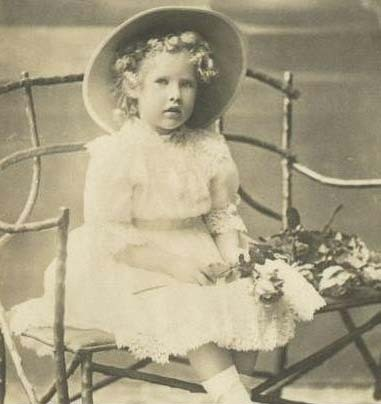
Princess Katherine, ca. 1917

Now considered enemies of the Triple Entente, the royal couple faced increasingly violent opposition. (Note: During a visit of Prince Andrew of Greece to the Permanent Sub-Secretary at the Foreign Office, the latter said coldly: "What can we expect [from Greece] as your Queen is the sister of the Emperor?".) The French developed various plots to kidnap or assassinate of the sovereigns. On 14 July 1916, a mysterious fire (probably a deliberate act of arson set by agents of Paris) broke out in the forest surrounding Tatoi. In the confusion, Sophia saved her youngest daughter, Princess Katherine, and ran over 2 km into the woods with the child in her arms. Several members of the royal family, including Constantine I himself, were wounded and the residence of the rulers was largely destroyed by the fire, which lasted 48 hours. Above all, 16 (or 18, depending on sources) soldiers and other members of the palace staff were killed.

After these events, the attitude of the royal family in regard to Germany changed considerably. Between December 1916 and February 1917, the Queen, who had been less of a Germanophile than her husband, sent several telegrams to her brother, asking him when the troops of the Centrals would be able to intervene in Macedonia. However, Sophia still had some resentment against the Emperor because of his anger at the time of her marriage and her conversion to Orthodoxy; but the violation of Greece's neutrality by the Triple Entente and the threats against the life of her husband and children gradually changed her views against the Allies.

=== National Schism and pressures of the Triple Entente ===
In October 1916, Eleftherios Venizelos set up in Thessaloniki, where he organized a provisional government against the one led by Spyridon Lambros in Athens. This was the beginning of the so-called National Schism. (Greek: Εθνικός Διχασμός, Ethnikos Dikhasmos). Meanwhile, a Franco-British fleet commanded by Vice Admiral Louis Dartige du Fournet, occupied the bay of Salamis to put pressure on Athens, while various ultimatums were sent, mainly concerning the disarmament of his army. With the blockade, the supply of the capital was increasingly difficult and famine began. Sophia redoubled her efforts to help the poor. With the Patriotic League of Greek Women, she managed to distribute 10,000 meals a day, as well as clothing, blankets, medicines and milk for children. Still, the situation became even more difficult.

On 1 December 1916, Constantine I finally agreed to the French demands, and soldiers of the Triple Entente landed in Athens to seize guns promised by the sovereign two months earlier. But secretly a group of Greek reservists mobilized and fortified Athens. The French were met by heavy fire and many were killed; the event was called by the local press of the time as the "Greek Vespers". After this, the king congratulated both the Minister of War and General Dousmanis.

The Triple Entente quickly reacted to this attack. The French fleet bombarded the royal palace in Athens, forcing Sophia and her children to take refuge in the castle cellars for several hours. Above all, the government of Aristide Briand offered to depose Constantine I and replaced him by his younger brother, Prince George.

However, Russia and Italy refused to intervene because of fears of Greek claims on Asia Minor and the blood ties between Constantine I and Tsar Nicholas II.

=== First exile ===
==== Dethronement and family separation ====
With the Russian Revolution of 1917 and the deposition of Nicholas II, Constantine and Sophia lost the last of their supporters in the Triple Entente. Thus, on 10 June 1917 Charles Jonnart, the Allied High Commissioner, asked the Greek Government for the abdication of the King and his replacement by another prince. The Diadochos George was also considered a pro-German. Under the threat of an invasion of 10,000 troops in Piraeus, Constantine I relinquished power in favor of his second son, Prince Alexander. Nevertheless, Constantine refused to abdicate. He explained that Alexander should be considered a kind of regent in charge of the throne until the return of the legitimate monarch.

On 11 June, the royal family secretly left the Royal Palace, surrounded by a group of loyalists, and arrived at Tatoi. The next day, Constantine, Sophia and five of their children left Greece from the port of Oropos, taking the road to exile. This was the last time Sophia saw her second son, now proclaimed king as Alexander I. Venizelists prohibited any contact between the new sovereign and the rest of the royal family.

==== Life in Switzerland ====
After crossing the Ionian Sea and Italy, Sophia and her family settled in Switzerland, mainly between the cities of St. Moritz, Zürich and Lucerne. In exile, the rulers were soon followed by almost all the members of the royal family who left Greece on the return of Venizelos as head of the government and as Greece entered the war at the side of the Triple Entente. In addition, the financial position of the royal family was precarious and Constantine I, haunted by a deep sense of failure, soon fell ill. In 1918, he contracted Spanish flu and was again close to death.

Already concerned about the health of her husband, Sophia was devastated by the prohibition against contact with her second son. In fact, in Athens, Alexander I was entirely cut off from his family and the government formally prevented him from communicating with his parents. Even during a short stay in Paris in May 1920, guards closely monitored Constantine's activity. When Sophia telephoned him at his hotel, a man coldly answered stating "His Majesty is sorry but he can't answer the phone".

With the end of World War I and the signing of the Treaties of Neuilly and Sèvres, the Kingdom of Greece achieved significant territorial gains in Thrace and Anatolia. However, the country remained unstable and tensions between Venizelos and the exiled royals continued. The decision of Alexander I to marry Aspasia Manos rather than a European princess displeased both the Head of the government and the King's parents. Very attached to social conventions, Sophia condemned what she saw as a mésalliance while the Prime Minister saw in this marriage a lost opportunity to get closer to Great Britain.

==== Death of Alexander I ====
On 2 October 1920, King Alexander I was bitten by a pet monkey as he walked on the royal estate of Tatoi. His wounds quickly became infected and he suffered from a high fever and sepsis. On 19 October, he became delirious and called out for his mother to come to his bedside. However, the Greek government refused to allow Sophia to return to Greece; they feared that the loyalists would benefit from the presence of the Queen in Athens to organize action against them.

Sophia begged the government to allow her entry in the country for what would likely be a last visit with her son. Aware that only her mother-in-law still found favor with Venizelists, she eventually asked Dowager Queen Olga to go to Athens to take care of Alexander. After several days of negotiations, Olga obtained permission to return to Greece. But she was delayed by rough seas and arrived 12 hours after the death of her grandson, on 25 October.

Two days later, the remains of the young King were buried in the royal crypt of Tatoi. Again, the government banned the exiled royals from entering the country and the Dowager Queen was the only member of the family to attend the funeral. The loss of her son and the impossibility to go to his funeral deeply affected Sophia. Many observers noticed the sadness that perpetually showed on the Queen's face after this loss.

==== Fall of Venizelos and Olga's regency ====
In Athens, the death of Alexander I created a serious institutional crisis. Always opposed to the return of Constantine I and 'Diadochos George' to Greece, the government of Eleftherios Venizelos offered the throne to Prince Paul, the third son of the deposed sovereign. However, he refused to ascend the throne before his father and his elder brother unless a referendum appointed him as the new Head of State.

The situation of the Venizelists was already precarious after the difficulties faced by the country during the Greco-Turkish War of 1919-1922. Supporters of King Constantine I therefore experienced a resurgence of popularity and Venizelos was defeated in the parliamentary elections of November 1920. The return of monarchists to power led to the resignation of Venizelist administrative staff and on 17 November Admiral Pavlos Kountouriotis was appointed regent after the death of Alexander I, chose to resign. The new Prime Minister Dimitrios Rallis, therefore asked Dowager Queen Olga to assume the regency until the return of her son, on 19 December 1920. For about a month, she was the head of the Greek kingdom but her role was roughly limited to preparing for the restoration of Constantine I.

In the meantime, in Switzerland, the royal family was preparing for the wedding of two of their children with children of King Ferdinand I of Romania. A few weeks before the death of Alexander I, 'Diadochos George' became engaged to Princess Elisabeth of Romania, while Princess Helen of Greece had secretly been engaged to Crown Prince Carol of Romania since 1913. Sophia was satisfied with her son's upcoming wedding, but she disapproved of her daughter's romance with the Romanian Crown Prince. Still saddened by the death of Alexander, the Queen did not want to lose another child. Sophia had no confidence in the future Carol II, whose marriage and divorce from Zizi Lambrino had already shocked her.

== Queen of the Hellenes: 2nd tenure (1920-1922) ==
=== Return to Greece ===
The return of Constantine I and Sophia to Athens on 19 December 1920, was accompanied by large demonstrations of joy. Everywhere in the streets, portraits of Venizelos were pulled and replaced by those of the royal family. A huge crowd surrounded the royal couple in the streets of the capital and, after returning to the Royal Palace, they had to appear repeatedly on the balcony to greet the people who cheered them.

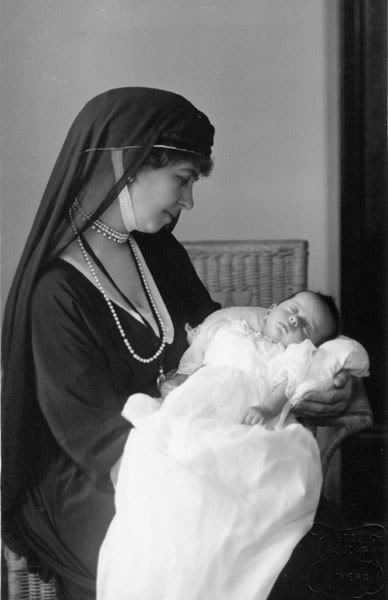
Princess Alexandra in the arms of her grandmother Queen Sophia, April 1921

However, the presence of the sovereigns in Greece did not bring the expected peace. In fact, the former allies did not forgive the King and Queen's attitude during World War I and they were not ready to provide their support. The antipathy of the great powers toward Constantine I and Sophia was evident on the occasion of the marriage, in Athens, of Princess Helen and Crown Prince Carol of Romania. Present at the wedding, the ambassador of Great Britain and his wife pointedly refused to salute the Greek King and Queen while clearly showing such respect to Queen Marie of Romania. For Sophia, the snub was more difficult to bear because she had always been on good terms with the United Kingdom representatives before the deposition of Constantine I and she continued to nurture loving feelings for the country of her mother.

The main source of joy for Sophia after her return to Greece was the birth of her granddaughter Alexandra, on 25 March 1921. Although initially opposed to Alexander's marriage with Aspasia Manos, the Queen welcomed their daughter with delight and pressed both her husband and eldest son to give her granddaughter the status and titles reserved to members of the royal family.

=== Great Disaster ===
After initial success, the situation of the Greek army was increasingly precarious in Anatolia. Constantine I decided to travel there in May 1921 to support the morale; however he wasn't the dynamic Commander-in-chief that led his country to victory in the Balkan Wars of 1912–1913. Seriously diminished by illness, he had to return to Greece in September, which was perceived as a real military desertion by some. As for Sophia, she could do more than support her husband and reassume her nursing work with wounded soldiers.

The Greco-Turkish War continued until the Greek defeat of Sakarya in August–September 1921, and the siege and burning of Smyrna (now İzmir) by the Turks in September 1922. After these events, the country plunged into a deep political and moral crisis. While Mustafa Kemal and his armies gradually reconquered Anatolia and east Thrace, thousands of Greeks were murdered and others fled from Asia Minor to find refuge in Greece. This was called the "Great Disaster", which was definitive a few months later with the signing of the Treaty of Lausanne (24 July 1923).

=== Abdication of Constantine I ===
In response to the military defeat by the Turks, a part of the Greek army, commanded by General Nikolaos Plastiras, revolted on 11 September 1922 (on the Julian calendar, 24 September on the Gregorian calendar in use in the rest of the world). They demanded the abdication of Constantine I and the dissolution of the Hellenic Parliament. Having consulted his friend, General Ioannis Metaxas, the King abdicated three days later on 27 September in favor of his eldest son, who succeeded him on the throne under the name of George II.

== Dowager Queen (1922-1932) ==
=== Second exile and concerns for Greece ===
To ensure their security and stabilize the throne of their son, Constantine I and Sophia once again chose to take the path of exile. On 30 October 1922 the deposed royal couple, Princesses Irene and Katherine and Prince Nicholas with his family, went again to the port of Oropos to leave their country but, contrary to what happened in 1917, few followers awaited them this time before their departure into exile.

On board the Greek steamboat SS Patris, the royal family arrived in Sicily and moved to the Villa Hygeia in Palermo. The Greek political situation remained a source of concern for the exiles. In fact, in Athens, the called Trial of the Six led to the execution for high treason of former Prime Ministers Petros Protopapadakis, Nikolaos Stratos and Dimitrios Gounaris and Generals Georgios Baltatzis, Nikolaos Theotokis and Georgios Hatzianestis, all accused of responsibility for the defeat against Turkey. Above all, the life of Prince Andrew, brother of Constantine I, was also threatened in November–December 1922 and only the intervention from foreign governments commuted his sentence from death to exile.

=== Death of Constantine I and deposition of George II ===
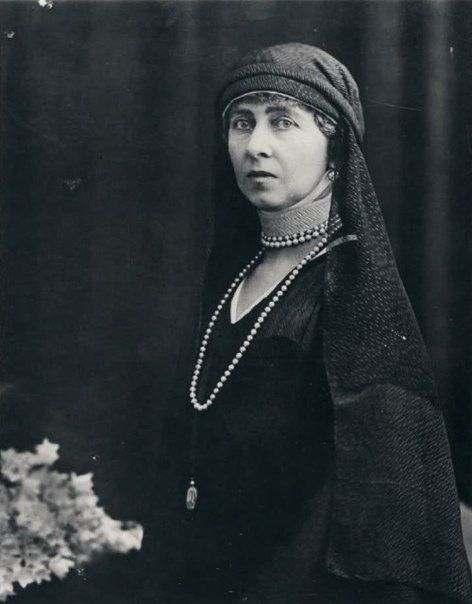
c.1923.

Increasingly depressed by the events that had shaken Greece and sick with arteriosclerosis, Constantine I developed a deep depression. He then remained sometimes hours without speaking, staring into space. Faced with this situation, Sophia's anxiety (already bigger by the fate of George II and other members of the royal family who remained in Greece), only increased. The Queen and her husband therefore made the decision to leave Sicily and settled in Florence. However, Constantine I died of a brain hemorrhage shortly before their departure, on 11 January 1923, and Sophia found herself even more isolated than she was previously.

After the death of her husband, Sophia wanted to repatriate his remains to be buried in Tatoi but the Greek government refused, with George II being unable to do anything. (Note: The King's remains were buried in the crypt of the Russian Church of Naples, before being transferred to the Russian Church in Florence until he was finally buried at Tatoi in 1936.) In fact, the situation of the new King was increasingly precarious and at the end, he himself went into exile in Romania a few months after the death of his father, on 19 December 1923. The republic was then proclaimed in Greece on 25 March 1924 and Sophia and the other members of the royal family were stripped of their Hellenic nationality. However, the Greek royals had maintained their Danish titles since George I ascended to the Greek throne in 1863 and they almost immediately received Danish passports.

=== Last years ===
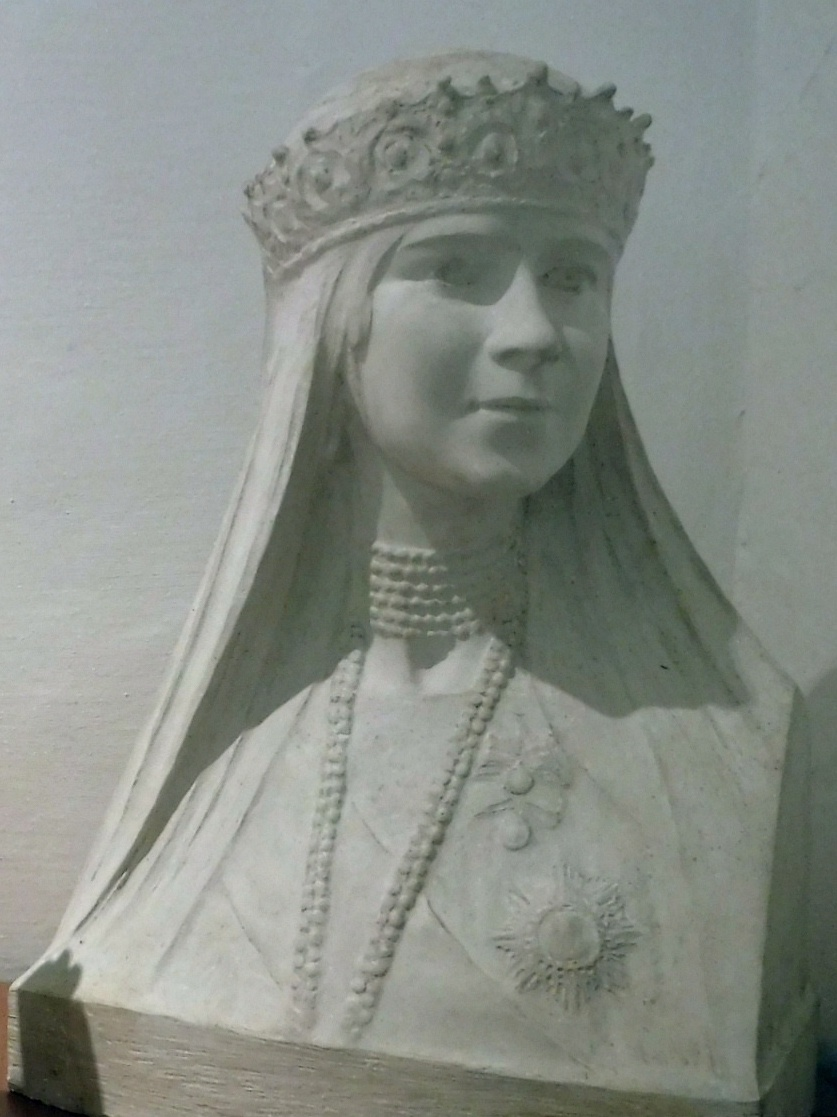
Bust of Queen Sophia by Maltese sculptor Antonio Sciortino, 1936

Sophia, now Dowager Queen, left Southern Italy with her daughters Irene and Katherine and moved to Tuscany, in the Villa Bobolina (Note: When Sophia died, this villa of the 15th century was bought by her eldest daughter Helen, Queen Mother of Romania, who renamed it Villa Sparta. That is why several sources give that name to the residence.) of Fiesole. From 1924 to 1927, the three women were joined by Princesses Aspasia and Alexandra, much to Sophia's delight, because she was very attached to her granddaughter. In 1930, Princess Helen also came to live with her mother after her disastrous marriage with King Carol II of Romania ended in divorce. During summer vacations, the Dowager Queen had the opportunity to see her grandson Prince Michael of Romania, when he came to visit his mother.

Surrounded by her family, Sophia found some stability but, convinced that Greece would not remain a republic forever, refused to acquire the villa where she settled. Released from any official position, she had now more freedom to travel. She made frequent trips to Germany, where she reunited with her sister Margaret, but also to Great Britain, after having obtained the permission of King George V. The Dowager Queen also witnessed several strong moments in the life of the European elite. In 1929, she went to Doorn in the Netherlands for the 70th birthday of her brother, the former Emperor William II, whom she had not seen since 1914.

In her older years, Sophie became increasingly religious. She remained orthodox, but also attended Anglican offices when she had the chance. The Queen Dowager was also interested in the Protestant literature, especially in the works of the Episcopalian pastor Samuel Shoemaker (particularly Religion That Works and Twice Born Ministers) and the Presbyterian Rev. James Reid (In Touch With Christ). Finally, she had a close correspondence with the Anglican pastor R. W. Cole, whom she met in Birchington, and spent long hours praying.

=== Illness, death and burial ===
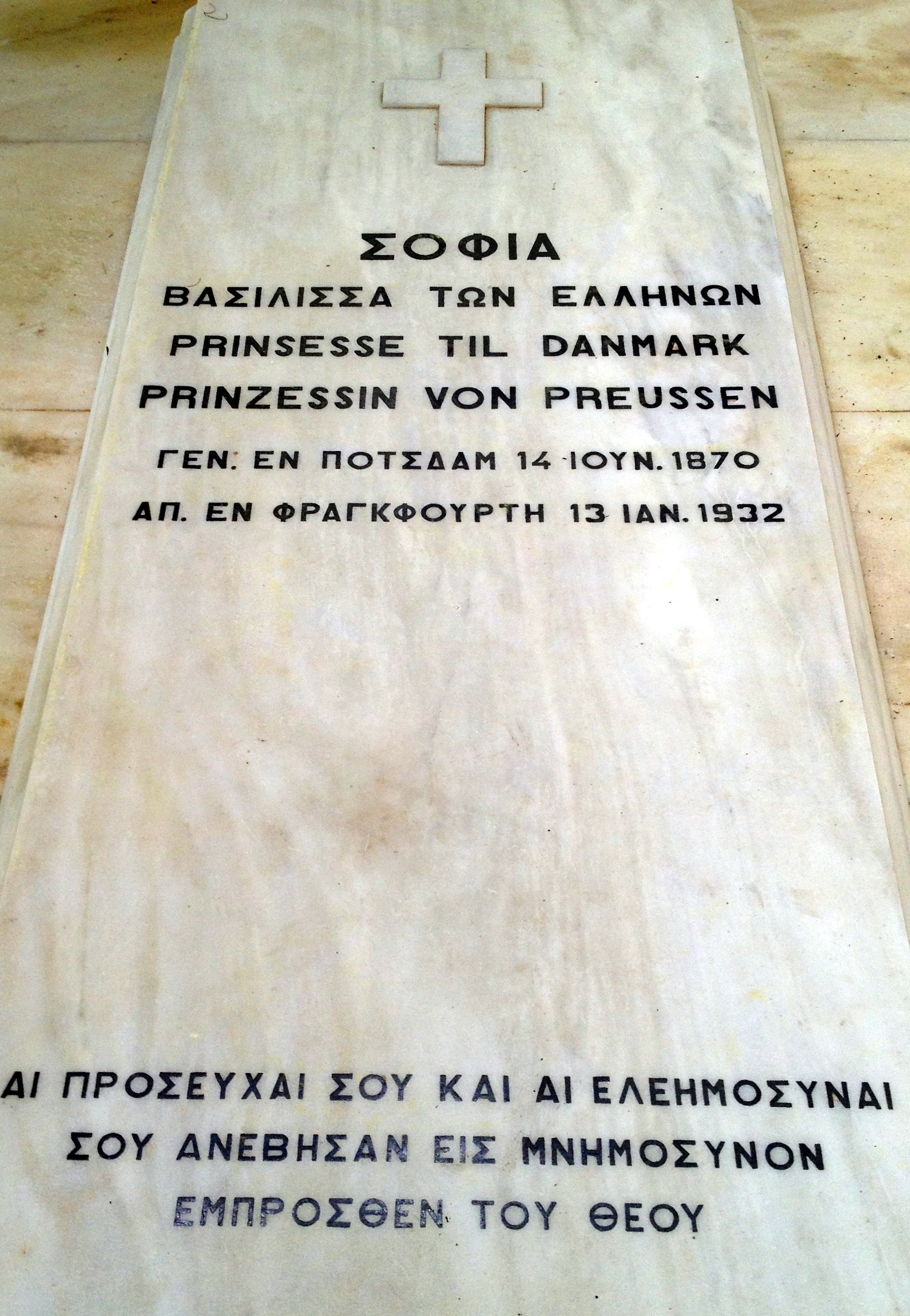
Tomb of Queen Sophia of Greece at Tatoi

Sick for many years, Sophia saw her condition worsen from 1930, which forced her to go to a hospital in Frankfurt to follow a treatment. Apparently recovered by December, she took full advantage of her strength and during 1931 she traveled to Great Britain, Bavaria and Venice. But in September, her condition deteriorated again and she had to return to Frankfurt, where she underwent surgery. It was during this time that the doctors diagnosed advanced cancer and they gave the Dowager Queen a few weeks to live. After the New Year celebrations of 1932, Sophia gradually stopped eating and her health declined rapidly. She finally died surrounded by her children in the hospital, on 13 January 1932.

Sophia's body was transferred to the castle of Friedrichshof, where she rested a few days before being sent to the Russian Church in Florence, where she was buried alongside her husband and mother-in-law. They stayed there for four years until the restoration of George II on the Greek throne in 1935.

After his restoration on the Greek throne, George II organized the repatriation of the remains of members of his family who died in exile. An important religious ceremony that brought together, for six days in November 1936, all members of the royal family still alive. Sophia's body was buried at the royal burial ground at Tatoi Palace, where she still rests today.

Coat of Arms of Sophia of Prussia

== Archives ==
Sophia's letters to her sister Margaret are preserved in the Archive of the House of Hesse, which is kept in Fasanerie Palace in Eichenzell, Germany.

== In popular culture ==
=== Literature ===
- In The Athenians, the British journalist and writer Beverley Nichols tells the story of a young Englishwoman charged by the Secret Intelligence Service to assassinate King Constantine I during World War I. However, this spy novel, inspired by the survey conducted by the author in Greece after the restoration of the sovereign, was never released because Nichols' publishing house deemed it too compromising. The work, which was dedicated to Queen Sophia, only exists today in the form of manuscript.

=== Film and television ===
- The role of Sophia is played by actress Olga Karlatos in the Greek film Eleftherios Venizelos of Pantelis Voulgaris (1980).
- Sophia was also portrayed by Greek actress Antigoni Amanitou in the American mini-series of two episodes The First Olympics: Athens 1896, directed by Alvin Rakoff (1984).
- Sophia was portrayed by English actress Sophie Trott in the British film Victoria & Abdul (2017).

=== Phaleristics ===
- In 1936, the Order of Saints Olga and Sophia (Greek: Βασιλικό Οικογενειακό Τάγμα των Αγίων Όλγας και Σοφίας / Basilikon oikogeneiakon tagma ton agion Olgas kai Sophias) was established by King George II of Greece in the memory of his grandmother and mother.

=== Name of Avenue ===
- In Athens, the Vasilissis Sofias Avenue (Greek: Λεωφόρος Βασιλίσσης Σοφίας) was named after Queen Sophia. This major artery, which begins at the intersection of Vasilissis Amalias Avenue and Panepistimiou Street and ends in the Alexandras, Kifisias and Mesogeion Avenues, had some of the major monuments of the Greek capital: the Old Royal Palace, the National Garden of Athens, the Byzantine and Christian Museum and the War Museum.

== Issue ==
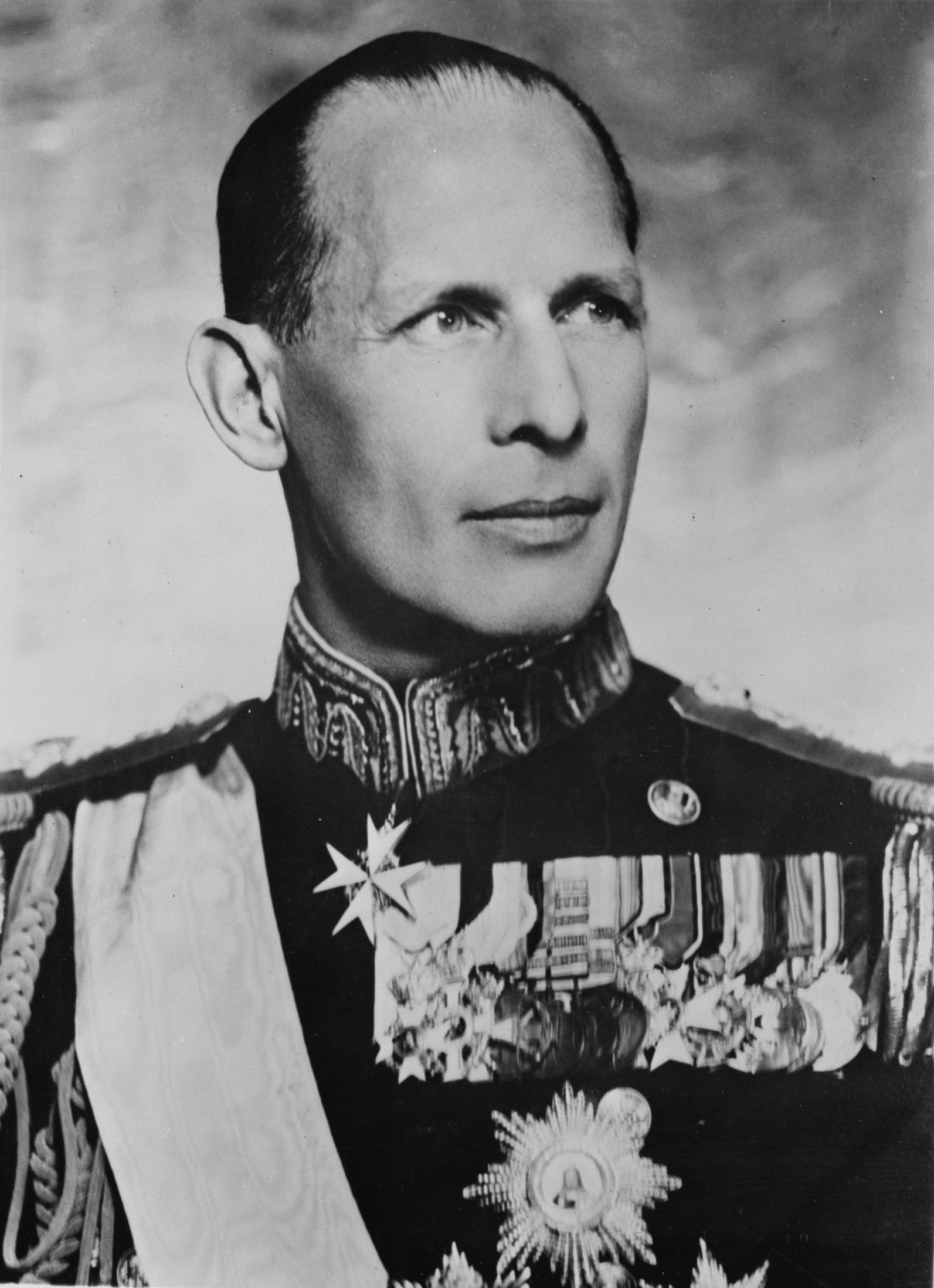
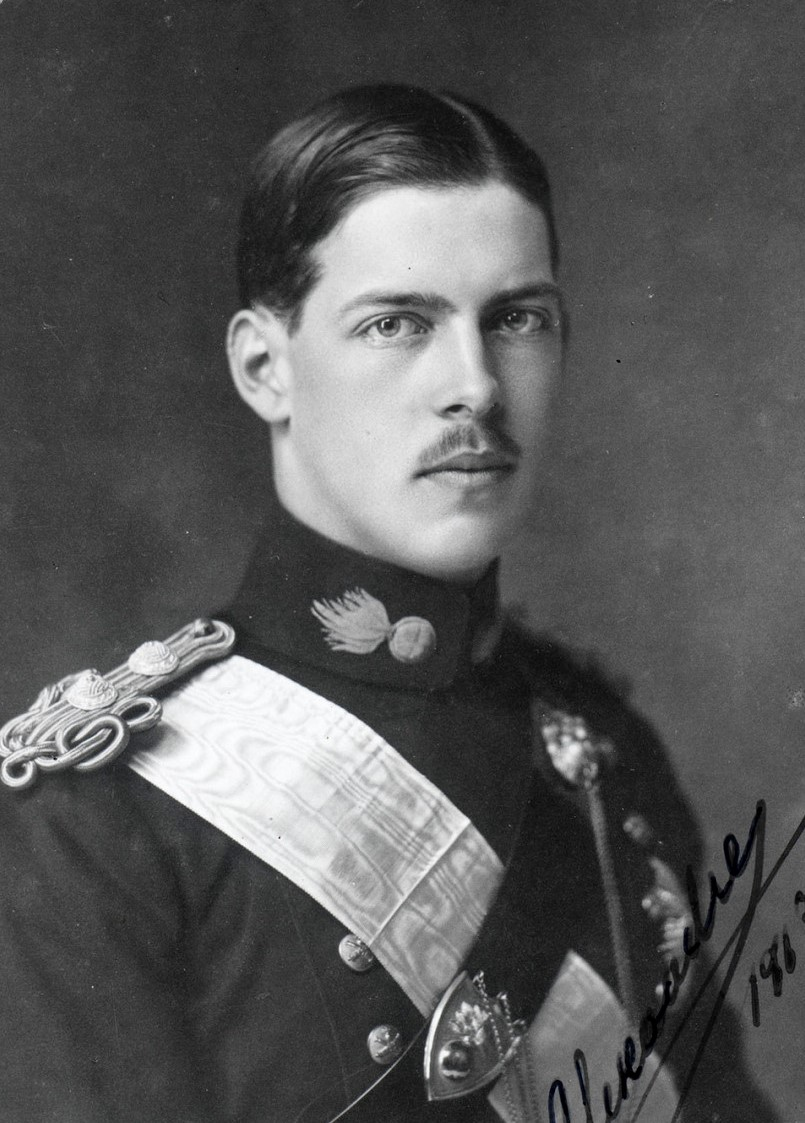
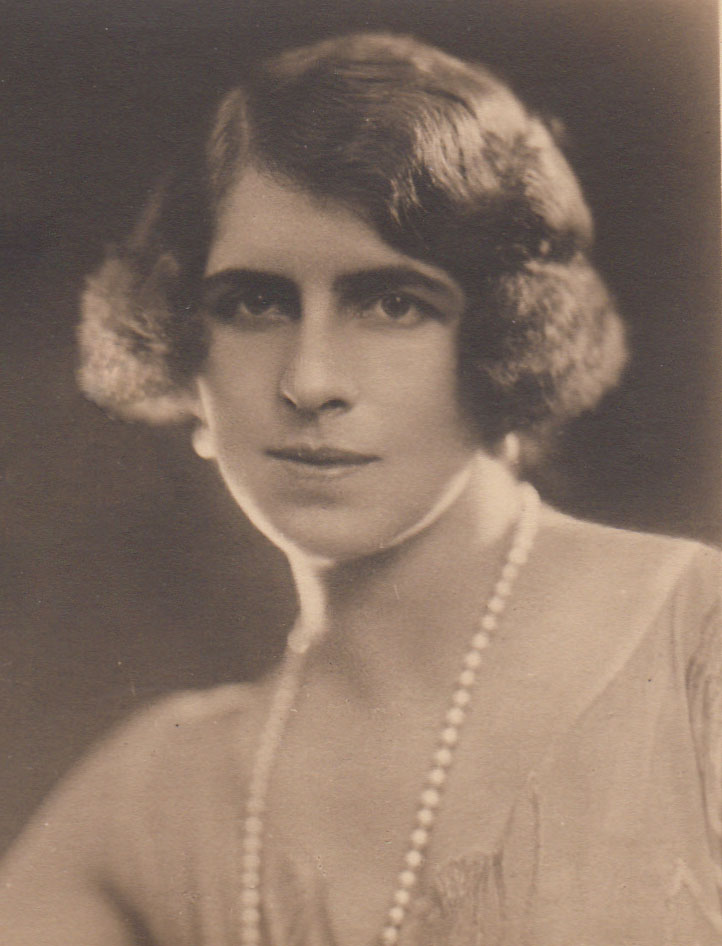
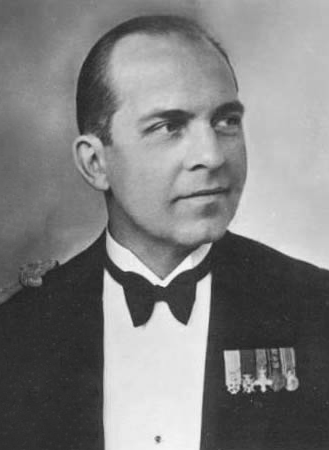
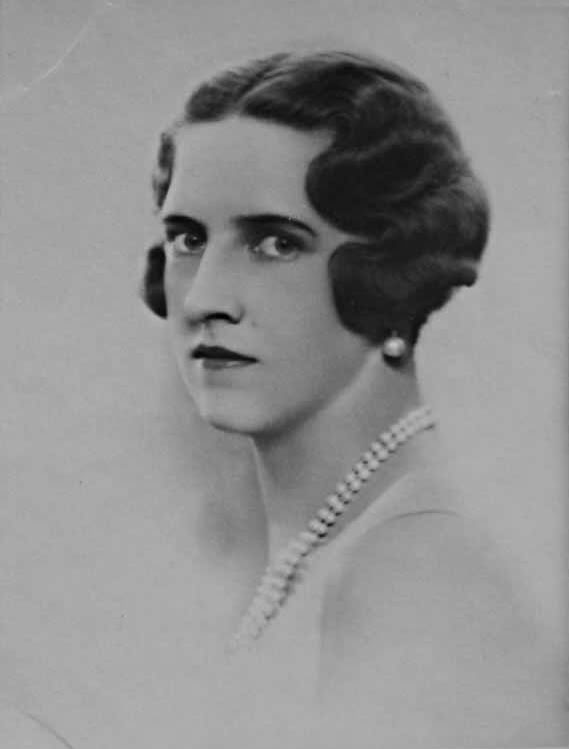
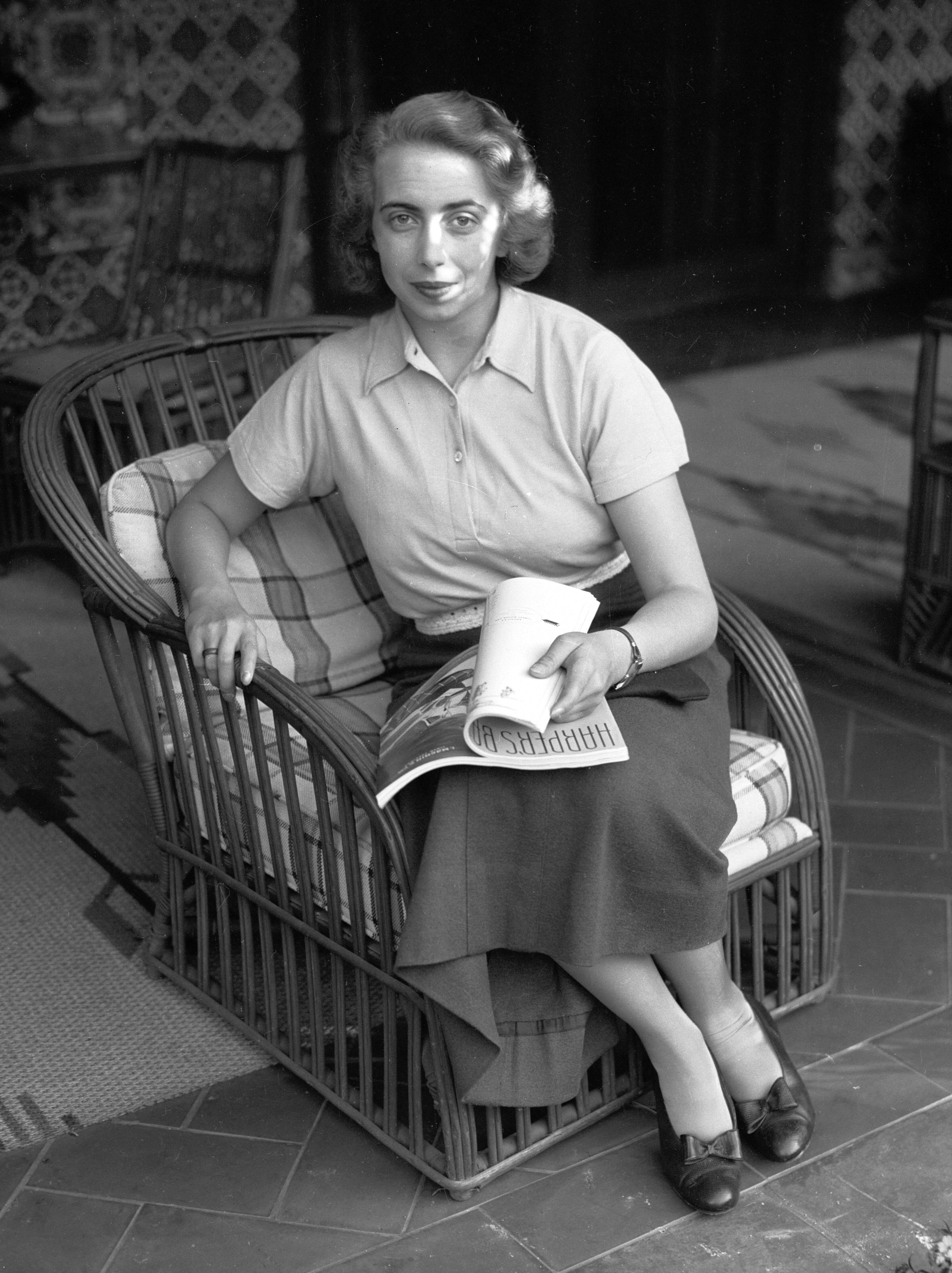
Image	Name	Birth	Death	Notes
	George II of Greece	20 July 1890	1 April 1947	married Princess Elisabeth of Romania; no issue.
	Alexander of Greece	1 August 1893	25 October 1920	married Aspasia Manos; had issue, Queen Alexandra of Yugoslavia.
	Princess Helen of Greece and Denmark	2 May 1896	28 November 1982	married the future Carol II of Romania; had issue, Michael I of Romania.
	Paul of Greece	14 December 1901	6 March 1964	married Princess Frederica of Hanover; had issue, including Constantine II of Greece and Queen Sofía of Spain (herself the mother of Felipe VI of Spain).
	Princess Irene of Greece and Denmark	13 February 1904	15 April 1974	married Prince Aimone, Duke of Aosta, nominally King Tomislav II of Croatia from 1941 to 1943; had issue.
	Princess Katherine of Greece and Denmark	4 May 1913	2 October 2007	married Major Richard Brandram MC; had issue.

== Ancestry ==
Ancestors of Sophia of Prussia

8. Frederick William III of Prussia
4. Wilhelm I, German Emperor
9. Duchess Louise of Mecklenburg-Strelitz
2. Frederick III, German Emperor
10. Charles Frederick, Grand Duke of Saxe-Weimar-Eisenach
5. Princess Augusta of Saxe-Weimar-Eisenach
11. Grand Duchess Maria Pavlovna of Russia
1. Sophia of Prussia
12. Ernest I, Duke of Saxe-Coburg and Gotha
6. Prince Albert of Saxe-Coburg and Gotha
13. Princess Louise of Saxe-Gotha-Altenburg
3. Victoria, Princess Royal
14. Prince Edward, Duke of Kent and Strathearn
7. Queen Victoria of the United Kingdom
15. Princess Victoria of Saxe-Coburg-Saalfeld

== Sources ==
- Bennett, Daphne (1971). Vicky: Princess Royal of England & German Empress. London: Collins and Harvill Press. ISBN 000262883X.
- Bertin, Célia (1982). Marie Bonaparte (in French). Paris: Perrin. ISBN 226201602X.
- Clogg, Richard (1979). A Short History of Modern Greece. Cambridge University Press. ISBN 0521328373.
- La France héroïque et ses alliés (in French). Vol. II. Larousse. 1919.
- Driault, Édouard; Lhéritier, Michel (1926). Histoire diplomatique de la Grèce de 1821 à nos jours : La Grèce et la Grande Guerre - De la Révolution turque au traité de Lausanne (1908-1923) (in French). Vol. V. PUF.
- Gelardi, Julia P. (2005). Born to Rule: Five Reigning Consorts, Granddaughters of Queen Victoria. New York: St. Martin's Press. ISBN 0312324243.
- Leon, G. B. (1974). Greece and the Great Powers 1914-17. Thessaloniki: Institute of Balkan Studies. OCLC 462815121.
- Mateos Sainz de Medrano, Ricardo (2004). La Familia de la Reina Sofía : La Dinastía griega, la Casa de Hannover y los reales primos de Europa (in Spanish). Madrid: La Esfera de los Libros. ISBN 84-9734-195-3.
- Terrades, Marc (2005). Le Drame de l'hellénisme : Ion Dragoumis (1878-1920) et la question nationale en Grèce au début du xxe siècle (in French). L'Harmattan. ISBN 2747577880.
- Vacalopoulos, Apostolos (1975). Histoire de la Grèce moderne (in French). Horvath. ISBN 2-7171-0057-1.
- Van der Kiste, John (1994). Kings of the Hellenes : The Greek Kings, 1863-1974. Sutton. ISBN 0750921471.
- Van der Kiste, John, The Prussian Princesses: Sisters of Kaiser Wilhelm II, Fonthill, 2014
- Vickers, Hugo (2000). Alice, Princess Andrew of Greece. Londres: Hamish Hamilton. ISBN 0-241-13686-5.

Sophia of Prussia House of Hohenzollern Born: 14 June 1870 Died: 13 January 1932
Greek royalty
Preceded by Olga Constantinovna of Russia	Queen consort of the Hellenes; 18 March 1913 – 11 June 1917	Succeeded by Aspasia Manos (untitled)
Preceded by Aspasia Manos (Royal Consort)	Queen consort of the Hellenes; 19 December 1920 – 27 September 1922	Succeeded by Elisabeth of Romania
