= Richard Brandram =

British Army major (1911–1994)

Major Richard Brandram MC
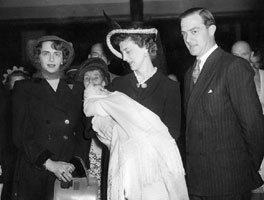
- Brandram (on the right) in 1948
- Born: 5 August 1911; Bexhill-on-Sea, East Sussex, England
- Died: 28 March 1994 (aged 82); Marlow, Buckinghamshire, England
- Spouse: Princess Katherine of Greece and Denmark (m. 1947)
- Children: 1

Richard Campbell Andrew Brandram, MC (5 August 1911 – 28 March 1994) was an officer in the British Army who saw active service in Italy during the Second World War, then served with the British Military Mission to the Iraqi Army. In later life, he was a Baltic Exchange shipbroker.

He is best known for marrying Princess Katherine of Greece and Denmark in 1947.

== Early life ==
Brandram was born on 5 August 1911 at Bexhill-on-Sea, Sussex, England. His father, Richard Andrew Brandram of Bickley, the head of a gentry family, was the founder and retired headmaster of a prep school, Bickley Park School in Kent, while his mother, Maud Campbell Blaker, was a housewife.

He was educated at Tonbridge School and Pembroke College, Cambridge. He was a keen rugby union player, having played for the University, then for the Kent R.F.U. in the county championships. In 1931, he played cricket for a team called Band of Brothers. In the summer of 1933, Brandram was part of a combined cricket and rugby tour by the Cambridge Vandals to Canada and the United States, which was the first ever recorded tour of a British rugby team to either country. Touring as a rugby back division specialist, he scored nine tries and was second top scorer. Soon he was playing for Blackheath F.C., at the time one of the top rugby clubs in England. The Illustrated Sporting and Dramatic News reported in 1935 that in his Cambridge days Brandram had "never seriously threatened to win another Blue for Tonbridge", but that in 1934 he had played outstandingly well for Blackheath and in the present season was "proving a very menacing person". He was still playing for the club in 1937.

== Career ==
Having been a cadet company sergeant major in the Tonbridge School Officers' Training Corps, Brandram was commissioned into the Territorial Army as a second lieutenant in the Royal Artillery on 15 July 1939. He served with the artillery during the Second World War, reaching the war substantive rank of captain. In 1944, he was injured while fighting in the Italian campaign and was posted as Inspector of Artillery to the British Military Mission in Baghdad attached to the Iraqi Army, remaining there for some years.

On 31 August 1946, Brandram transferred to the Regular Army as a lieutenant in the Royal Artillery, with seniority from 1 August 1938, and was promoted to captain effective from 31 August 1946, with seniority from 5 August 1942. On 5 August 1947 he was promoted to major. On 7 February 1950 he was dismissed from the service by sentence of a general court-martial.

In 1956, Brandram was working for Cambridge (Tankers) Ltd., a shipping company in the City of London with a focus on oil tankers, and was elected as a member of the Baltic Exchange. In July 1962, Brandram was reported to be a shipping-broker. In 1961, he was a director of Cambridge (Tankers) Ltd. and still held that directorship in 1971. It was reported in 1969 that he was still a member of the Baltic Exchange.

== Personal life ==
On 3 February 1947, the Greek Royal family announced the engagement of Brandram to Princess Katherine of Greece and Denmark, daughter of Constantine I of Greece and Queen Sophia. The British newspapers described Brandram as "a six-foot soldier Rugby player" and reported that the couple had met in May 1946 on RMS Ascania, when Brandram was returning to England from Baghdad for his first home leave since 1944, while the princess was sailing for England after a wartime exile in Egypt. The Bromley & West Kent Mercury reported that as children both had attended schools in Broadstairs, Kent, but understood they had not met then. It was also reported that Brandram's parents were then living at the Well House, St George's Road, Bickley, Kent. The two were married privately by Archbishop Damaskinos in the Great Reception Room of the Royal Palace of Athens on 21 April 1947, with King Paul of Greece acting as best man. After the wedding, Brandram returned to his post in Baghdad, taking his new wife with him.

On 25 August 1947, shortly before Prince Philip, her first cousin, was due to marry the future Queen Elizabeth II, King George VI granted Princess Katherine the status of the daughter of a duke in the British order of precedence. Brandram already had a coat of arms, granted in 1795 to Samuel Brandram of Sise Lane in the City of London, blazoned "A pile wavy ermine between two bees volant in fesse or", and impaled with it the royal arms of Greece, with the agreement of Sir Gerald Wollaston, Norroy and Ulster King of Arms.

After returning to England from Baghdad, the Brandrams lived in Eaton Square, Belgravia, and at Croft Cottage, Marlow, Buckinghamshire. On 1 April 1948 came the birth of their only child, Richard Paul George Andrew Brandram, at Marylebone. He was christened at St Michael's, Chester Square, in June 1948, his godparents being King Paul of Greece, the Queen of Romania, Prince Philip, Duke of Edinburgh, the Duchess of Kent, Princess Irene, Duchess of Aosta, Major P. A. Uniecke, Captain H. H. Cruddas, and Mrs P. J. H. Dunn. Later known as Paul Brandram, he was a frequent visitor to the Villa Sparta in Florence and like his father worked in the financial markets of the City of London.

Brandram's father died in Kent in November 1962, leaving an estate valued for probate at £15,304 (equivalent to £285,641 in 2025). His mother died in 1971.

Richard Brandram died on 28 March 1994, at the age of 82, after a long illness. Lady Katherine Brandram died in 2007.

== Honours ==
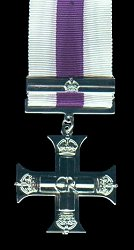
Photo of a Military Cross

On 29 June 1944, Brandram was awarded the Military Cross for "gallant and distinguished services in Italy" during the Second World War. On 20 March 1947 he was awarded the Efficiency Medal (Territorial). This was replaced by the award of the Territorial Efficiency Decoration on 21 April 1950 and his award of the Efficiency Medal consequently cancelled on 24 August 1951, but the award of the TD was also cancelled by forfeiture on 8 May 1953.
