= Putney Pusher =

Unidentified jogger who pushed woman in path of London bus

- Putney Pusher suspect on CCTV
- Wanted by: Metropolitan Police
- Wanted since: 5 May 2017

Details
- Victims: 1
- Date: 5 May 2017; 7:40 am
- Country: United Kingdom
- Locations: Putney Bridge, London
- Killed: 0
- Injured: 1

The Putney Pusher is an unidentified male who, unprovoked, pushed a woman into the path of oncoming traffic on Putney Bridge, London, on 5 May 2017. The woman narrowly avoided being struck by a bus. CCTV footage of the incident was released in August 2017 and subsequently went viral. Despite efforts to identify the man, the Metropolitan Police closed the case in June 2018, stating that all leads had been exhausted.

In June 2026, a 44-year-old man, later identified as Nicholas Brandram, was arrested on "suspicion of attempted grievous bodily harm" in connection with the case. He died at his home in September 2026. His family said that he was not responsible for the incident.

== Incident ==
At around 7:40 am on Friday, 5 May 2017, an unidentified male jogger pushed a woman onto the road with his right hand, in front of a double-decker bus operating route 430 travelling south on Putney Bridge, London. The bus swerved, narrowly avoiding her. The jogger continued running.

The woman, aged 33, sustained minor injuries. The bus stopped and passengers assisted her. Fifteen minutes later, the man jogged back across the bridge. The woman attempted to confront him, but he ignored her and continued north along the River Thames. The bus driver, Oliver Salbris, later said that he attributed the swerve to reflex and believed the woman could have been seriously harmed had he not reacted in time.

On 7 August 2017, the Metropolitan Police released CCTV footage of the incident. The footage attracted international attention and went viral online. Police reported receiving a "huge response" from the public with information about the man's identity. In September 2017, they released further images of the suspect.

=== Media reaction ===
The release of the footage prompted widespread discussion and public anger. The jogger was dubbed the "Putney Pusher" by the media. Commentators debated possible motives, including so‑called "jogger rage", misogyny, and violence against women. Matthew Weaver of The Guardian wrote that the jogger had become "a national hate figure". The case also attracted significant attention from online amateur investigators, particularly on Reddit.

In 2021, playwright Sonya Kelly wrote Once Upon a Bridge, a 90‑minute play inspired by the incident. It presents the perspectives of the bus driver, the jogger, and the victim. Police said they hoped the play might encourage people with information to come forward.

== Investigation ==
The suspect is described as a white male in his 30s with short brown hair and brown eyes. He was wearing a light grey T-shirt, dark blue shorts, and grey trainers at the time of the incident.

On 10 August 2017, a man was arrested but released two days later after providing evidence that he had been in the United States at the time. By September, the suspect had still not been identified. Former DCI Peter Kirkham attributed the lack of progress to budget cuts and a shortage of detectives.

More than 50 people were questioned during the investigation, and three individuals were detained, all of whom were later released. The Metropolitan Police closed the case in June 2018, stating that all leads had been exhausted. The failure to identify the suspect was considered unusual given the extensive CCTV coverage in London and the high level of public interest. It became a notorious cold case in London.

=== Arrest and death of suspect ===
On 15 June 2026, Nicholas Brandram, a 44-year-old man, was arrested at his home in Chiswick on "suspicion of attempted grievous bodily harm" in connection with the attack, nine years after the incident, after new information came to light. He was also arrested on suspicion of possession of Class A and Class B drugs. The arrest was announced by the Metropolitan Police, and he was bailed later the same day. In September, it was reported that he had been released under investigation. He had been a decorated former British Army captain who served in Afghanistan, Bosnia and Iraq, and was a descendant of Queen Victoria as the grandson of Princess Katherine of Greece and Denmark. In 2013, Brandram was convicted of crashing his Harley-Davidson motorbike into a female cyclist near Hyde Park Corner and leaving the scene without providing his details.

Brandram was found dead at his home in Chiswick on 15 September 2026. His family released a statement on 17 September, saying that he died by suicide "after months of immense pressure caused by a Metropolitan Police investigation" and that there was no forensic evidence connecting him to the case. On the same day, the Metropolitan Police referred itself to the Independent Office of Police Conduct regarding the force's dealings with Brandram before his death.
