= Princess Katherine of Greece and Denmark =

Child of Constantine I of Greece (1913–2007)

Princess Katherine
- Lady Katherine Brandram
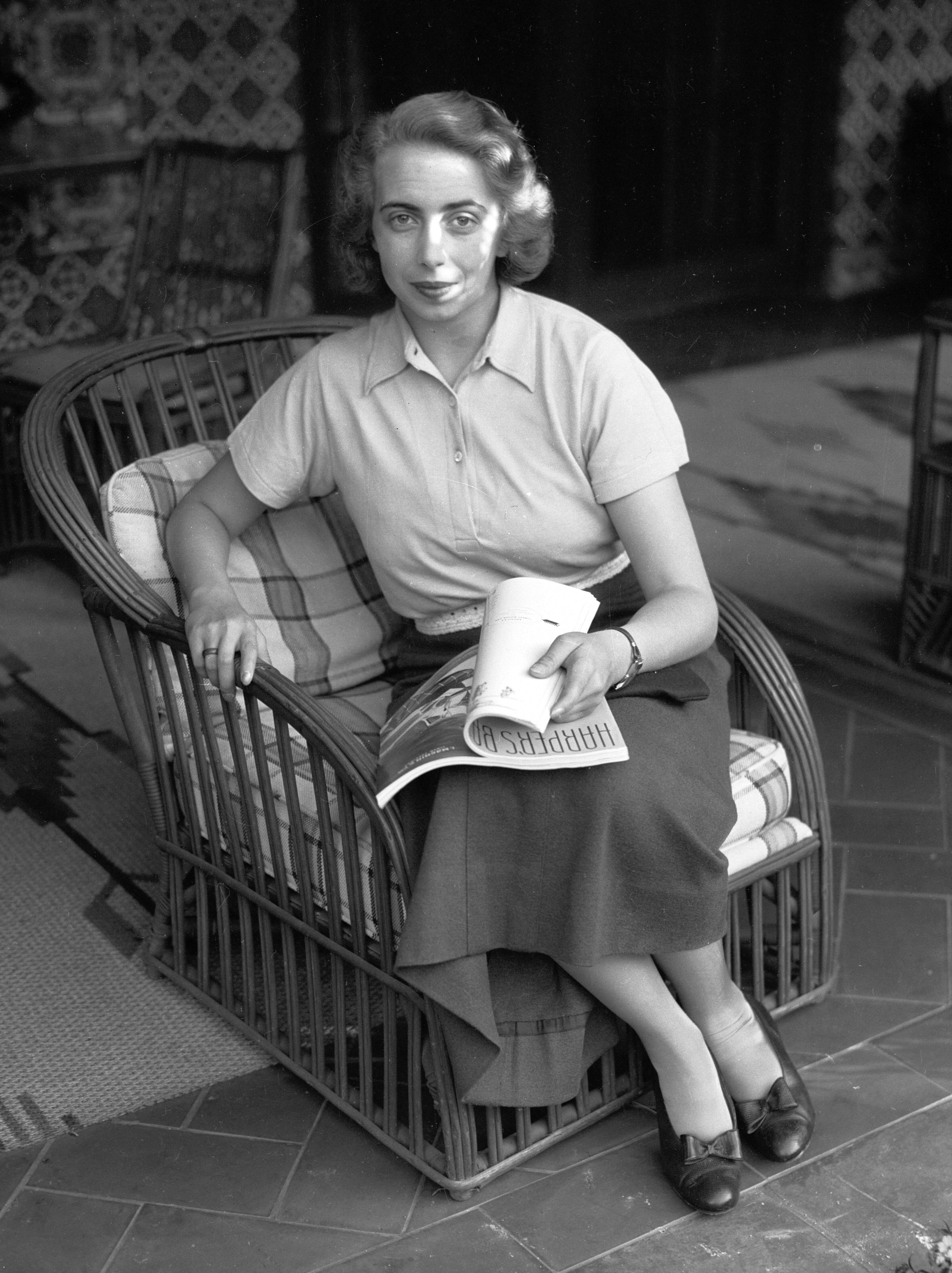
- Princess Katherine in 1935
- Born: 4 May 1913; Athens, Greece
- Died: 2 October 2007 (aged 94); London, England
- Burial: 11 October 2007; Royal Cemetery, Tatoi Palace, Greece
- Spouse: Richard Brandram (m. 1947; died 1994)
- Issue: Paul Brandram
- House: Glücksburg
- Father: Constantine I of Greece
- Mother: Sophia of Prussia

Princess Katherine of Greece and Denmark (Greek: Αικατερίνη; 4 May 1913 – 2 October 2007), styled in the United Kingdom as Lady Katherine Brandram from 1947 until 2007, was the third daughter and youngest child of King Constantine I of Greece and Princess Sophia of Prussia.

== Early life ==
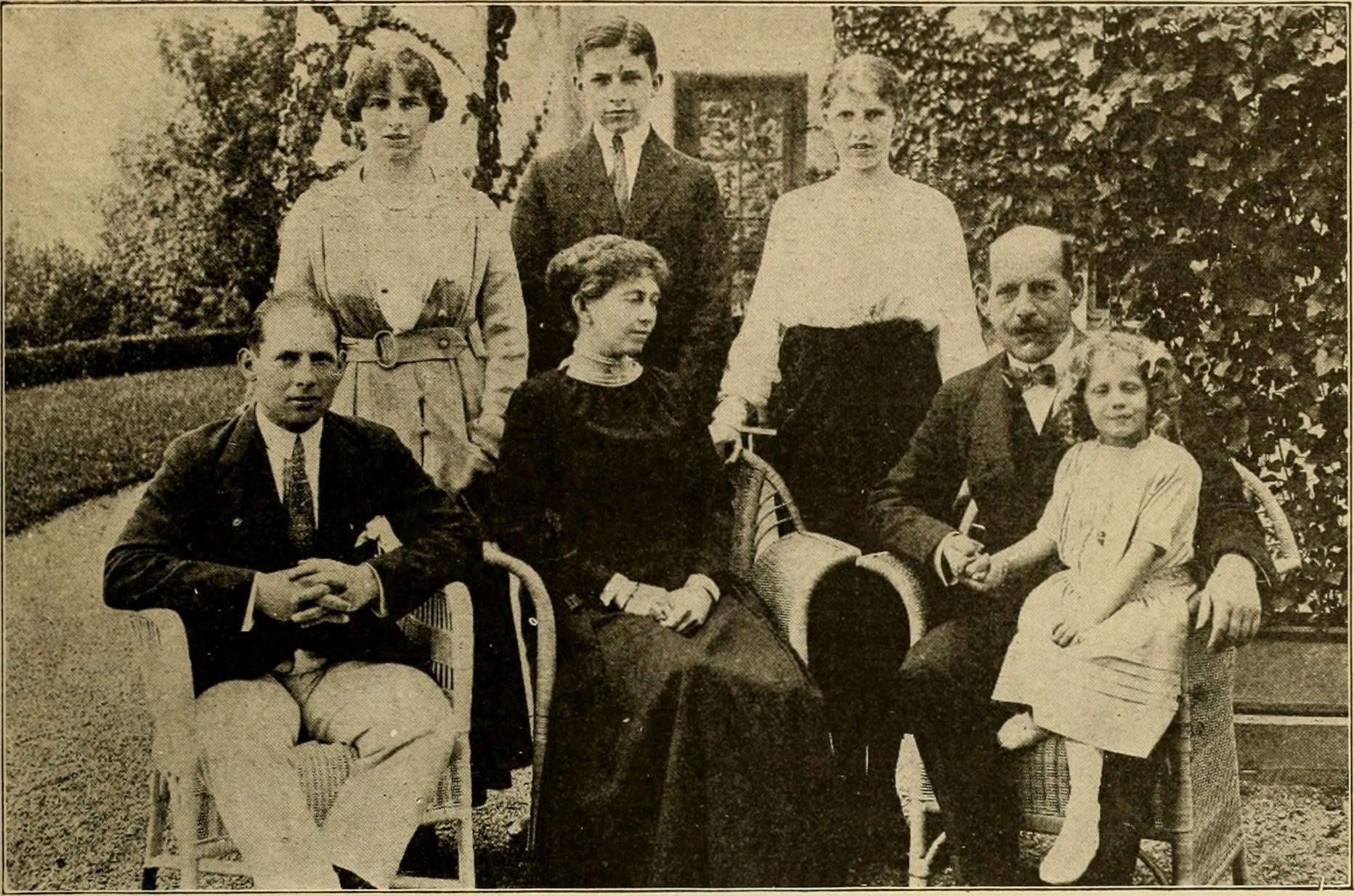
Katherine (far right) and her family in 1919, then in exile in Switzerland

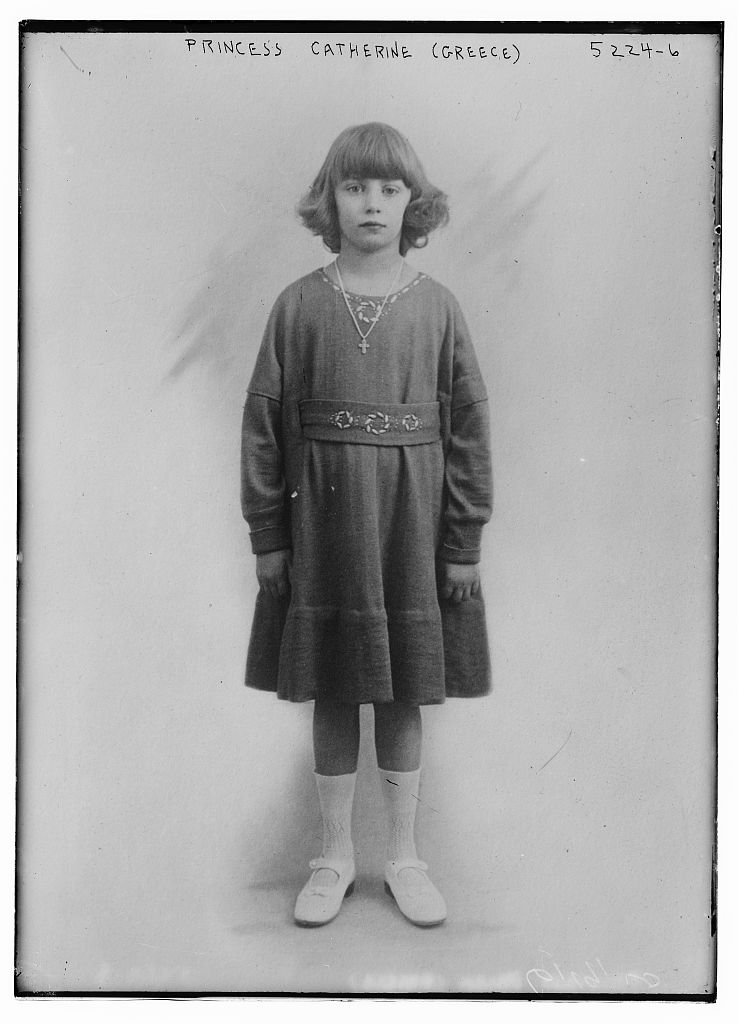
Princess Katherine of Greece in 1920

Katherine was born on 4 May 1913 in the Royal Palace in Athens, a few weeks after her paternal grandfather, King George I of the Hellenes, was assassinated in Thessaloniki. She had five siblings – three brothers (George, Alexander and Paul, each of whom would become King of the Hellenes) and two sisters (Princess Helen, who married Crown Prince Carol of Romania, and Princess Irene who married Prince Aimone of Savoy, Duke of Spoleto).

She was christened on 14 June 1913. Her godparents were Olga Constantinovna (the Dowager Queen of Greece, her paternal grandmother), Alexandra (the Dowager Queen of the United Kingdom, her paternal grandfather's sister and her maternal grandmother's sister-in-law), George V (the King of the United Kingdom, her mother's maternal cousin and her father's paternal cousin), Wilhelm II, German Emperor (her maternal uncle), The Greek Navy (represented by the Minister of Marine) and The Greek Army (represented by the Minister of War). During the First World War, when her parents were suspected of sympathising with the Germans, she was rescued at three years of age from the Tatoi Palace, outside Athens, after the Secret Police set fire to the building.

== Life in exile ==
Her father abdicated in 1917, replaced as king by her brother Alexander. She and her parents were exiled to Switzerland. They were reinstated following Alexander's death in 1920, but Constantine abdicated again in 1922. Exiled again, this time to Sicily, her father died in Palermo in 1923. The family moved to Villa Sparta in Florence, where Katherine took up painting. Her second brother George became King George II in 1922, but was deposed in 1924.

Katherine was educated in England, at a boarding school at Broadstairs and then North Foreland Lodge. Her mother died in January 1932, after which she continued to live at the Villa Sparta with her sister, Helen. She and the future Elizabeth II were bridesmaids at the wedding of her first cousin, Princess Marina, to Prince George in 1934.

== Return to Greece and marriage ==
Her brother George was reinstated as king in 1935, and Katherine returned to Greece with her sister, Irene. She joined the Greek Red Cross when the Second World War broke out in 1939. In 1941, after Greece had been overrun by Axis forces, she fled to South Africa with her third brother, Paul, in a Sunderland flying boat, where she worked as a nurse at a hospital in Cape Town. She heard no news of her sister Helen for four years. She returned to England in 1946, sailing the last leg from Egypt to England on the Cunard liner RMS Ascania. On board, she met Major Richard Campbell Brandram MC (5 August 1911 – 5 April 1994), an officer in the British Royal Artillery. They were engaged three weeks after they arrived in England, but their engagement was announced only in February 1947. On 1 April at the Royal Palace, three weeks prior to the wedding, her brother King George had a stroke and died shortly after in Katherine's presence. George was succeeded on the Greek throne by Katherine's third brother Paul, who acted as best man at the wedding, which took place according to schedule on 21 April 1947.

She then accompanied her husband to his new army posting in Baghdad, and they later settled in England. On 25 August 1947, King George VI granted her the rank and title of a duke's daughter and she became known as Lady Katherine Brandram. She and her husband lived in Belgravia and then in Marlow, Buckinghamshire.

According to her obituary in The Daily Telegraph, "Lady Katherine lived quietly but remained in close touch with her own and the British royal families. She attended the Queen's wedding to Prince Philip (her first cousin on her father’s side and second cousin once removed on her mother’s side), and was a guest at the service to mark Prince Philip's 80th birthday at St George's Chapel, Windsor, in 2001."

After the death of Infanta Beatriz of Spain in 2002, Katherine was the last surviving great-granddaughter of Queen Victoria, as well the last surviving grandchild of Frederick III, German Emperor and Victoria, Princess Royal. She lived for almost 87 years after the death of her brother, King Alexander, and her death left her second cousin (on her mother’s side) and second cousin once removed (on her father's side) Count Carl Johan Bernadotte of Sweden (31 October 1916 – 5 May 2012) as Queen Victoria's last living great-grandchild.

From the time of the death of her eldest sister Queen Helen, Queen Mother of Romania in 1982, to the time of her own death, she was Queen Victoria's most senior female line descendant. Her death marked the end of all female-line direct descendants of Frederick III, German Emperor and Victoria, Princess Royal.

== Issue ==
Princess Katherine of Greece and Denmark and Major Richard Campbell Andrew Brandram had one child:

- (Richard) Paul (George Andrew) Brandram (1 April 1948 - 9 May 2020), married Jennifer Steele on 12 February 1975; they had three children. Their second child, Nicholas George Brandram, born 23 April 1982, died by suicide on 15 September 2026 whilst under suspicion of being the Putney Pusher.

== Bibliography ==
- Bertin, Celia (1982). Marie Bonaparte (in French). Paris: Perrin. p. 433. ISBN 2-262-01602-X.
- Celada, Eva (2007). Irene de Grecia (in Spanish). Plaza & Janés. p. 283.ISBN 978-84-01-30545-0, 84-01-30545-4

== Ancestry ==
Ancestors of Princess Katherine of Greece and Denmark

8. Christian IX of Denmark
4. George I of Greece
9. Louise of Hesse-Kassel
2. Constantine I, King of the Hellenes
10. Grand Duke Konstantin Nikolayevich of Russia
5. Olga Constantinovna of Russia
11. Princess Alexandra of Saxe-Altenburg
1. Princess Katherine of Greece and Denmark
12. William I, German Emperor
6. Frederick III, German Emperor
13. Augusta of Saxe-Weimar-Eisenach
3. Sophia of Prussia
14. Albert of Saxe-Coburg and Gotha
7. Victoria, Princess Royal
15. Victoria of the United Kingdom
