= Princess Irene of Greece and Denmark =

Greek princess (1942–2026)

Princess Irene
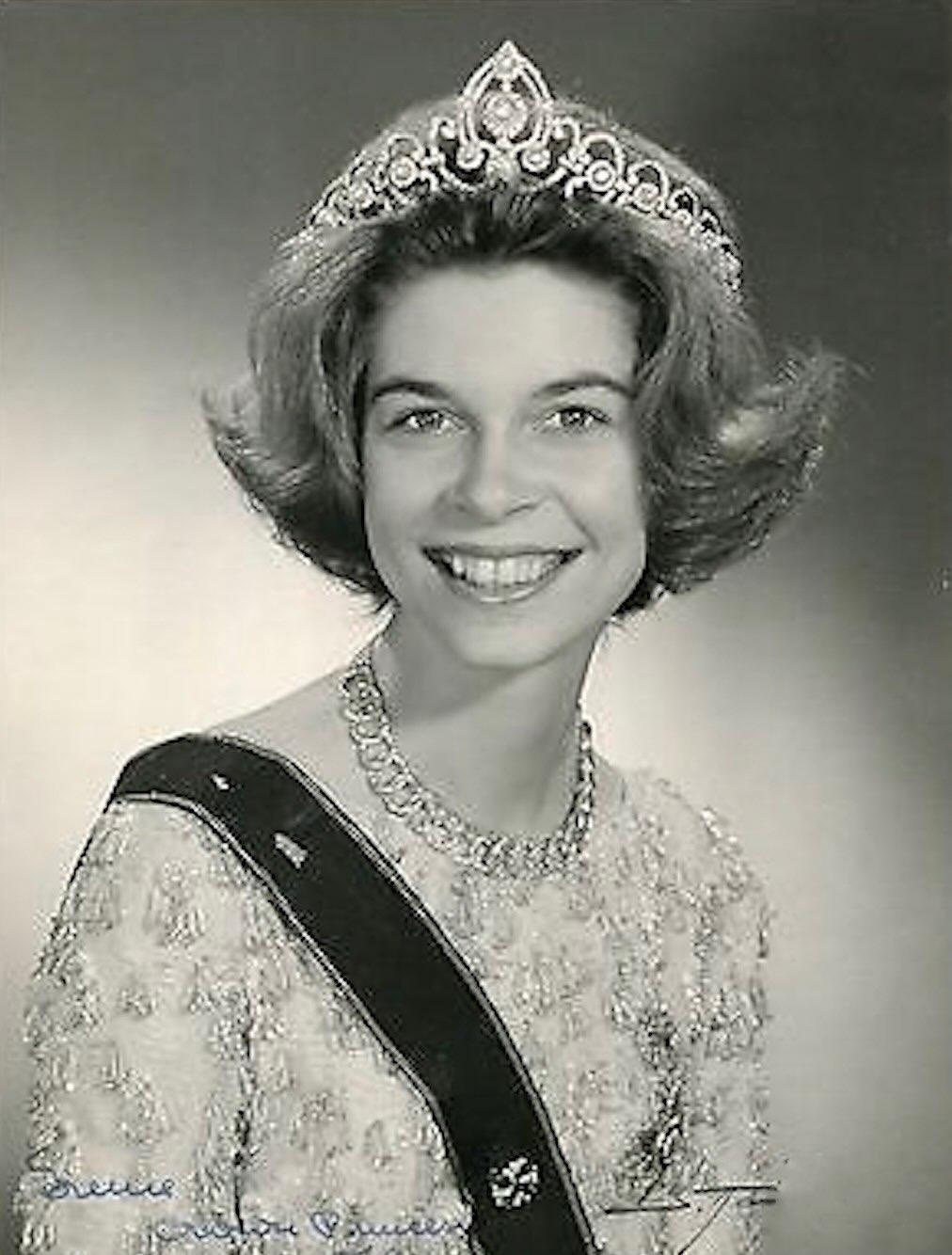
- Irene in 1968
- Born: 11 May 1942; Cape Town, Cape Province, South Africa
- Died: 15 January 2026 (aged 83); Palace of Zarzuela, Madrid, Spain
- Burial: 19 January 2026; Royal Cemetery, Tatoi Palace, Greece
- House: Glücksburg
- Father: Paul of Greece
- Mother: Frederica of Hanover
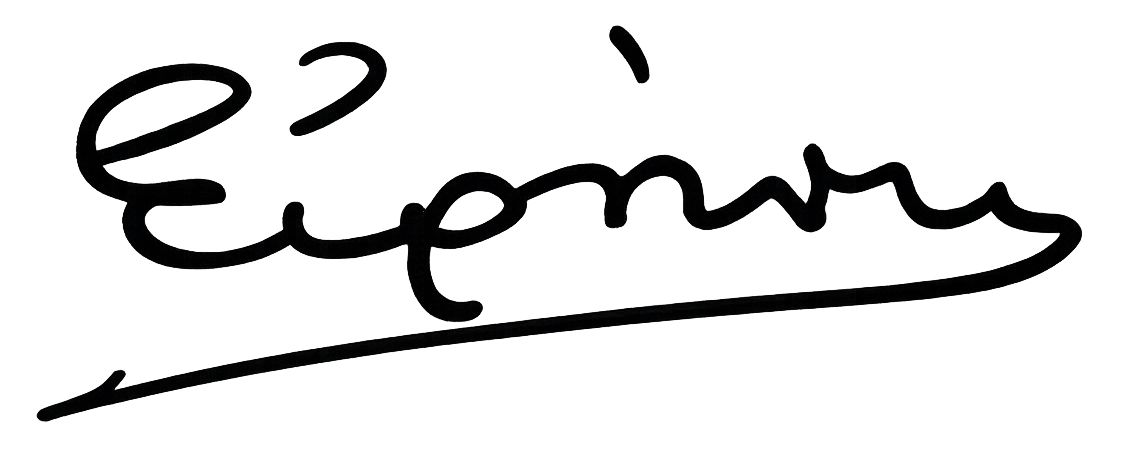
- Signature

Princess Irene of Greece and Denmark (Greek: Ειρήνη, romanized: Iríni; 11 May 1942 – 15 January 2026) was the youngest child and second daughter of King Paul of Greece and his wife, Queen Frederica. She was the younger sister of Queen Sofía of Spain and King Constantine II of Greece. In the 1960s, she briefly had a career as a professional pianist. From 1981 until her death, Irene lived permanently in Spain, becoming a part of the wider Spanish royal family as Queen Sofía's sister, to whose family she remained very close.

== Early life ==
Irene was born on 11 May 1942 in Cape Town, Union of South Africa, where her parents were living in exile because of the German invasion of Greece during the Second World War. She was the younger daughter of Paul, Crown Prince of Greece (later King Paul), and his wife Frederica of Hanover. She was christened three weeks after her birth at her parents' Claremont rented home by the Metropolitan of the Holy Archdiocese of Johannesburg and Pretoria and was named after her paternal aunt Princess Irene, Duchess of Aosta. She had ten godparents, including General Jan Smuts, Lady Katherine Brandram (her paternal aunt), King George II of Greece (her paternal uncle), Queen Mary of the United Kingdom, and the Duchess of Kent (her paternal first cousin once removed).

In 1944 the family moved to Egypt and returned to Greece in 1946 after the approval of the continuity of the Greek monarchy in the referendum with her uncle George II. In 1947 her father became King of the Hellenes after the death of his brother. Irene was educated at Arsakion school at Psykhikó Palace in Greece and at Schule Schloss Salem in Baden-Württemberg, Germany. Irene took up the piano in 1962. She was a pupil of concert pianist Gina Bachauer and became a professional concert pianist herself.

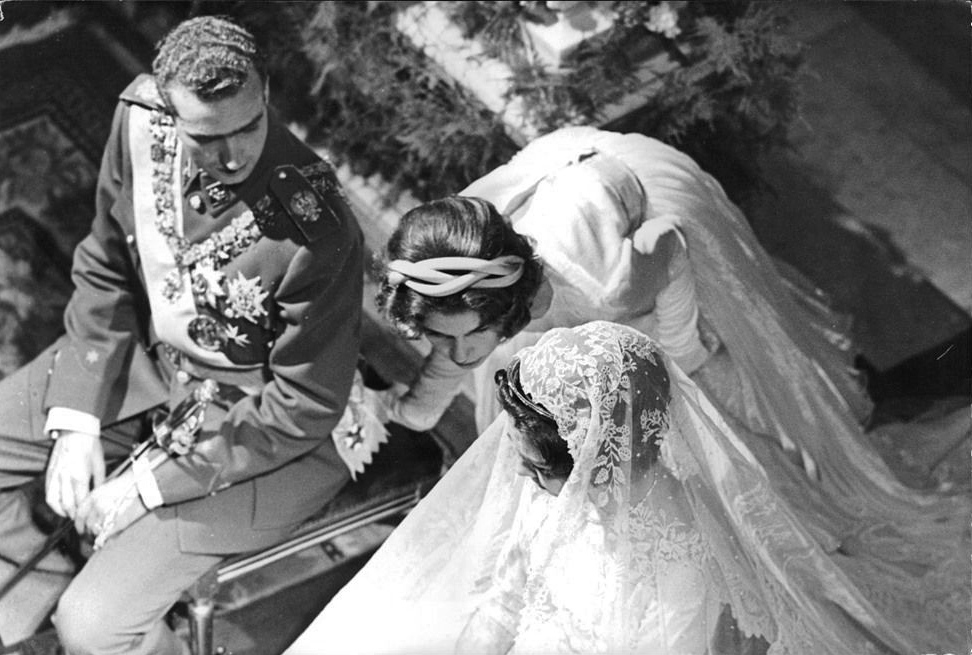
Princess Irene served as bridesmaid at her sister’s wedding, 1962.

As a young woman, Irene was courted by Prince Michel, Count of Évreux, younger son of the Orléanist pretender Henri, Count of Paris, until he met and later married a French noblewoman without his father's consent in 1967. She was also a potential bride of Crown Prince Harald of Norway (later King Harald V) who later married Sonja Haraldsen in 1968. Irene was one of the bridesmaids at the wedding of Spanish Prince Juan Carlos and Princess Sofía in 1962. Her brother Constantine became king in 1964 after the death of their father.

Between her father's death and the birth of her niece Princess Alexia, Irene was heir presumptive to the Greek throne.

== Career ==
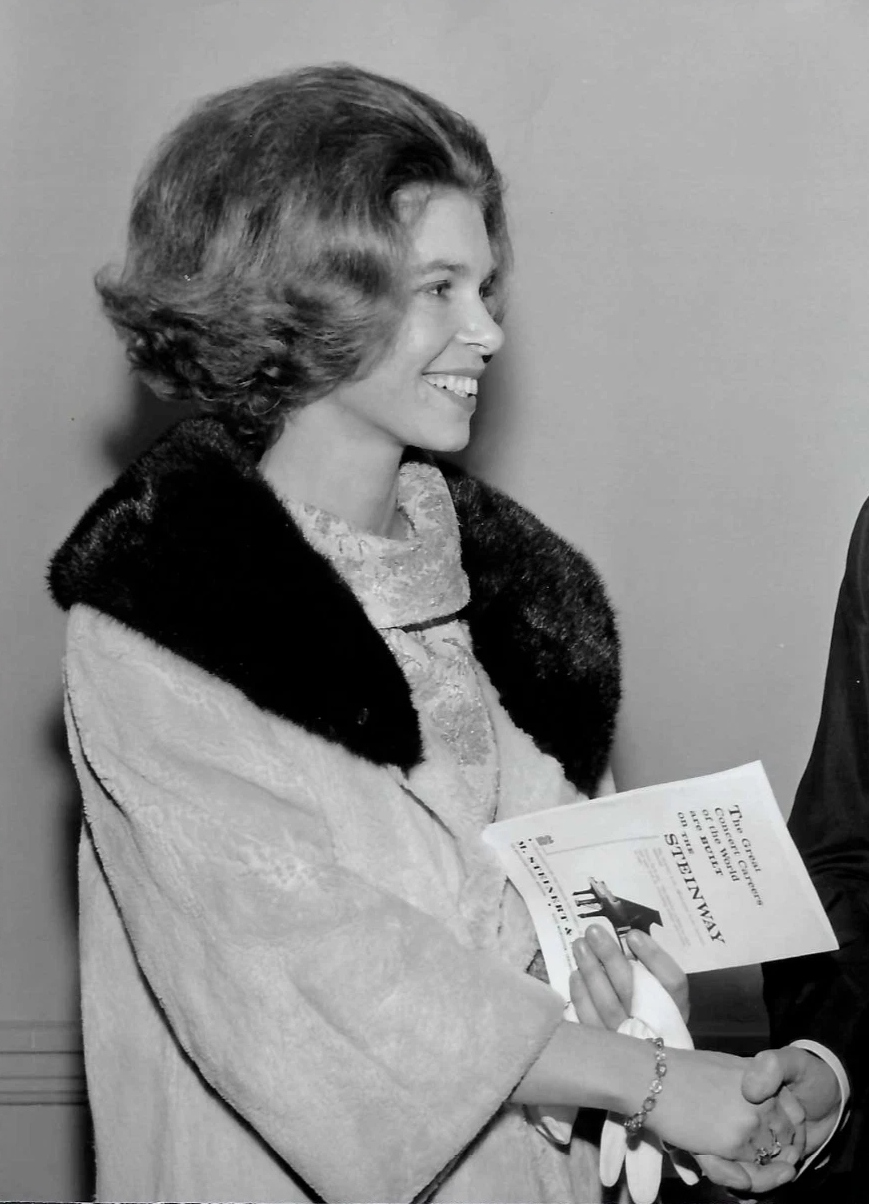
Irene in 1967

Irene developed an interest in music at an early age and studied piano under the Greek concert pianist Gina Bachauer (1913–1976), who became her teacher, friend and frequent musical collaborator. Their association dated back to Irene's childhood, when Bachauer visited the Greek royal family in Athens. Irene later recalled that Bachauer's visits were occasions for informal musical activities at home. When Irene began studying piano more seriously at around the age of 19, her father, King Paul, told Bachauer about her difficulties with the instrument. Bachauer subsequently offered to help her, beginning a close teacher–pupil relationship that lasted for several years. Irene described Bachauer as both her countrywoman and a close personal friend.

Irene appeared alongside Bachauer at a number of concerts in Europe and the United States. The two frequently performed works for two pianos, including Mozart's Concerto for Two Pianos. Their musical partnership brought Irene into contact with orchestras and concert audiences in several countries. Irene, she also gave charity concerts in Europe and the United States.

In 1966, Irene helped Bachauer and the Utah Symphony make an international concert tour possible. The orchestra travelled to Greece, Yugoslavia, Austria, Germany and England, strengthening Bachauer's existing relationship with European audiences. The Utah Symphony's association with Bachauer had developed through her appearances with the orchestra under conductor Maurice Abravanel. Irene subsequently performed with Bachauer and the orchestra, becoming associated with the musical relationship that helped establish Bachauer's lasting connection with Utah.

In 1967, Irene accompanied Bachauer on a concert tour of the United States, performing with her in several American cities. The tour formed part of their wider musical collaboration, during which Irene appeared as Bachauer's piano partner in performances of works for two pianos.

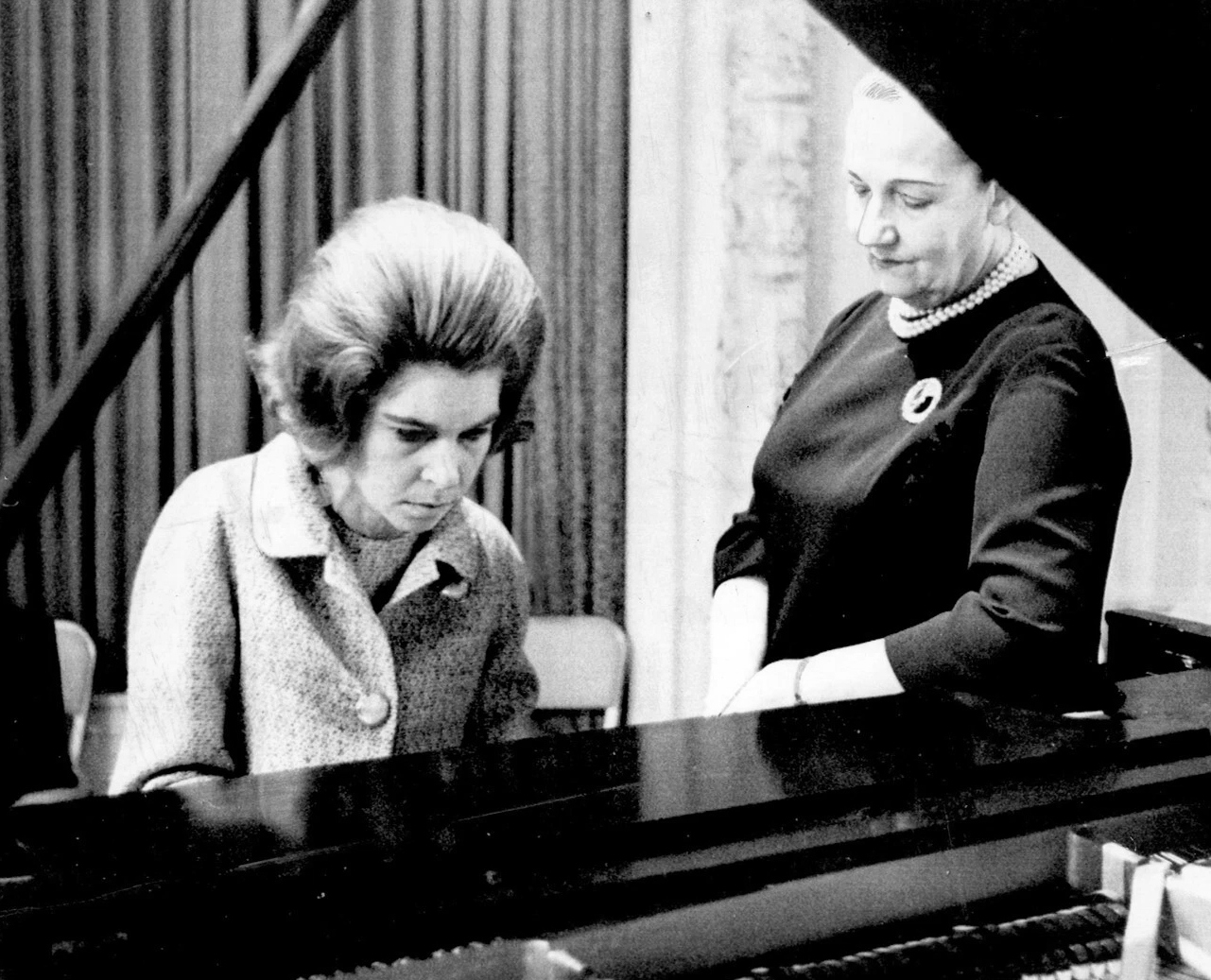
Princess Irene and Gina Bachauer in 1969

In 1969, Irene performed with Bachauer and the Utah Symphony at the Salt Lake Tabernacle in Salt Lake City. Conducted by Abravanel, the programme included Johann Sebastian Bach's Concerto for Two Harpsichords in C major, although pianos were used for the performance to produce a stronger sound in the venue. Irene's appearance with the orchestra was later recalled in the local press as part of her longstanding association with Utah and Bachauer.

That same year, Irene appeared at the Royal Festival Hall in London with the Cincinnati Symphony Orchestra, performing Bach's Concerto for Two Pianos with Bachauer. The performance was attended by members of the British royal family, including Prince Charles, Princess Anne and Lord Mountbatten. Irene's mother and brother were also in attendance.

In 1971, Irene joined Bachauer in a benefit concert for the Dallas Symphony Orchestra, which was experiencing financial difficulties. The pair performed Mozart's Concerto for Two Pianos as part of a programme intended to raise funds for the orchestra. The appearance of the Greek princess alongside the internationally recognised pianist attracted a large audience, and the event raised approximately $100,000 for the orchestra.

Bachauer died in 1976, but Irene continued to maintain an association with her teacher's musical legacy. The Gina Bachauer International Piano Competition, established in 1976, was created to support and recognise young pianists and preserve Bachauer's contribution to classical music. The competition began at Brigham Young University in Utah and moved to Salt Lake City in 1980 under the patronage of the Utah Symphony. It subsequently became an international event attracting competitors from numerous countries.

Irene became the competition's royal patroness and took part in events commemorating Bachauer. In 1986, she served as the competition's royal patron and was among the special guests featured in a television programme about its eighth edition. The programme, produced by KUED in Salt Lake City, presented the competition's finalists and included Irene as a former student and close personal friend of Bachauer. It was intended to introduce a wider audience to the young pianists and their performances.

Irene also attended the competition in Salt Lake City in 1991, when she travelled to Utah to hear the final rounds and the selection of its winners. Speaking to the Deseret News, she praised the organisers and described the event as a fitting tribute to Bachauer, who she believed would have welcomed the opportunity it gave young musicians. Irene also spoke about the importance of Bachauer's encouragement during her own musical education and recalled the close relationship they had developed over the years.

By 1991, Irene continued to play the piano, although she explained that her charitable responsibilities and other commitments left her with less time to practise. She expressed admiration for the dedication of the young musicians participating in the Bachauer competition, commenting on the discipline and determination required to pursue a career in music. Her continued involvement with the competition reflected the importance of Bachauer's influence on her life and her interest in supporting young performers.

== Exile and India ==
After her brother's failed counter-coup against the military junta on 13 December 1967, Irene followed the Greek royal family into exile. Unlike her brother Constantine, Irene maintained a relatively private life during the early years of exile, concentrating on music and her personal interests. Irene used music as a means of coping with the displacement and uncertainty of exile. She continued her piano studies and musical development, receiving further guidance from the violinist and conductor Yehudi Menuhin. Her developing career also took her beyond Italy, with performances and musical engagements in other European countries and the United States.

=== India ===
Following their period in Rome, Princess Irene and her mother, Queen Frederica, developed a lasting connection with India, particularly the city of Madras (now Chennai). Both were interested in Indian philosophy, religion and spirituality, and their visits gradually became an important part of their lives. Frederica had already become interested in Indian thought and religious traditions, and Irene shared this interest. They met religious teachers, visited centres of spiritual learning and, in Irene's case, pursued formal philosophical studies.

Frederica and Irene's interest in Indian spirituality predated their longer residence in the country. In December 1966, they travelled to southern India to meet the Kanchi Sankaracharya, Sri Chandrasekharendra Saraswathi. An account published by the Kanchi Kamakoti Peetham states that the two women had already been practising meditation and were familiar with Advaita Vedanta through the teachings of Ramana Maharshi. They had previously visited India with King Paul, but had not then had sufficient time to explore its religious traditions in depth. Their 1966 visit included meetings with the Sankaracharya at Kalahasti on 4 and 5 December.

The two also visited Sri Ramana Ashram at Tiruvannamalai, the ashram associated with Ramana Maharshi. An account in the January 1967 issue of The Mountain Path, the ashram's journal, records the visit of Queen Frederica and Princess Irene in 1966. Their interest in Ramana Maharshi's teachings formed part of their wider study of Indian philosophy and contemplative traditions. They returned to Sri Ramana Asramam in January 1973. The April 1973 issue of The Mountain Path describes their visit and their interest in the sacred landscape of Arunachala, including Skandashram and Virupaksha Cave. The account also records their visit to the Arunachaleswara Temple.

Madras became the principal centre of Irene's Indian life. She studied philosophy under T. M. P. Mahadevan, an Indian philosopher and scholar of Advaita Vedanta who was associated with the University of Madras. Mahadevan was Director of the university's Centre for Advanced Study in Philosophy and was an influential interpreter of Advaita, the philosophical tradition concerned with the non-duality of the self and ultimate reality. Under his guidance, Irene studied Indian philosophical and religious thought, including its relationship with the traditions of the Greek Orthodox Church. Her interest was comparative: she explored connections between Indian texts and the writings of the Church Fathers rather than simply abandoning her earlier religious background. The Greek royal family's biographical account describes her work with Mahadevan as a significant part of her intellectual development in India.

Irene was in India when her mother died in Spain on 6 February 1981. Frederica had travelled to Spain and was staying at the Zarzuela Palace, the residence of Queen Sofía and King Juan Carlos, when she died.

In January 1982, her sister Queen Sofía and King Juan Carlos made an official visit to India. After completing their visit to New Delhi, the Spanish royal couple travelled to Madras, where Irene had been living for several years. During the same visit, Sofía and Irene attended the presentation of a book by an Indian writer in Madras on 28 January 1982.

The Spanish royal couple had been received in New Delhi by the Neelam Sanjiva Reddy and the-then Indian Prime Minister Indira Gandhi, before travelling south to Madras. The visit formed part of the diplomatic relationship between Spain and India, while Irene's presence in Madras gave the royal party a personal connection with the city.

Irene's connection with the Gandhi family later extended beyond the diplomatic context of the Spanish royal visit. Irene was a personal friend of the Gandhi family. Irene was in India when former Indian prime minister Rajiv Gandhi was assassinated.

Irene also remained close to Mahadevan and as his health declined, he dictated his memoirs to her. She subsequently maintained an association with the Dr. T. M. P. Mahadevan Foundation in Madras, which continued aspects of his academic and cultural work and published his writings. The Greek royal family's biography identifies Irene as a vice-president of the foundation and records her support for educational and cultural projects, including the development of an international library. Mahadevan's academic career was closely connected with the University of Madras. He became head of its Philosophy Department in 1943 and, when the department was developed into the Centre for Advanced Study in Philosophy in 1964, became its first director. He was recognised for his work on Advaita Vedanta and Indian philosophy, and was awarded the Padma Bhushan in 1967. He continued writing and teaching after his retirement from the university and was appointed a National Professor in 1982. Mahadevan died on 5 November 1983.

=== Cattle relief and humanitarian work in India ===
Irene's Indian experiences also influenced her humanitarian work, particularly her efforts to transfer surplus livestock from Europe to communities where the animals could provide a source of food and income. Irene recalled that one of her first major cattle initiatives took place in 1984, while she was studying comparative philosophy in India. She said that people had challenged her for concentrating on books when families in the country were experiencing hunger. This encounter helped turn her attention towards practical relief work.

Irene also recalled arranging for 400 cows to be transported to India for distribution to 400 families. She said that she travelled on the aircraft with the animals because she was concerned about their welfare during the journey. The flight lasted approximately fourteen hours, and on arrival, the animals were welcomed by local people, who placed garlands around their necks and applied traditional marks to their foreheads. Irene explained that the intention was to provide families with productive dairy animals rather than simply deliver short-term assistance. The cows could supply milk and contribute to the livelihoods of the households that received them.

The initiative reflected Irene's concern about the disposal of surplus livestock in wealthier countries and the needs of communities facing poverty. She later explained that European dairy cattle could produce considerably more milk than many local Indian breeds, and that transferring the animals could benefit families who needed a dependable source of milk. Her approach combined animal welfare with humanitarian assistance: rather than treating surplus cattle as an agricultural problem to be disposed of, she sought to place them in communities where they could remain productive.

A further cattle initiative was discussed in the Indian Parliament in 1986. In a written answer in the Lok Sabha on 5 May 1986, the Indian government confirmed that it had accepted an offer from Irene to donate approximately 20,000 cows, to be obtained from countries belonging to the European Economic Community. The National Dairy Development Board was to coordinate the arrangements. The parliamentary record also referred to a separate pilot project involving 1,000 cows from West Germany. The parliamentary answer establishes that the offer had been accepted and arrangements were being considered; it should not be taken as evidence that all 20,000 animals were ultimately transported to India.

Irene's work with cattle continued through later projects. One subsequent initiative involved the donation of 100 pregnant Holstein-Friesian heifers to the Indian government. These animals became the foundation herd of the Animal Breeding Centre at Salon in Uttar Pradesh, which was established in April 1988. The centre's history describes the importance of the initial herd to its development. This later project illustrates the continuation of Irene's interest in using livestock transfers to support agricultural development in India.

== Philanthropy ==
Irene devoted much of her life to humanitarian and charitable activities, particularly through her organisation World in Harmony (Mundo en Armonía), which she founded in 1986 and subsequently led as its president. The organisation sought to address poverty and hunger by redistributing surplus agricultural produce and livestock from industrialised countries to communities in need. Its activities also encompassed animal welfare, education and social assistance. Irene's approach was influenced by her experiences of poverty in Greece and India, and she advocated providing assistance through cooperation and equality rather than paternalism.

Irene began developing the idea for World in Harmony during the mid-1980s, after becoming concerned about the quantities of surplus food produced in developed countries while other regions experienced shortages. In April 1986, she explained that the organisation intended to facilitate the transportation of surplus food to countries and communities where it was needed, including India and Ethiopia, as well as disadvantaged areas in Spain and Greece. She also emphasised the importance of making sure that humanitarian assistance was provided on an equal basis rather than through paternalistic arrangements.

The organisation's first public fundraising activity was a benefit concert by the Young Orchestra of the European Community, held at the Teatro Real in Madrid on 16 April 1986. The proceeds were intended to support people with disabilities in Spain and provide food assistance to India. The initiative attracted support from private companies and other contributors, and marked the beginning of the organisation's humanitarian activities.

One of Irene's principal humanitarian initiatives involved redirecting surplus livestock from European agricultural production to countries where the animals could contribute to food security and rural livelihoods. In 1989, she travelled to Cantabria in northern Spain to select 80 Friesian cows for transportation to Bangladesh. The project formed part of World in Harmony's efforts to promote livestock farming and agriculture in developing countries as a means of combating hunger and providing employment.

In 1992, Irene had organised the transportation of 72 surplus cows from Cantabria to India aboard an aeroplane in 1989. The animals had been surplus to the requirements of local dairy farmers. Her organisation sought to make productive use of livestock that might otherwise be disposed of, providing communities with sources of milk and agricultural assistance. Earlier that year, the Polytechnic University of Madrid donated 3.1 million pesetas to World in Harmony. The money had been raised through a concert performed by the Russian Radio and Television Orchestra at Madrid's National Auditorium on 28 November 1991. At the time, the organisation was also involved in distributing surplus agricultural and livestock products from industrialised countries to regions affected by hunger. Its activities included rehabilitation and social reintegration programmes for people experiencing drug addiction, using occupational therapies at rural centres and farms.

In December 1993, Irene presented the organisation's activities in Valencia, explaining that it sought to transfer food surpluses from developed countries to communities with greater needs, while encouraging cooperation between different societies. At the time, the organisation was working to overcome administrative restrictions on the distribution of surplus food across international borders.

Among its relief operations was assistance to the former Yugoslavia, where the organisation sent enriched biscuits, infant food and 17,000 blankets. A further shipment of 8,000 blankets was being prepared at the time of the announcement. The organisation worked with corporate supporters and local contributors to coordinate the collection and distribution of humanitarian supplies.

The livestock initiatives also continued beyond India and Bangladesh. In 1990, amid the preparations for the Gulf War, Irene arranged for hundreds of cows and their calves to be transported from India to Jordan after the country's western borders were closed. Their milk was used to provide nourishment for children in Jordan during the conflict. The initiative formed part of her wider efforts to combine animal welfare with practical assistance to communities experiencing shortages of food.

Over the following decades, World in Harmony expanded its activities internationally. In 2020, the organisation was working in approximately 30 countries and had promoted projects in Vietnam, Afghanistan, Equatorial Guinea and Haiti, among others. Irene also donated her inheritance to the organisation, which continued to support humanitarian initiatives in different parts of the world.

In its later years, the organisation also supported educational and social projects, including the establishment of schools and medical centres in parts of Africa and South Asia. Its activities extended to India and Spain, reflecting the geographical range of Irene's longstanding humanitarian interests.

In 2004, she established the Gina Bachauer Awards in collaboration with the Friends of Music Society and the Athens Concert Hall. Sponsored by World in Harmony, the awards sought to support young musicians by providing opportunities for further study with established instructors and performances in Athens and Madrid.

World in Harmony ceased operations on 31 December 2023, after supporting more than 150 projects over a period of 37 years. Its closure followed Irene's declining ability to oversee the organisation's activities.

== Personal life ==
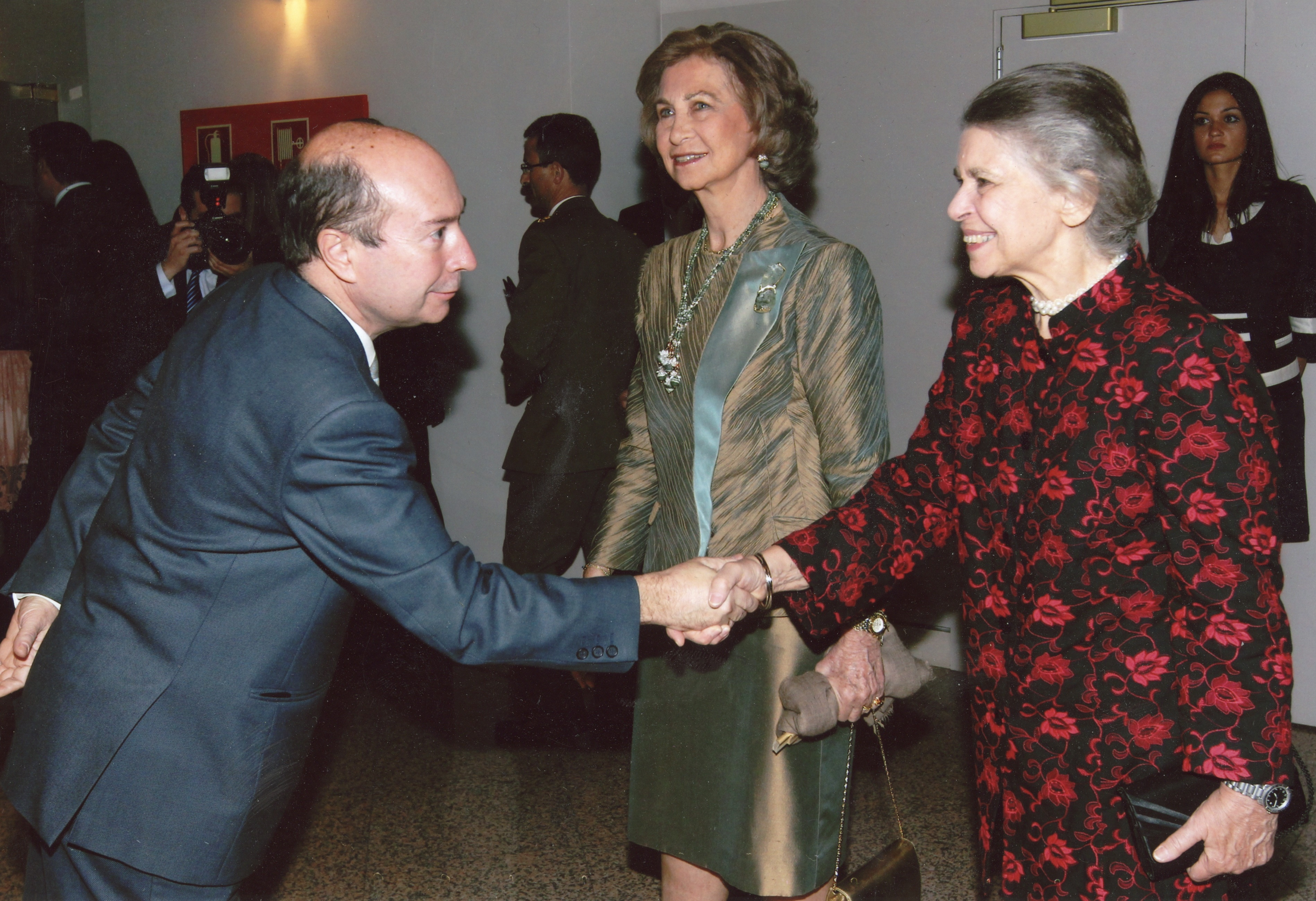
Irene with Queen Sofía in 2018

Irene never married and had no children. She regarded her unmarried status as a personal choice rather than a disappointment, once explaining that some people were fortunate to marry while others were fortunate not to, and that she considered remaining single to be her own good fortune. She also said that she had not regretted not having children, explaining that her interests and unconventional outlook had led her towards a different kind of life. Although she rarely discussed her romantic life publicly, she acknowledged to her biographer, Eva Celada, that she had been in love. When Celada asked her about her relationships, Irene replied: "Do not ask me about my love affairs; they involve third parties and I do not wish to harm anyone." It is rumoured she had experienced several romantic attachments and attracted the interest of men from European royal and aristocratic circles, notably Gonzalo de Borbón y Dampierre, a cousin of Juan Carlos I of Spain, and Jesús Aguirre, who later married Cayetana Fitz-James Stuart, 18th Duchess of Alba. However, Irene did not publicly identify her partners or confirm the details of the stories, and accounts of her private relationships remain inconsistent.

Irene was particularly close to her elder sister, Sofía, with whom she shared interests in music, culture and intellectual discussion. The two sisters remained close throughout their lives, and Irene lived for many years in an apartment at the Palace of Zarzuela in Madrid, near Sofía's private quarters. She was also closely involved in the lives of her nephews and nieces, who affectionately called her "Tía Pecu", a shortened form of peculiar. Her nephews and nieces regarded her as a trusted family figure, and she was particularly close to Infanta Cristina, whose daughter, Irene Urdangarin, was named after her. Irene also spoke warmly of her nephew Felipe VI of Spain, praising his sense of humour and interest in intellectual discussion.

Her musical interests remained important throughout her life, and she continued to support young musicians through charitable initiatives. She also developed an interest in archaeology and participated with Sofía in excavations at the ancient settlement of Decelea in Greece. The sisters worked with archaeologist Theophanó A. Arvanitopoulou and contributed two essays on their archaeological interests.

Irene also pursued philosophical and literary interests. She translated philosophical texts from English into Greek and Spanish and informally assisted with the revision of works associated with the Indian philosopher Jiddu Krishnamurti. Her years in India had influenced her interest in Hindu philosophy, spirituality and meditation, and she maintained an interest in Eastern religious traditions after returning to Europe. She was also interested in paranormal phenomena, occultism, parapsychology and the possibility of extraterrestrial life. Her interests in unidentified flying objects and other unexplained phenomena were shared to some extent by Queen Sofía. She was also interested in ancient civilisations, including Maya culture.

After the death of her father, King Paul, Irene adopted a vegetarian, later vegan diet. She also practised yoga and meditation. Her concern for animals was also reflected in her humanitarian work and her support for projects involving animal welfare. She was known for her unconventional approach to royal life and her preference for a relatively simple lifestyle, despite her royal background.

Her personal style reflected her experiences abroad and her preference for comfort over formal royal fashion. During her years in India, she became accustomed to wearing saris, and after returning to Europe she frequently wore loose trousers, colourful blouses, shawls and Nehru-style jackets. She favoured bright colours, flowing fabrics and paisley and African-inspired patterns. She generally avoided conspicuous luxury clothing, elaborate accessories and prominent jewellery, although she occasionally wore pieces from the Greek royal family's collection at formal occasions. She was often seen wearing flat shoes and keeping her hair in a simple low bun. Her relaxed appearance and individual approach to dress contributed to her family's affectionate nickname for her, "Tía Pecu".

In 2000, Irene donated a selection of rare books and archaeological objects from the Greek royal family's collection to the Benaki Museum in Athens, contributing to the preservation of the family's cultural holdings and Greek heritage.

== Later life ==
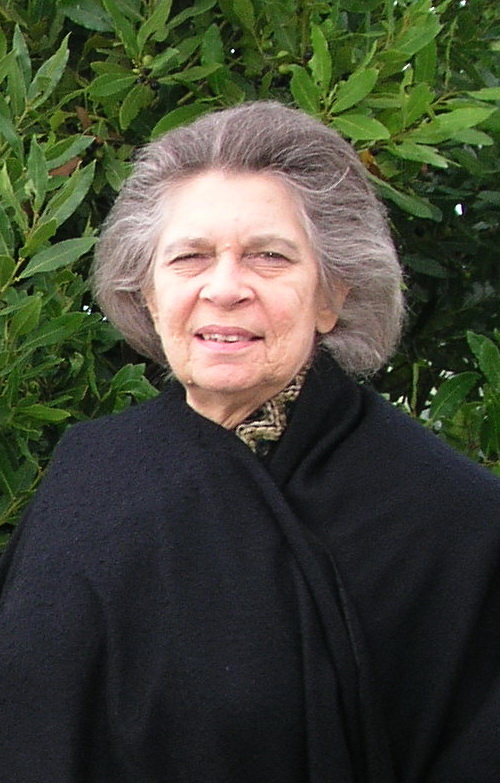
Irene in 2008

In 2002, together with her brother, the former King Constantine II, and their paternal aunt, Princess Katherine, Irene was awarded compensation by the European Court of Human Rights after it ruled that the Greek government had violated their property rights by confiscating the family's private estates without compensation. The Court awarded Constantine €12 million, Irene €900,000 and Katherine €300,000, in addition to legal costs. Irene donated the entirety of her compensation to charitable causes through her humanitarian organisation, World in Harmony (Mundo en Armonía), while Constantine used part of his award to establish the Anna Maria Foundation, dedicated to preserving the cultural heritage of Greece.

Irene continued her charitable activities through World in Harmony, which supported humanitarian, educational and cultural projects in several countries. Its work included assistance to disadvantaged communities, educational programmes, support for young musicians and initiatives promoting animal welfare. In 2004, she established the Gina Bachauer Awards in collaboration with the Friends of Music Society and the Athens Concert Hall. Sponsored by World in Harmony, the awards provided opportunities for young musicians to receive further musical training and perform in concerts in Athens and Madrid.

In 2007, her biography, Irene of Greece, the Rebel Princess, written by Eva Celada, was published. The book drew on interviews with Irene and explored her life, interests and humanitarian activities.

On 23 April 2008, Irene became the godmother of Simeon-Hassan of Bulgaria, the son of Prince Kardam of Bulgaria and his wife, Miriam Ungría. The ceremony took place at the Saint John of Rila Church at Tsarska Bistritsa, the Bulgarian royal family's residence. Mohammed VI of Morocco served as the child's godfather, while Irene represented the Greek royal family at the baptism.

Irene remained closely involved with her family and maintained a particularly close relationship with her sister, Queen Sofía of Spain, with whom she lived at the Palace of Zarzuela in Madrid. She also maintained ties with the Greek royal family and continued to be associated with charitable and cultural activities in Greece. Through World in Harmony, she supported projects involving education, social assistance and the preservation of cultural traditions. The organisation reported that it had supported more than 150 projects internationally during its 37 years of activity. It ceased operations on 31 December 2023.

On 16 March 2018, Irene obtained Spanish nationality by royal decree and renounced her Greek nationality. The decision was published in Spain's Boletín Oficial del Estado on 3 April 2018. The decree granted her Spanish nationality by naturalisation, recognising her longstanding personal connections with Spain and the Spanish royal family.

=== Health ===
In 2002, Irene was diagnosed with breast cancer and underwent chemotherapy treatment, from which she made a full recovery. She subsequently resumed her charitable and cultural activities and continued to reside with her sister, Queen Sofía, at the Palace of Zarzuela in Madrid. Although she maintained a largely private life, Irene regularly accompanied Queen Sofía at official, charitable and religious engagements in Spain and abroad, and remained one of her closest advisers and companions.

The final years of Irene's life were marked by declining health and the loss of close members of her family. In January 2023, she attended the funeral of her elder brother, Constantine II of Greece, in Athens, one of her last major public appearances with the Greek royal family. Despite increasing frailty, she also attended memorial services held in his honour. In November 2023, it was publicly disclosed that Irene was suffering from cognitive impairment, which progressively affected her memory, speech and mobility. Nevertheless, she continued to accompany Queen Sofía at selected family occasions whenever her health permitted.

In 2024, Irene attended the funeral of her cousin, Prince Michael of Greece and Denmark, before making her final public appearance at the wedding of her nephew and godson, Prince Nikolaos of Greece and Denmark, in Athens in February 2025. During the summer of 2025, her condition deteriorated significantly, leading her to withdraw completely from public life. Queen Sofía subsequently reduced and adapted her programme of official engagements in order to remain by her sister's side, spending much of her time caring for Irene at the Zarzuela Palace during her final months.

== Death ==
On 13 January 2026, it was announced that Irene's condition had become critical, prompting Queen Sofía to cancel all of her official engagements to remain with her. Irene died at the Palace of Zarzuela in Madrid at 11:40 a.m. (CET) on 15 January 2026, aged 83, following a prolonged period of declining health.

Following Irene's death, members of the Greek royal family paid tribute to her as a devoted sister, aunt and family figure. Her nephew, Pavlos, Crown Prince of Greece, shared a personal tribute describing Irene as a woman of "quiet strength", "deep faith" and devotion to her family. He wrote that she had been a source of wisdom, loyalty and love, and a steady presence within the family throughout her life. Pavlos also expressed that her memory would remain with the family and that she would be reunited with those she had loved. The Serbian royal family also paid tribute to Irene, reflecting the close relationship between the Greek and Serbian royal houses. Crown Prince Alexander of Serbia described Irene as "a great and kind woman" and "a true and honest friend", recalling decades of friendship between their families. He also highlighted Irene's humanitarian cooperation with Crown Princess Katherine, particularly their joint charitable work assisting children in India during the 1980s.

Following private services at the Palace of Zarzuela, Irene's body, escorted by the Royal Guard, was transferred to the Cathedral of St Andrew and St Demetrius in Madrid, where a memorial service was held on 17 January 2026. The service was attended by members of the Spanish royal family, including Queen Sofía of Spain, King Felipe VI, Queen Letizia, Leonor, Princess of Asturias, Infanta Sofía, Infanta Elena, Infanta Cristina, and Infanta Margarita with her husband Carlos Zurita. Following the private requiem, the cathedral was opened to members of the public wishing to honour Irene before her remains were transferred to Greece.

The following day, Irene's remains were transported to Athens, where she lay in repose at the Church of St Eleutherius beside the Metropolitan Cathedral of Athens. On 19 January 2026, her funeral service was held at the Metropolitan Cathedral, attended by her sister Queen Sofía of Spain, King Felipe VI, Queen Letizia, Princess Leonor and Infanta Sofía, alongside members of the former Greek royal family, including Pavlos, Crown Prince of Greece, Prince Nikolaos of Greece and Denmark, and Prince Philippos. Representatives of other European royal families, including the Serbian royal family, also attended the ceremony. Irene was subsequently interred at the Royal Cemetery at Tatoi, alongside her parents and brother.

=== Posthumous recognition ===
On 13 November 2026, Irene was posthumously awarded the Grand Cross of the Institution of Humanitarian Merit (Gran Cruz del Mérito Humanitario) by Spain's Institution of Humanitarian Merit, in recognition of her charitable and humanitarian work. Her sister, Sofía, accepted the distinction and its accompanying Diploma of Honour on her behalf during a ceremony at the Zarzuela Palace in Madrid.

== Notable published works ==
- En Decelia: fragmentos cerámicos de Decelia y miscelánea arqueológica. Athens (1959–1960). Spanish translation from the Greek published in Spain, 2013. ISBN 9788494103308.

== Honours ==
=== National ===
- Kingdom of Greece:
  - Knight Grand Cross of the Royal Order of the Redeemer
  - Dame Grand Cross, Special Class of the Royal Order of Saints Olga and Sophia
- Denmark: Knight of the Order of the Elephant (RE; 11 September 1964)

=== Foreign ===
- House of Bourbon-Two Sicilies: Dame Grand Cross of Justice of the Sacred Military Constantinian Order of Saint George (1962)
- Italy: Grand Cross of the Order of Merit of the Italian Republic (27 November 1962)
- Thailand: Knight Grand Cordon of the Order of Chula Chom Klao (14 February 1963)

== Ancestry ==
Ancestors of Princess Irene of Greece and Denmark

8. George I, King of the Hellenes
4. Constantine I, King of the Hellenes
9. Grand Duchess Olga Constantinovna of Russia
2. Paul, King of the Hellenes
10. Frederick III, German Emperor
5. Princess Sophia of Prussia
11. Victoria, Princess Royal
1. Princess Irene of Greece and Denmark
12. Ernest Augustus, Crown Prince of Hanover
6. Ernest Augustus, Duke of Brunswick
13. Princess Thyra of Denmark
3. Frederica of Hanover
14. Wilhelm II, German Emperor
7. Princess Victoria Louise of Prussia
15. Princess Augusta Victoria of Schleswig-Holstein-Sonderburg-Augustenburg

Princess Irene of Greece and Denmark House of Schleswig-Holstein-Sonderburg-Glücksburg Cadet branch of the House of Oldenburg Born: 11 May 1942 Died: 15 January 2026
Greek royalty
Preceded by Constantine as Crown Prince	Heir-presumptive to the Greek throne 1964–1965	Succeeded by Princess Alexia
