= Frederica of Hanover =

Queen of Greece from 1947 to 1964

Frederica
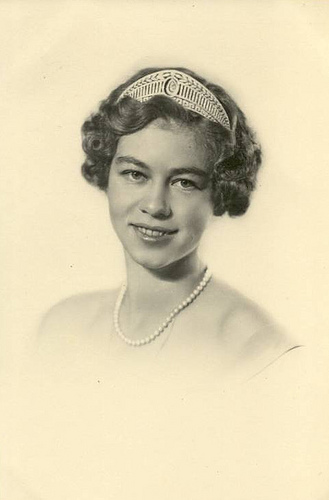
- Frederica, 1930s

Queen consort of the Hellenes
- Tenure: 1 April 1947 – 6 March 1964
- Born: 18 April 1917; Blankenburg (Harz), Duchy of Brunswick, German Empire
- Died: 6 February 1981 (aged 63); Madrid, Spain
- Burial: 12 February 1981; Royal Cemetery, Tatoi Palace, Greece
- Spouse: Paul of Greece (m. 1938; died 1964)
- Issue: Sofía, Queen of Spain; Constantine II, King of Greece; Princess Irene
Names
- Friederike Luise
- House: Hanover
- Father: Ernest Augustus, Duke of Brunswick
- Mother: Princess Victoria Louise of Prussia

Frederica of Hanover (German: Friederike Luise; Greek: Φρειδερίκη Λουΐζα, romanized: Phreideríkē Louḯza; 18 April 1917 – 6 February 1981) was Queen of Greece from 1 April 1947 until 6 March 1964 as the wife of King Paul and Queen Mother of Greece from 6 March 1964, when her son Constantine II became King, until 8 December 1974, when the monarchy was officially abolished after a referendum.

Granddaughter of Kaiser Wilhelm II and daughter of Duke Ernest Augustus of Brunswick, Frederica was born a few months before the fall of the German Empire. Her family overthrown, she grew up between Austria and Weimar Germany, where her father owned large properties. As a teenager, she joined the Hitler Youth in 1933, before leaving to complete her studies for the next two years in the United Kingdom and then Italy. In Florence, she was received by Princess Helen of Greece and Denmark, at whose house she met the Crown Prince of Greece, Paul. The two fell in love and married two years after the restoration of the monarchy in Greece. In the years that followed, she gave birth to three children, Sophia in 1938, Constantine in 1940 and Irene in 1942.

During the Second World War, Greece was occupied by the Axis powers. The Greek royal family left the country and Frederica and her children settled first in South Africa and from 1943 in Egypt. The changing political situation in Greece, with the rise of the EAM and the KKE, challenged the institution of the monarchy. The royal family did not return to the country until 1946, when the Greeks ratified the return and restoration of the institution in a referendum. In the period of civil war that followed, Frederica developed a strong social activity to support the efforts of the government and the Crown. She organised a network to help refugees affected by the forces of the Democratic Army, creating the so-called "children's towns", an initiative that was widely criticised by opponents of the Crown.

After the death of Paul I in 1964, the dowager queen retired from public life. However, according to the prevailing historiographical view, she continued to influence the fate of the country through her son, now King Constantine II. Frederica was widely regarded as Constantine's éminence grise and continued to be attacked by the opposition, who blamed her for the tensions between the palace and the government of Georgios Papandreou (1964–1965).

== Early life ==
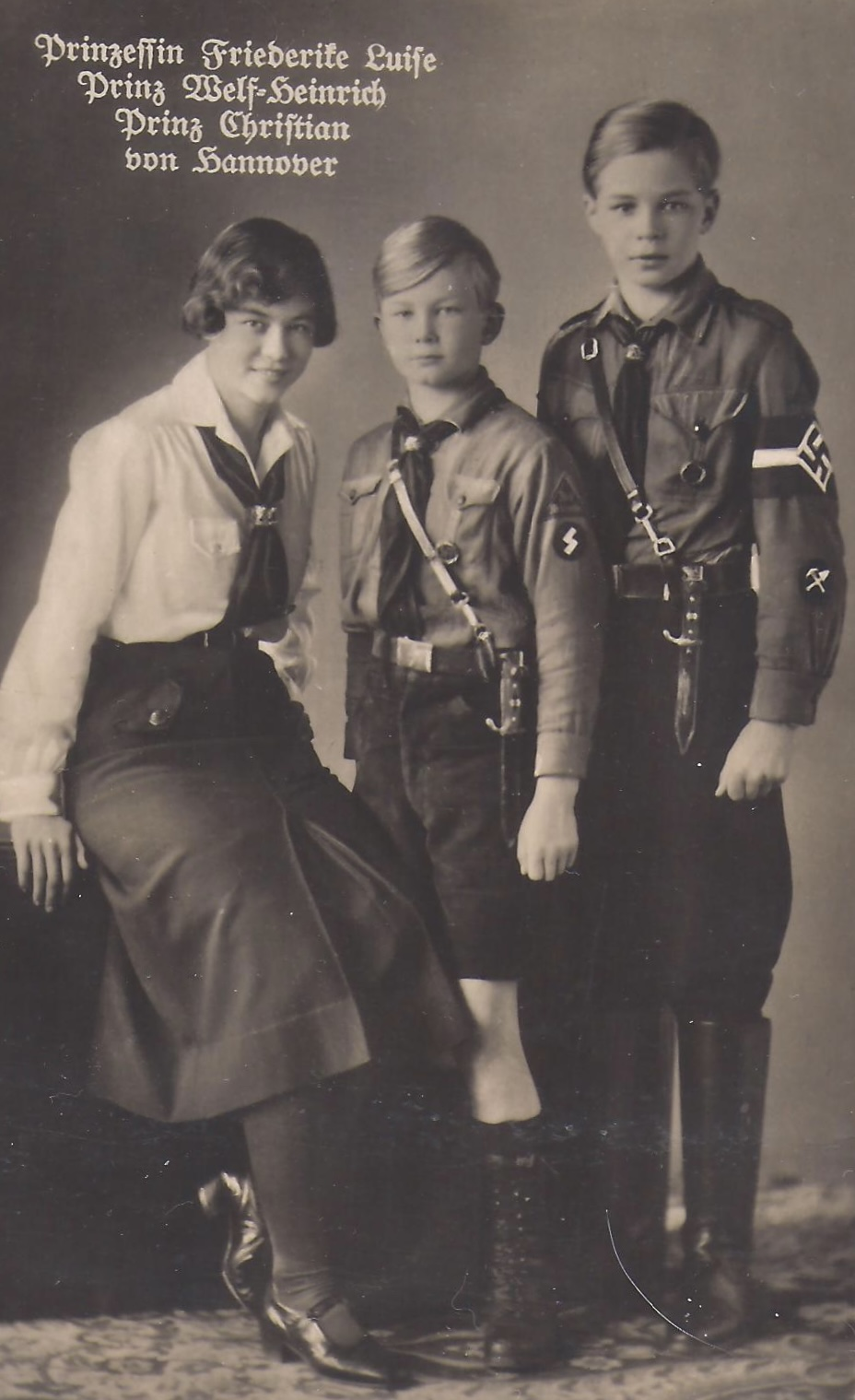
Frederica with her brothers Christian and Welf Heinrich in uniforms of Nazi Youth organizations, c. 1933-1934

Born Her Royal Highness Friederike Luise, Princess of Hanover, Princess of Great Britain and Ireland, and Princess of Brunswick-Lüneburg on 18 April 1917 in Blankenburg am Harz, in the German Duchy of Brunswick, she was the only daughter and third child of Ernest Augustus, then reigning Duke of Brunswick, and his wife Princess Viktoria Luise of Prussia, herself the only daughter of the German Emperor Wilhelm II. Both her father and maternal grandfather abdicated their thrones in November 1918 following Germany's defeat in World War I, while her paternal grandfather had been stripped of his British royal dukedom the previous year.

In 1933 Frederica joined the Jungmädelbund, the Nazi organisation for girls aged 10–14. Although it is not entirely clear whether this was of her own volition or not, in her autobiography, "Measure of Understanding", she states: "One day two women in uniform appeared in my parents' room and my parents told me to come out. It had become a law that all children had to register with the Nazi Youth Movement and the women had come to remind my parents of this duty.(...)I didn't like wearing the uniform, and I never liked it later, but I saw it as something that had finally brought me into contact with other children. (...) My father didn't like the Nazi movement, but he couldn't discuss it openly. After two weeks in the youth movement I had a long private talk with my father. He explained to me what the whole uniform thing really meant, and we decided together that it would be better for me to cut all ties with it. But since I was in Germany, that would have been impossible under the law. So I was sent to England." In 1934, Adolf Hitler, in his ambition to link the British and German royal houses, asked for Frederica's parents to arrange for the marriage of their seventeen-year-old daughter to the Prince of Wales. In her memoirs, Frederica's mother described that she and her husband were "shattered" and such a possibility "had never entered our minds". Victoria Louise herself had once been considered as a potential bride for the very same person prior to her marriage. Moreover, the age difference was too great (the Prince of Wales was twenty-three years Frederica's senior), and her parents were unwilling to "put any such pressure" on their daughter.

To her family, she was known as Freddie.

== Marriage ==
Prince Paul of Greece proposed to her during the summer of 1936, while he was in Berlin attending the 1936 Summer Olympics. Paul was a son of King Constantine I and Frederica's great aunt Sophia. Accordingly, they were maternal first cousins once removed. They were also paternal second cousins as great-grandchildren of Christian IX of Denmark. Their engagement was announced officially on 28 September 1937, and Britain's King George VI gave his consent pursuant to the Royal Marriages Act 1772 on 26 December 1937. They married in Athens on 9 January 1938. Frederica became Hereditary Princess of Greece, her husband being heir presumptive to his childless elder brother, King George II.

During the early part of their marriage, they resided at a villa in Psychiko in the suburbs of Athens. Ten months after their marriage, their first child, the future Queen Sofía of Spain (and future mother of Felipe VI), was born on 2 November 1938. On 2 June 1940, Frederica gave birth to the future King Constantine II.

According to several accounts, she had an affair with CIA director, Allen Dulles, after meeting him in 1958.

== War and exile ==
At the peak of World War II, in April 1941, the Greek royal family was evacuated to Crete in a Sunderland flying boat. Shortly afterwards, the German forces attacked Crete. Frederica and her family were evacuated again, setting up a government-in-exile office in London.

In exile, King George II and the rest of the Greek royal family settled in South Africa. Here Frederica's last child, Princess Irene, was born on 11 May 1942. The South African leader, General Jan Smuts, served as her godfather. The family eventually settled in Egypt in February 1944.

After the war, the 1946 Greek referendum restored King George to the throne. The Hereditary Prince and Princess returned to their villa in Psychiko.

== Queen consort ==
On 1 April 1947, George II died and Frederica's husband ascended the throne as Paul I, with Frederica as queen consort. A Communist insurgency in Northern Greece led to the Greek Civil War. The King and Queen toured Northern Greece under tight security to appeal for loyalty in the summer of 1947.

Queen Frederica was constantly attacked for her German ancestry. Left-wing politicians in Greece repeatedly used the fact that the Kaiser was her grandfather, and that she had brothers who were members of the SS, as propaganda against her. She was also criticized variously as "very Prussian" and "was a Nazi". When she was in London representing her sick husband at the wedding of his first cousin Prince Philip of Greece and Denmark to King George VI's elder daughter Princess Elizabeth in November 1947, Winston Churchill remarked on the Kaiser being her grandfather. Queen Frederica had replied acknowledging the fact, but reminding him that she was also descended from Queen Victoria, and that her father would be the British king if the country had operated under Salic Law (allowing only males to inherit the crown). In fact, Frederica held the title Princess of the United Kingdom of Great Britain and Ireland, granted ad personam to the children of the then-Duke of Brunswick by George V's letters patent of 1914, which remained unrevoked.

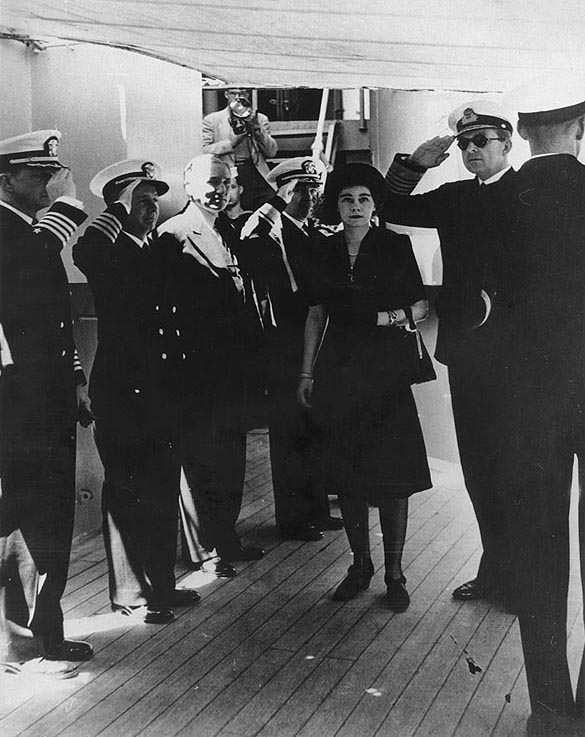
Queen Frederica with King Paul, while visiting the USS Providence (CL-82), at Athens, circa May 1947

Queen Frederica's personal standard

During the civil war, Queen Frederica set up the Queen's Camps or Child Cities (translation of: Παιδο(υ)πόλεις / Paidopoleis or Paidupoleis), a network of 53 camps around Greece where she would rescue children of members of the Democratic Army and former partisans.

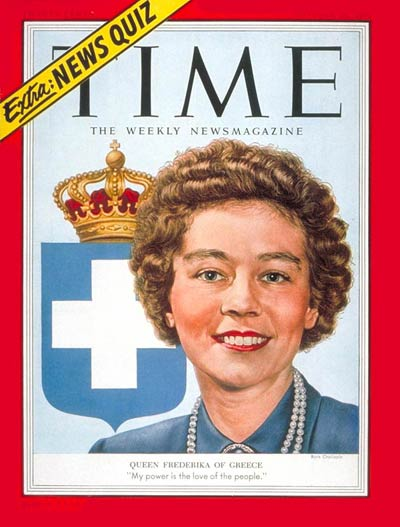
On the cover of Time, 1953

The Greek Civil War ended in August 1949. The King and Queen took this opportunity to strengthen the monarchy, and paid official visits to Marshal Josip Broz Tito in Belgrade, Presidents Luigi Einaudi of Italy in Rome, Theodor Heuss of West Germany, and Bechara El Khoury of Lebanon, Emperor Haile Selassie I of Ethiopia, Governor-General Chakravarthi Rajagopalachari of India, King George VI of the United Kingdom, and the United States as guest of President Dwight D. Eisenhower. However, at home in Greece and abroad in the United Kingdom, Queen Frederica was targeted by the opposition, because as a girl she had belonged to the Bund Deutscher Mädel (League of German Girls), a branch of the Hitler Youth group for young women; her supporters argued that evading membership in the group would be difficult under the existing political climate in Nazi Germany at the time.

Unlike her meek husband, in post-War Greece Frederica was one of the most hated public figures. This was due to a string of reasons that included her political interference, her intemperate character, her German ethnicity, and the fact she became identified in the public consciousness with all that was reactionary. Frederica has been described as "inherently undemocratic". She was notorious for her numerous arbitrary and unconstitutional interventions in Greek politics and clashes with democratically elected governments. She actively politicked against the election of Alexander Papagos. At home in Greece and abroad in the United Kingdom, she was targeted by the opposition. In 1963 while visiting London, rioting by Greek leftists demonstrating against the situation with the political prisoners of the Greek Civil War, forced her to temporarily seek refuge in a stranger's house. Her political interference was harshly criticized and was a significant factor in the strengthening of republican sentiments.

Frederica's 16 November 1953 appearance in Life as America's guest was taken on one of the many state visits she paid around the world. Also that year she appeared on the cover of Time. On 14 May 1962, her eldest daughter Sofía married Prince Juan Carlos of Spain (later King Juan Carlos I of Spain) in Athens.

== Queen dowager ==
On 6 March 1964, King Paul died of cancer at the age of 62, after seventeen years on the Greek throne. His son, Constantine II, succeeded him, and Frederica became queen dowager. She was 46 years old and had spent the previous seventeen years as queen consort. On 18 September 1964, Constantine married Princess Anne-Marie of Denmark in Athens, who became Queen of Greece. Frederica subsequently stepped back from most of her official duties, allowing Anne-Marie to assume a more prominent position in the royal household. She continued to attend family occasions and remained involved in the upbringing of her children and grandchildren.

Following Paul's death, Frederica lived principally at her villa in Psychiko, a suburb of Athens, with her younger daughter, Princess Irene. Her life became quieter and less centred on official engagements, although she continued to see Constantine and Anne-Marie regularly. She remained close to her son, who frequently visited her residence. Their relationship attracted considerable attention because Frederica was believed by many of Constantine's political opponents to retain considerable influence over the young king. She was repeatedly accused of acting as an éminence grise behind the throne, exercising influence without holding an official political position. The accusations became a recurring feature of press coverage of the royal family during Constantine's reign.

Although Frederica had withdrawn from most public duties, she remained a controversial figure in Greek society. Her political interventions during Paul's reign, her outspoken anti-communism and her defence of the monarchy's prerogatives had alienated sections of the political left and other critics of the royal household. Her involvement in the establishment and administration of the Queen's Camps during the Greek Civil War had also attracted criticism. Some opponents regarded her as having exercised political influence beyond the appropriate role of a constitutional queen, while others objected to the royal family's privileges and expenditure. Her strong personality and continued closeness to Constantine meant that she remained a prominent target of criticism even after she had ceased to be queen consort.

The political crisis of 1965 further damaged the monarchy's standing. In July, Prime Minister Georgios Papandreou resigned following a dispute with Constantine over control of the Ministry of National Defence. The disagreement developed into a constitutional crisis, known in Greece as the Apostasia or the July Events, and was followed by a succession of unstable governments and widespread demonstrations. Although Constantine was the central figure in the dispute, Frederica was also accused by political opponents of influencing her son's decisions and encouraging the palace to resist Papandreou's government. Her close relationship with Constantine reinforced the perception that she continued to exercise political influence despite her formal withdrawal from public responsibilities.

During this period, Frederica continued to devote much of her time to her family. Constantine and Anne-Marie's first child, Princess Alexia, was born on 10 July 1965 at Mon Repos on Corfu. Their second child, Crown Prince Pavlos, was born on 20 May 1967. Frederica also maintained contact with her elder daughter, Sofía, who lived in Spain with her husband, Juan Carlos, and their children. Irene continued to live with her mother in Greece and accompanied her on family visits and other journeys.

Frederica also maintained her relationship with her mother, Victoria Louise of Prussia, during her years as queen dowager. Victoria Louise lived in Germany, and the two remained connected through their family relationship and visits. Their relationship had experienced difficulties during earlier years, but they continued to be in contact.

In December 1966, the government introduced legislation extending protection against lèse-majesté to members of the royal family, including the queen dowager. The proposal was controversial because critics considered it an attempt to protect the royal household from press criticism. A proposed annual allowance of approximately US$100,000 for Frederica also attracted negative attention. She asked the government to withdraw the proposal, explaining that she did not wish to provoke further criticism of the monarchy. Her decision was reported in the international press as an attempt to avoid another controversy over royal expenditure.

=== Coup ===
On 21 April 1967, a group of army officers led by Colonel Georgios Papadopoulos seized power in a military coup, overthrowing the civilian government and establishing a dictatorship. The coup began during the night and took the royal family by surprise. On the evening before the takeover, Frederica and Princess Irene had been at Tatoi with other members of the family before returning to their residence in Psychiko. Princess Sofía, who was visiting her mother, had also spent part of the evening with the family. Constantine remained at Tatoi, where he was awakened during the early hours by news that military forces were surrounding the royal residence and attempting to enter the property.

As the coup unfolded, Constantine attempted to contact his mother and sisters and arrange for them to come to Tatoi. However, the military had surrounded the estate with tanks, while telephone communications across the country were progressively cut. The king was unable to bring Frederica and Irene to safety before the military had established control of the situation. The Tatoi estate was isolated, and the royal family became subject to the new regime's surveillance and restrictions. The military takeover therefore affected Frederica directly, even though she had not been holding an official political position at the time.

A later account of the coup describes a tank being stationed outside Frederica's residence in Psychiko. According to this account, an officer told her that she was not permitted to leave the house, supposedly for her own protection. Frederica reportedly objected to the restriction and confronted the officer.

Following the coup, the junta maintained close surveillance over the royal family and restricted its public activities. Official ceremonies were kept to a minimum, and the family's movements and communications were subject to military scrutiny. Despite the new regime's control, Constantine initially remained king and the monarchy was formally retained. Frederica continued to live in Greece with Irene, but her freedom of movement and public activity were affected by the political situation.

The new regime's relationship with Constantine deteriorated over the following months. The king opposed the dictatorship and became increasingly concerned about the military's consolidation of power and the removal of officers loyal to the Crown. On 13 December 1967, he attempted a counter-coup intended to remove the military government and restore constitutional authority. Frederica and the other members of the royal family accompanied him as the plan unfolded. The attempt failed, and the military regime remained in power. The royal family left Greece by air, travelling to Rome, where they began their second period of exile. Frederica's departure brought to an end her life in Greece as queen dowager, after more than two decades in the country as a member of the royal family.

== Exile and India ==
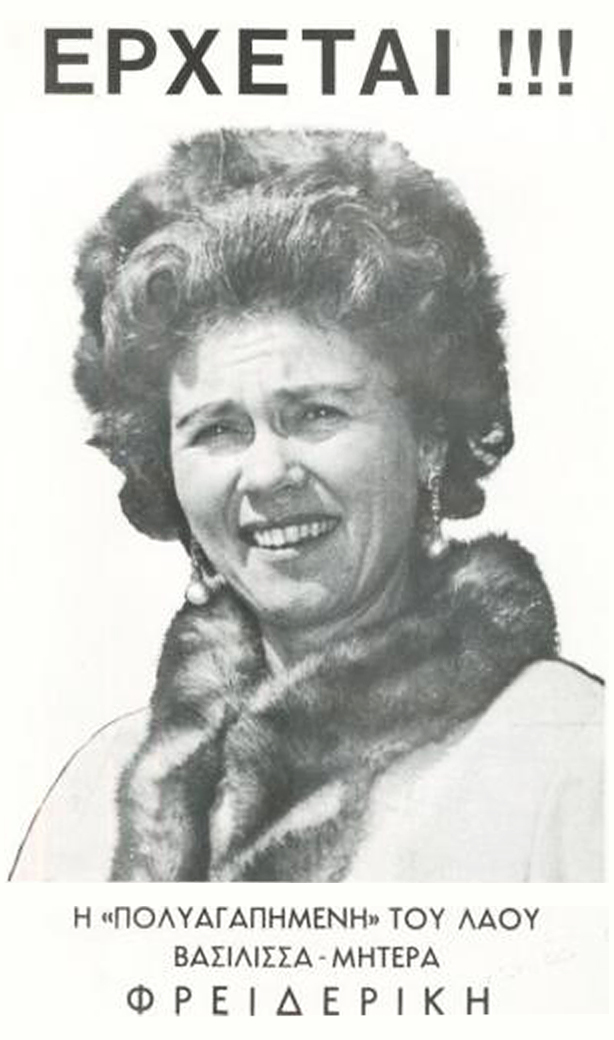
"COMING!!! The people's 'beloved' queen mother Frederica". Anti-monarchy poster of Queen Frederika from the 1974 referendum.

Following the failed counter-coup of her son, Constantine, on 13 December 1967, Frederica left Greece with the royal family and went into exile. She initially settled in Rome, Italy, where she lived with her younger daughter, Irene. The family initially lived in Rome, where Frederica and Irene occupied a large residence on the outskirts of the city. The household was smaller, with fewer servants and a reduced staff, and Frederica's daily life was no longer organised around the ceremonies and official engagements of the Greek court. The family occasionally ate at local restaurants and maintained a quieter routine while living abroad. Frederica also continued to see members of the former royal family and received visitors from the international royal and diplomatic circles.

The military government initially retained the monarchy in name, but the king and his family were unable to return to Greece. Frederica was particularly affected by the loss of her former position and the country in which she had spent most of her adult life. She nevertheless continued to pursue her personal interests, particularly her growing interest in philosophy and spirituality, which had begun several years earlier.

Her interest in India had developed before the family's exile. In 1963, she had accompanied King Paul and their children on an official visit to India. During the visit, the royal family travelled to several parts of the country, visited religious and historical sites, and met Indian officials, including Prime Minister Jawaharlal Nehru. Frederica's later interest in Indian philosophy developed from these earlier experiences and from her subsequent meetings with Indian religious teachers and scholars.

In 1971, Frederica published her autobiography, A Measure of Understanding, through Macmillan. The book covered her childhood in Germany, her marriage to Prince Paul, her years in Greece and her experiences during the Second World War and the Greek Civil War. It also reflected her developing interest in religion, meditation and philosophy. The publication gave Frederica an opportunity to present her own account of her life and the experiences that had shaped her outlook.

On 1 June 1973, the military government formally abolished the Greek monarchy. Frederica consequently lost her position as queen mother, although she continued to be known by the title. The dictatorship ended in July 1974, but the monarchy was not restored. In the referendum held on 8 December 1974, the Greek electorate voted to retain a republic. Frederica remained abroad and increasingly devoted her time to India, where she pursued her interest in Hindu philosophy and religious study.

=== India ===
Frederica's connection with India became one of the defining features of her life during exile. Her interest in Indian philosophy had developed during the 1960s, and she had already visited the country several times before establishing a longer residence there. She was particularly interested in Hindu philosophy, meditation and the teachings of Indian spiritual figures. Her younger daughter, Princess Irene, shared these interests and accompanied her on many of her visits.

In June 1966, Frederica met the Indian philosopher and academic T. M. P. Mahadevan in Athens during an international conference on world religions. Mahadevan was a professor of philosophy at the University of Madras and an authority on Indian philosophical traditions, particularly Advaita Vedanta. Their meeting introduced Frederica to his academic work and strengthened her interest in studying Indian philosophy. Irene also became acquainted with Mahadevan and later studied under his guidance.

In December 1966, Frederica and Irene travelled to India together. They visited the Kanchi Sankaracharya, Sri Chandrasekharendra Saraswati, in Kalahasti. Both women had already been practising meditation and had become acquainted with Advaita Vedanta through the teachings of Ramana Maharshi. Frederica had read several books about Maharshi and was particularly interested in visiting the ashram associated with him at Tiruvannamalai.

During the same journey, Frederica and Irene visited Sri Ramanasramam at Tiruvannamalai. Frederica insisted that the ashram be included in their travel programme, despite the arrangements normally made for royal visitors. She had studied Maharshi's teachings before arriving and was deeply interested in the spiritual atmosphere of the place. The January 1967 issue of The Mountain Path, the ashram's journal, recorded their visit and published a photograph of Frederica and Irene with members of the ashram. The account described Frederica as having read the books about Ramana Maharshi carefully before her arrival and noted the strong attachment that both women developed to the ashram.

Following their initial visits, Frederica and Irene continued to travel to India. Their interest in the country developed beyond occasional visits, and both became increasingly involved in the study of Indian religion and philosophy. During the following years, Frederica spent extended periods in Madras, now Chennai, where she was able to pursue these interests more fully.

In August 1973, Frederica and Irene began studying at the Centre for Advanced Studies in Philosophy at the University of Madras, where Mahadevan was director. Frederica became particularly interested in Advaita Vedanta, a philosophical tradition concerned with the relationship between the individual self and ultimate reality. She studied Indian religious thought and the teachings of the philosopher Adi Shankara, whose writings had become central to her spiritual interests. Irene also pursued her studies under Mahadevan, concentrating on comparative religion and Indian philosophy.

Frederica became increasingly attracted to the idea of spiritual unity and the belief that material possessions were less important than spiritual understanding. She was particularly interested in the philosophy of oneness associated with Advaita Vedanta. Rather than treating Indian philosophy as an academic subject alone, she sought to incorporate its principles into her own life. Her interest was reflected in her writing and in the time she devoted to meditation, religious study and visits to spiritual centres.

The Indian philosopher and spiritual teacher Sri Aurobindo also became an important influence on Frederica. She was interested in his writings and in the philosophical ideas associated with his teachings. Her interest in Indian spirituality therefore extended beyond a single religious institution or teacher and included several different traditions of Indian thought. She spent much of her time studying, meditating and visiting religious institutions. Her lifestyle became more private and centred on her philosophical interests. Irene shared much of this life with her, and the two travelled together to places associated with Indian spirituality.

In January 1973, Frederica and Irene returned to Sri Ramanasramam at Tiruvannamalai. Their visit was recorded in the April 1973 issue of The Mountain Path. They visited Arunachala, Skandashram and Virupaksha Cave, as well as the Arunachaleswara Temple. Their continued association with the ashram demonstrated that their interest in Ramana Maharshi's teachings had become a lasting part of their lives rather than a temporary interest developed during a single visit.

Frederica's presence in India also coincided with the development of closer relations between India and Spain, particularly through the Spanish royal family. Her eldest daughter and son in law, Sofía and Juan Carlos, later met Indira in 1974 and 1982.

Frederica's connection with India also brought her closer to the country's religious and cultural communities. She and Irene visited temples and ashrams, met religious teachers and continued their study of Indian philosophy. Their interest in the teachings of Ramana Maharshi remained particularly strong. The two women were also associated with the academic environment surrounding Mahadevan at Madras, whose teaching played an important role in their understanding of Advaita Vedanta.

=== Relationship with Sofía ===
Frederica also remained close to her elder daughter, Queen Sofía of Spain. Following Sofía's marriage to Juan Carlos in 1962, Spain became an important family destination. After Juan Carlos became king in November 1975, Sofía became queen consort, and Frederica maintained her connection with the Spanish royal household. Although she spent substantial periods in India, she continued to visit her daughter and grandchildren in Spain.

In February 1974, Juan Carlos and Sofía visited India, where they undertook official engagements and met Indian leaders, including Prime Minister Indira Gandhi. The visit took place while Frederica was spending time in Madras and reflected the growing diplomatic relationship between Spain and India. The family's personal connection with the country through Frederica and Irene was an important part of this relationship.

In 1976, Sofía and her children travelled to India to visit Frederica, who was reportedly in delicate health at the time. Sofía's visits to India were part of the family's continuing connection with the country, which had become an important place in Frederica's life. While Irene shared her mother's interest in India and philosophy, Sofía had established her own family and royal responsibilities in Spain. Frederica consequently divided her time between her life in Madras and visits to her daughter in Madrid. Her former role as queen mother had ended with the abolition of the monarchy, but she remained an important figure within the family.

== Death and funeral ==
In February 1981, Frederica travelled from India to Spain to visit her daughter, Queen Sofía, and her family. Frederica arrived in Madrid on 1 February 1981 and stayed at the Zarzuela Palace, the residence of the Spanish royal family. Her visit was intended as a family stay with Sofía, Juan Carlos and her grandchildren, Felipe, Elena and Cristina.

Her final public appearances included being photographed with Juan Carlos at Madrid-Barajas Airport on 5 February. She had also accompanied her grandson Felipe to the airport earlier in the week when he travelled to join his parents. At the time, Sofía and Juan Carlos were spending a short holiday at the Baqueira Beret ski resort in the Pyrenees. They returned to Madrid after being informed of Frederica's sudden illness and death.

On the afternoon of 6 February 1981, Frederica underwent an operation at the Clínica La Paloma in Madrid to remove xanthelasma from one of her eyelids. Xanthelasma is a condition in which small yellowish deposits of cholesterol develop beneath the skin, commonly around the inner corners of the eyelids. The deposits are generally harmless, although they can be removed surgically for cosmetic or other personal reasons. Frederica's procedure was intended to remove the deposits affecting her eyelids.

The operation was performed by the Spanish surgeon Dr Vilar Sancho and lasted approximately one hour and 45 minutes. Dr Carlos Zurita, a physician who was married to Infanta Margarita of Spain, was also present at the clinic. After the procedure, Frederica regained consciousness as the effects of the anaesthetic wore off and spoke for several minutes with Dr Vilar Sancho and Dr Zurita. According to Dr Vilar Sancho's account to El País, she appeared to have recovered from the operation before suddenly suffering a myocardial infarction approximately two hours after the procedure. The doctors attempted to resuscitate her, but their efforts were unsuccessful. She was transferred to the Zarzuela Palace, where she died at approximately 11:30 p.m. on 6 February, aged 63.

The suddenness of Frederica's death attracted considerable attention because she had not been known to be seriously ill before the operation. Newspapers variously described the cause of death as a heart attack, heart failure or myocardial infarction.

At the time of her death, Frederica's three children were living in different countries. Sofía was in Spain with Juan Carlos and their children, while Constantine and his wife, Anne-Marie, were living in London. Irene, who had continued her connection with India and had spent time there with her mother, was in Bombay. Constantine was informed of his mother's death in London and travelled to Madrid, while Irene travelled from India to join the family. The family subsequently gathered at the Zarzuela Palace before making arrangements for Frederica's funeral and burial in Greece.

Frederica's death came less than two months after that of her mother, Victoria Louise of Prussia. Victoria Louise, the only daughter of Wilhelm II, German Emperor, and Augusta Victoria, had died in Hanover on 11 December 1980, aged 88. Frederica had attended her mother's funeral in December. The two had remained connected throughout Frederica's life, and Victoria Louise's death preceded her daughter's own by only 57 days.

=== Aftermath ===
News of Frederica's death prompted an immediate response from the Spanish royal household and government. The Spanish royal family received condolences from political leaders, members of other European royal families and members of the public. The volume of telephone calls to the Zarzuela Palace was so great that its telephone lines became overwhelmed. Telegrams of condolence arrived from political figures and reigning royal houses, and a book of condolences was made available for members of the public to sign. Adolfo Suárez, the Spanish prime minister, returned to Madrid to personally convey his condolences to Sofía and the royal family. The Spanish government declared three days of official mourning, from 9 to 11 February, during which the national flag was flown at half-mast on public buildings and naval vessels.

On 7 February, a religious service for Frederica was held at the Zarzuela Palace according to the Greek Orthodox rite. A further funeral service was held at the Zarzuela Palace on 9 February, also following the Greek Orthodox rite. Among the foreign royal guests were King Baudouin and Queen Fabiola of Belgium and members of the Bulgarian royal family. The service was conducted as a private family ceremony before Frederica's body was transported to Greece. The Spanish government and other state institutions also formally conveyed their condolences to the royal family during the period of mourning.

=== Funeral and burial ===
Following the services in Spain, the family requested that Frederica be buried in Greece beside her husband, King Paul, who had died in 1964. The proposed burial at Tatoi, the former royal summer estate and family burial ground north of Athens, became a political issue. The Greek monarchy had been abolished following the restoration of democracy in 1974, and the former royal family had remained in exile since 1967. Frederica had been a particularly controversial figure in Greek political life because of her influence during the reigns of Paul and Constantine and her involvement in the political affairs of the post-war period. Her association with the monarchy and the Greek Civil War had left her with strong supporters as well as opponents.

The government of Prime Minister Georgios Rallis agreed to the family's request to bury Frederica at Tatoi. The decision was criticised by the opposition, particularly the Panhellenic Socialist Movement, led by Andreas Papandreou, and the Greek Communist Party. Papandreou described the decision as a serious political mistake, arguing that Frederica was associated with painful memories of earlier political events. Communist representatives also objected to allowing the former royal family to return to Greece for the funeral, arguing that the ceremony risked giving renewed prominence to the abolished monarchy. The controversy demonstrated that, although Frederica had been living outside Greece for more than thirteen years, her political reputation remained divisive.

The Greek government insisted that the funeral should remain a private family occasion rather than become a political gathering. It imposed strict security measures around Tatoi and limited the number of people permitted to attend. The authorities restricted access to the estate, established police cordons and excluded most journalists and television cameras from the ceremony. Only a small number of journalists were eventually permitted to cover the event. The government also prohibited demonstrations and organised gatherings in the area in an effort to prevent confrontations between royalist supporters and opponents of the monarchy. The restrictions reflected official concern that the funeral might become a public demonstration in favour of Constantine's return or the restoration of the monarchy.

Constantine was granted permission to return to Greece for the funeral, his first visit to the country since the royal family's departure in 1967. However, the permission was limited to approximately six hours. The arrangements meant that he and the other members of the former royal family would have to leave Greece shortly after the ceremony. The decision to restrict his stay attracted international attention, particularly because he was returning to bury his mother in the country where he had once been king. The Greek government also arranged for the coffin to be transported from Madrid aboard an official Greek aircraft, which was to land at the military airfield at Tatoi rather than at Athens International Airport.

On 12 February 1981, Frederica's coffin was flown from Madrid to Greece. The party travelling with it included Constantine, Anne-Marie, Sofía, Irene and members of the younger generation of the Greek royal family. Juan Carlos travelled separately from Spain to attend the funeral. Other members of European royal families also travelled to Greece, including Prince Philip, Duke of Edinburgh, Queen Juliana of the Netherlands and Prince Henrik of Denmark. The coffin was covered with the Greek royal flag and carried by eight pallbearers. At the airport, Constantine knelt, crossed himself and kissed the ground, a gesture widely reported by the international press as he returned to his homeland for the first time in more than thirteen years.

Despite the restrictions, the funeral attracted considerable public attention. Approximately 1,000 royalist supporters gathered near the police cordon at Tatoi, many of them carrying photographs of Frederica and Constantine and waving olive branches. Some broke through the police barrier and shouted slogans calling for Constantine's return and the restoration of the monarchy. Police had established roadblocks to prevent larger crowds from reaching the estate, while the government feared that royalist supporters might clash with opponents of the former queen. Constantine appealed for calm so that the funeral could proceed. The gathering demonstrated the continued affection for Frederica and the former royal family among sections of the Greek population, while also illustrating the political divisions that surrounded her public legacy.

The funeral was held at the royal cemetery at Tatoi, within the grounds of the former royal estate. Frederica was buried beside King Paul, fulfilling her wish to be laid to rest with her husband. The ceremony was conducted according to the Greek Orthodox tradition and attended by members of the Greek royal family and their European relatives. Following the burial, the family departed Greece in accordance with the restrictions imposed on their visit. Constantine's brief return and the tightly controlled nature of the ceremony became a prominent part of the international coverage of Frederica's funeral.

== Honours ==
Styles of Queen Frederica of Greece
- Reference style: Her Majesty
- Spoken style: Your Majesty

- Denmark: Knight of the Order of the Elephant
- Italy: Knight Grand Cross of the Order of Merit of the Italian Republic
- Thailand: Dame Grand Cordon with Chain of the Order of the Royal House of Chakri

== Ancestry ==
Ancestors of Frederica of Hanover

8. George V of Hanover
4. Ernest Augustus, Crown Prince of Hanover
9. Princess Marie of Saxe-Altenburg
2. Ernest Augustus, Duke of Brunswick
10. Christian IX of Denmark
5. Princess Thyra of Denmark
11. Princess Louise of Hesse-Kassel
1. Frederica of Hanover
12. Frederick III, German Emperor
6. Wilhelm II, German Emperor
13. Victoria, Princess Royal
3. Princess Victoria Louise of Prussia
14. Frederick VIII, Duke of Schleswig-Holstein
7. Princess Augusta Victoria of Schleswig-Holstein-Sonderburg-Augustenburg
15. Princess Adelheid of Hohenlohe-Langenburg

== See also ==
- Descendants of Christian IX of Denmark – Lists members of European royalty sharing a mutual ancestor with Frederica of Hanover

Frederica of Hanover House of Hanover Cadet branch of the House of Welf Born: 18 April 1917 Died: 6 February 1981
Greek royalty
Preceded by Elisabeth of Romania	Queen consort of the Hellenes; 1 April 1947 – 6 March 1964	Vacant Title next held by Anne-Marie of Denmark
