= Hanoverian princess =

List of princesses from George III to the Kingdom of Hanover

This is a list of Hanoverian princesses from the accession of George III to the throne of the Kingdom of Hanover in 1814. Individuals holding the title of princess will usually also be styled "Her Royal Highness" (HRH). Despite Hanover's annexation by Prussia in 1866, male-line descendants of George III continue to style themselves as a prince or princess of Hanover. The eldest daughter of George III, Charlotte, Princess Royal, is not included, as she was married before her father's accession to the throne.

The title Princess of Hanover and the use of the style "Royal Highness" has generally been restricted to the following persons:

- the legitimate daughters of a Hanoverian Sovereign,
- the legitimate male line female descendants of a Hanoverian Sovereign

== List of Hanoverian princesses since 1814 ==
Princess of Hanover by the sovereign
Princess of Hanover from birth
(†) – In Letters Patent dated 20 November 1917, King George V restricted the title of Prince to the children of the sovereign, the children of the sovereign's sons, and the eldest living son of the eldest son of the Prince of Wales.
(‡) – By an Order in Council dated 28 March 1919, as authorized by the Titles Deprivation Act 1917, King George V suspended the British peerage titles, princely dignities and honours of those who sided with Germany in World War I.
– Title in the Kingdom of Hanover
– Title in the United Kingdom

List of Hanoverian Princesses
Name	Born	Died	Royal lineage	Notes
(Kingdom of Hanover) Princess Charlotte (United Kingdom) The Princess Royal; Queen consort of Württemberg	29 September 1766	5 October 1828	1st daughter of King George III	Title held from father's accession to death.
(Kingdom of Hanover) Princess Augusta Sophia (United Kingdom) Princess Augusta Sophia	8 November 1768	22 September 1840	2nd daughter of King George III	Title held from father's accession to death.
(Kingdom of Hanover) Princess Elizabeth (United Kingdom) Princess Elizabeth later, Landgravine of Hesse-Homburg	22 May 1770	10 January 1840	3rd daughter of King George III	Title held from father's accession to death.
(Kingdom of Hanover) Princess Mary (United Kingdom) Princess Mary later, Duchess of Gloucester and Edinburgh	25 April 1776	30 April 1857	4th daughter of King George III	Title held from father's accession to death.
(Kingdom of Hanover) Princess Sophia (United Kingdom) Princess Sophia	25 April 1776	30 April 1857	5th daughter of King George III	Title held from father's accession to death.
(Kingdom of Hanover) Princess Amelia (United Kingdom) Princess Amelia	7 August 1783	2 November 1810	6th daughter of King George III	Title held from father's accession to death.
(Kingdom of Hanover) Princess Charlotte (United Kingdom) Princess Charlotte later, Princess of Saxe-Coburg-Saalfeld	7 January 1796	6 November 1817	Only daughter of King George IV & Granddaughter of King George III	Title held from grandfather's accession to death.
(Kingdom of Hanover) Princess Charlotte (United Kingdom) Princess Charlotte	10 December 1821	4 March 1821	Only daughter of King William & Granddaughter of King George III	Title held from her birth to death.
(Kingdom of Hanover) Princess Victoria; Princess Victoria later Queen of the United Kingdom	24 May 1819	22 January 1901	Only daughter of Prince Edward & Granddaughter of King George III	Title held from her birth to death.
(Kingdom of Hanover) Princess Augusta (United Kingdom) Princess Augusta later, Grand Duchess of Mecklenburg-Strelitz	19 July 1822	5 December 1916	1st daughter of Prince Adolphus & Granddaughter of King George III	Title held from her birth to death.
(Kingdom of Hanover) Princess Mary Adelaide (United Kingdom) Princess Mary Adelaide later, Duchess of Teck	27 November 1833	27 October 1897	2nd daughter of Prince Adolphus & Granddaughter of King George III	Title held from her birth to death.
(Kingdom of Hanover) Princess Frederica (United Kingdom) Princess Frederica later, Baroness von Pawel-Rammingen	9 January 1848	16 October 1926	1st daughter of King George V & Gt-granddaughter of King George III	Title held from her birth to death.
(Kingdom of Hanover) Princess Marie (United Kingdom) Princess Marie	2 December 1849	4 June 1904	2nd daughter of King George V & Gt-Granddaughter of King George III	Title held from her birth to death.

- Princess Marie Louise of Hanover 11 October 1879 – 31 January 1948 Princess of Baden
- Princess Alexandra of Hanover 29 September 1882 – 30 August 1963 Grand Duke of Mecklenburg-Schwerin
- Princess Olga of Hanover 11 July 1884 – 21 September 1958
- Frederica of Hanover 18 April 1917 – 6 February 1981 Queen consort of Greece

Princess	Birth	Death	Lineage	Comments
Princess Marie Louise	1879	1948	Great-great granddaughter of King George III, daughter of Ernest Augustus, Crown Prince of Hanover	Title held from her birth to death. Grand Duchess of Baden 1928–1929.
Princess Alexandra	1882	1963	Great-great granddaughter of King George III, daughter of Ernest Augustus, Crown Prince of Hanover	Title held from her birth to death. Grand Duchess of Mecklenburg-Schwerin 1904–1945.
Princess Olga	1884	1958	Great-great granddaughter of King George III, daughter of Ernest Augustus, Crown Prince of Hanover	Title held from her birth to death.
Princess Frederica	1917	1981	Great great great granddaughter of George III, daughter of Ernest Augustus, Duke of Brunswick	Title held from her birth to death. Queen of the Hellenes 1947–1964.
Princess Marie	1952		Granddaughter of Ernest Augustus, Duke of Brunswick, daughter of Prince Ernest Augustus of Hanover (1914–1987)	Title held from her birth. Countess of Hochberg 1981–present.
Princess Friederike	1954		Granddaughter of Ernest Augustus, Duke of Brunswick, daughter of Prince George William	Title held from her birth.
Princess Olga	1958		Granddaughter of Ernest Augustus, Duke of Brunswick, daughter of Prince Ernest Augustus of Hanover (1914–1987)	Title held from her birth.
Princess Alexandra	1959		Granddaughter of Ernest Augustus, Duke of Brunswick, daughter of Prince Ernest Augustus of Hanover (1914–1987)	Title held from her birth. Princess of Leiningen 1991–present.
Princess Caroline-Luise	1965		Granddaughter of Ernest Augustus, Duke of Brunswick, daughter of Prince Christian Oscar	Title held from her birth.
Princess Saskia	1970		Great-granddaughter of Ernest Augustus, Duke of Brunswick, daughter of Prince Welf Ernst	Title held from her birth.
Princess Mireille	1971		Granddaughter of Ernest Augustus, Duke of Brunswick, daughter of Prince Christian Oscar	Title held from her birth.
Princess Vera	1976		Great-granddaughter of Ernest Augustus, Duke of Brunswick, daughter of Prince Georg	Title held from her birth.
Princess Nora	1979		Great-granddaughter of Ernest Augustus, Duke of Brunswick, daughter of Prince Georg	Title held from her birth.
Princess Alexandra	1999		Granddaughter of Ernest Augustus IV, daughter of Prince Ernst August of Hanover	Title held from her birth.
Princess Eugenia	2001		Granddaughter of Prince Ernest Augustus of Hanover (1914–1987), daughter of Prince Heinrich Julius	Title held from her birth.
Princess Elisabeth	2018		Granddaughter of Prince Ernst August of Hanover (born 1954), daughter of Hereditary Prince Ernst August	Title held from her birth.
