= World in Harmony =

Spanish charitable foundation, 1986–2023

World in Harmony Foundation
- Fundación Mundo en Armonía
- Founded: 4 November 1986
- Founder: Princess Irene of Greece and Denmark
- Dissolved: 31 December 2023
- Type: Charitable foundation
- Purpose: Humanitarian aid, education, environmental conservation, animal welfare and sustainable development
- Headquarters: Madrid, Spain
- Location: Spain
- Region served: Spain, India, Bangladesh, Bosnia and Herzegovina, Brazil, Dominican Republic, Equatorial Guinea, Guinea-Bissau, Madagascar, Mozambique and Nepal

The World in Harmony Foundation (Spanish: Fundación Mundo en Armonía) is a Spanish charitable foundation established in 1986 by Princess Irene of Greece and Denmark. Based in Spain, the foundation promotes humanitarian aid, education, environmental conservation, and intercultural understanding through projects in Spain and abroad, particularly in India. Its name, Mundo en Armonía ("World in Harmony"), reflects its aim of fostering harmony between people, cultures, animals, and the natural environment.

== History ==
=== Foundation ===
Princess Irene of Greece and Denmark had long taken an interest in humanitarian issues before establishing the World in Harmony Foundation in 1986. The idea had been in development for about a year, although Princess Irene had considered creating such an organisation for much longer. She founded the charity with the belief that humanitarian ideals should be accompanied by practical action to combat hunger and poverty. Established in Madrid as Fundación Mundo en Armonía ("World in Harmony"), the organisation was named to reflect Princess Irene's philosophy of promoting harmony between people, cultures and the natural environment. Its first public initiative was a benefit concert by the European Community Youth Orchestra at the Teatro Real in Madrid, the proceeds of which were used to support people with disabilities in Spain and to send food aid to India.

=== Development ===
During the late 1980s and 1990s, the foundation expanded its activities beyond emergency food assistance to promote long-term agricultural and rural development in developing countries. In 1989, the organisation purchased dairy cattle in Cantabria for shipment to Bangladesh as part of a programme designed to strengthen livestock farming, combat hunger and create employment. The foundation continued to broaden its international humanitarian work over the following decades, undertaking projects in Asia, Africa and Latin America with the support of volunteers, private donors and collaborating organisations. Its programmes increasingly focused on sustainable development through agriculture, nutrition, education and environmental conservation rather than short-term relief alone.

== Mission ==
The World in Harmony Foundation was established to promote humanitarian assistance and improve the welfare of vulnerable communities through long-term development projects. Princess Irene founded the organisation with the philosophy that humanitarian ideals should be combined with practical action, launching its first public initiative to raise funds for disabled people in Spain and to send food aid to India.

Over the following decades, the foundation expanded its activities to include education, nutrition, environmental conservation, animal welfare and sustainable development. One of its best-known initiatives involved transporting dairy cattle to India to improve nutrition and provide a sustainable source of milk for disadvantaged children and rural communities.

== Projects ==
=== India ===
India was the principal focus of the World in Harmony Foundation's international humanitarian work. Irene's interest in the country dated from her first visit in 1963 and continued after she settled in Spain, leading to the establishment of projects intended to address hunger and improve living conditions in rural communities.

In 1985, shortly before formally establishing the foundation, Irene began a campaign to save surplus European dairy cattle from slaughter by transporting them to India, where they could provide milk for disadvantaged communities. The initiative continued after the foundation's establishment. In 1989, she personally accompanied a shipment of 72 dairy cows donated by the Government of Cantabria to India. The programme aimed to improve nutrition while providing a sustainable source of income for rural families.

=== Other nations ===
Beyond its principal activities in India, the World in Harmony Foundation carried out humanitarian projects in a number of other countries across Asia, Africa, Europe and Latin America. These included Bangladesh and Nepal in Asia; Equatorial Guinea, Guinea-Bissau, Madagascar and Mozambique in Africa; Bosnia and Herzegovina in Europe; and Brazil and the Dominican Republic in Latin America. The foundation's international work formed part of its wider mission of providing humanitarian assistance and supporting sustainable development initiatives in vulnerable communities.

== Organisation ==
The World in Harmony Foundation was based in Madrid, Spain, where Princess Irene lived and carried out much of her charitable work. The organisation was founded in Madrid in 1986 and operated as a non-profit humanitarian foundation dedicated to supporting people and communities in need through international development projects.

Princess Irene of Greece and Denmark served as founder and president of the foundation throughout its existence, from its creation in 1986 until the cessation of activities in 2023. She personally represented the organisation at fundraising events and public activities, using concerts and cultural events to raise awareness and financial support for its humanitarian projects. In 2006, the Spanish Royal Household described Mundo en Armonía as a voluntary charitable organisation without political or religious affiliation, established to promote the physical, moral and spiritual wellbeing of people without discrimination.

The foundation relied on private donations, supporters and volunteers to carry out its programmes. Fundraising was often organised through cultural events, including benefit concerts involving orchestras and performers in Spain. In 1992, the organisation received a donation from the Polytechnic University of Madrid following a charity concert, with the funds intended to support its humanitarian work combating hunger and assisting disadvantaged communities.

Throughout its existence, Irene remained closely involved with the foundation's activities, which became the main focus of her public and humanitarian work. She continued to serve as its president until announcing the closure of the organisation after 37 years of activity at the end of 2023.

== Closure ==
In late 2023, Princess Irene announced the end of the activities of the World in Harmony Foundation after 37 years of operation. In a letter addressed to supporters, Irene, as president of the organisation, stated that the foundation would cease functioning after 31 December 2023 and expressed her gratitude for the "solidarity and support" it had received throughout its existence.

The closure marked the conclusion of a humanitarian project founded by Princess Irene in 1986 and led by her for almost four decades. Spanish media reported that the decision came after years of dedication to the organisation, which had become the main focus of her charitable activities.

Around the same period, reports also discussed Princess Irene's declining health and cognitive difficulties in her later years. Some publications linked her withdrawal from public activities to her health, although the foundation's closure announcement itself did not give a specific reason beyond the decision to end operations after 37 years.

== Legacy ==
The World in Harmony Foundation represented the central focus of Princess Irene of Greece and Denmark's humanitarian work for almost four decades. Founded in 1986, the organisation reflected her commitment to international aid, animal welfare and support for vulnerable communities. Through its projects, particularly those connected with India, the foundation sought to provide practical assistance and promote sustainable solutions to humanitarian challenges. One of the foundation's most recognised long-term initiatives was its work with dairy cattle, through which Princess Irene attempted to prevent the slaughter of surplus animals and use them to support milk productionrural communities in India. The project became closely associated with her belief that humanitarian work should combine compassion for people and animals with practical assistance.

Following Princess Irene's death in 2026, members of the Greek and Spanish royal families remembered her as a person devoted to helping those in need through her charitable projects. Her relatives highlighted her dedication to social causes and her decades of work through Mundo en Armonía, which became one of the defining aspects of her public life. The foundation's closure in 2023 marked the end of Princess Irene's principal humanitarian organisation after 37 years of activity. Although the organisation ceased operations, its work remained an important part of her legacy as a member of the Greek and Spanish royal families who dedicated much of her life to charitable and humanitarian causes

== See also ==
- Princess Irene of Greece and Denmark
- Greek royal family
