= Carlos Zurita, Duke of Soria =

Carlos Zurita
- Duke of Soria and Hernani
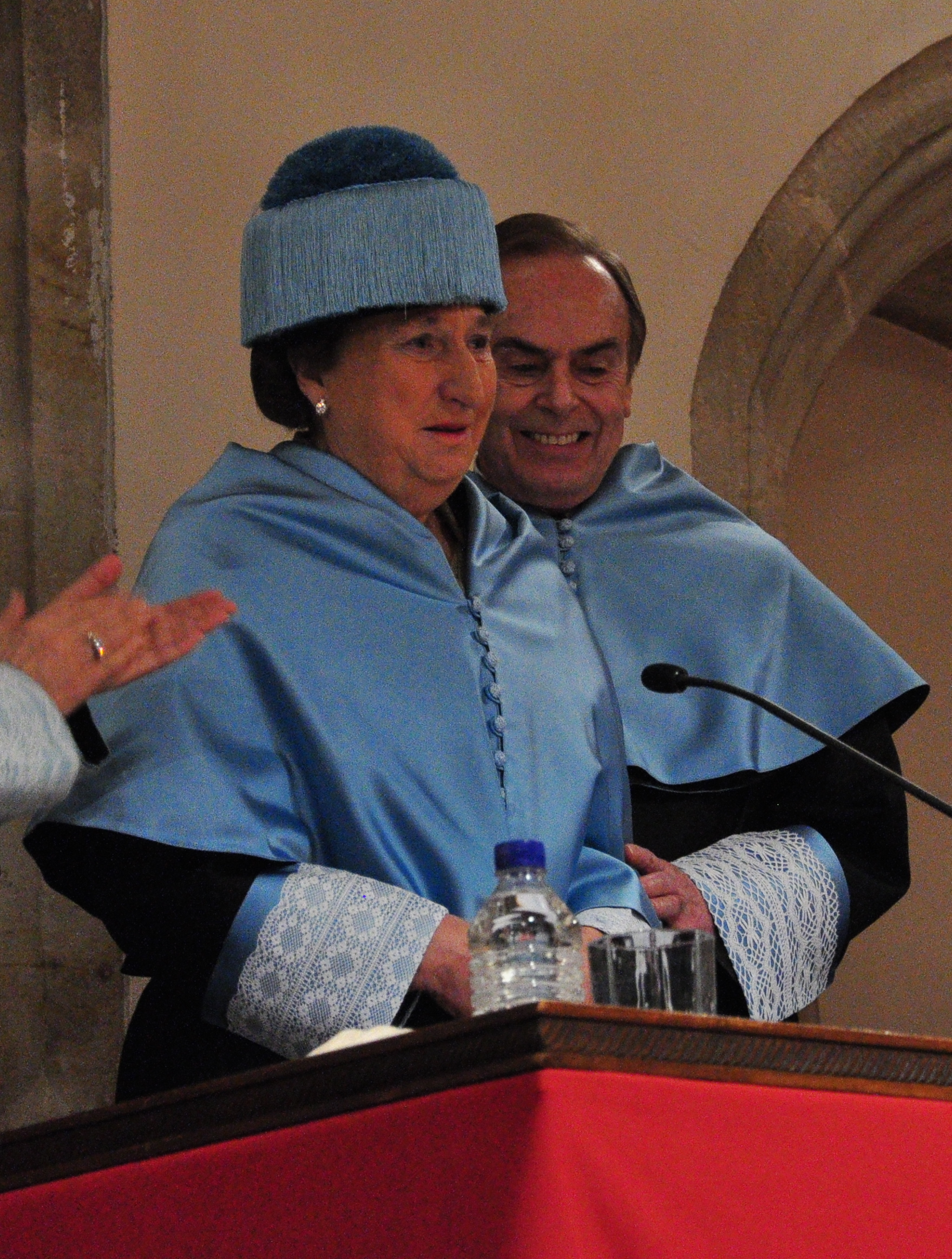
- Carlos and his wife, Margarita, in 2010
- Born: 9 October 1943 (age 82); Antequera, Málaga, Spain
- Spouse: Infanta Margarita, Duchess of Soria (m. 1972)
- Issue: Don Alfonso Zurita y de Borbón; Doña María Zurita y de Borbón
- Carlos Emilio Juan Zurita y Delgado
- Father: Carlos Zurita y González-Vidalte
- Mother: María del Carmen Delgado y Fernández de Santaella

Carlos Emilio Juan Zurita y Delgado, Duke of Soria and Hernani (born 9 October 1943), is a Spanish physician and the husband of Infanta Margarita, Duchess of Soria. He is a brother-in-law of King Juan Carlos I and the uncle of the current Spanish king, Felipe VI.

He was born to aristocrats Carlos Zurita y González-Vidalte and wife María del Carmen Delgado y Fernández de Santaella in Antequera, Málaga, Spain.

The Duke of Soria is a retired medical doctor, as his father, and was a specialist in the respiratory and circulatory system. He studied at the medical faculty of the University of Seville, where he obtained a licentiate in medicine with accompanying award "Premio Extraordinario de Licenciatura" for extraordinary merit in 1967. He received his doctorate with a scholarship at the Spanish College in Bologna, Italy. In 1971, the duke gained the position of teacher service manager of the Spanish National College of the Thorax Illness.

He married Infanta Margarita, on 12 October 1972 in Estoril at St. Anthony's Church. They have two children:

- Don Alfonso Juan Carlos Zurita y de Borbón (b. Madrid, 9 August 1973).
- Doña María Sofía Emilia Carmen Zurita y de Borbón (b. Madrid, 16 September 1975). She has a son, Carlos, born on 28 April 2018 in Madrid.

In 1989, the Duke and the Duchess of Soria created the Fundación Cultural Duques de Soria (The Duke and Duchess of Soria Cultural Foundation), its objective is to stimulate the Spanish language and culture. The Foundation cooperates with universities and Spanish cultural institutions to contribute to the cultural and scientific development in Spain.

The Duke of Soria is President of the Spanish Federation of the Museums Friends Associations and President of the Friends of Prado Museum Foundation. He is also a member of the Spanish Royal Academy of Medicine.

In 2003, the Duke and Duchess of Soria were awarded the Grand Cross of the Order of Alfonso X the Wise for their work in promoting science and culture.

In 2013, Queen Sofia presided over an act of homage to Carlos, for his 25 years at the head of the Friends of the Prado Museum Foundation. The event was attended by his wife, the Infanta Margarita, and his two children, Alfonso and María.

== Honours ==
In 2003, the Duke and Duchess of Soria were appointed Grand Cross of the Order of Alfonso X the Wise of Spain.
