= Duke of Hernani =

Spanish noble title

- Creation date: 11 August 1914
- Created by: Alfonso XIII
- Peerage: Spanish nobility
- First holder: Manfredo de Borbón y Bernaldo de Quirós
- Present holder: Infanta Margarita, Duchess of Soria
- Heir apparent: Alfonso Juan Carlos Zurita y Borbón
- Remainder to: heirs of the body of the grantee according to absolute primogeniture
- Status: Extant

Duke of Hernani (Spanish language: Duque de Hernani) is a hereditary title of Spanish nobility, accompanied by the dignity of Grandee. It was created on 11 August 1914 by King Alfonso XIII in favor of his fourth cousin, Manfredo Luis de Borbón y Bernaldo de Quirós (1889–1979). They are both King Carlos III's great-great-great grandsons.

Manfredo, as son of Luis de Jesús de Borbón y Borbón (1864–1889), 1st Duke of Ánsola and Ana Germana Bernaldo de Quirós, 1st Marchioness of Atarfe (1866–1934), and after the death of his older brother, also inherited his parents' titles, becoming a grandee three times. During his life, Manfredo was an independent politician, member of parliament during the Restoration and the dictatorship of Francisco Franco, as well as governor of the League of Red Cross Societies (today known as the International Federation of Red Cross and Red Crescent Societies), among others.

== Dukes of Hernani ==
1. Manfredo de Borbón y Bernaldo de Quirós, 1st Duke of Hernani, 3rd Duke of Ánsola, 3rd Marquess of Atarfe (1914-1979)
2. Infanta Margarita, 2nd Duchess of Hernani, Duchess of Soria (1981–present)

== Line of succession ==
- Manfredo de Borbón y Bernaldo de Quirós, 1st Duke of Hernani (1889-1979)
- Infanta Margarita de Borbón y Borbón, 2nd Duchess of Hernani (b. 1939)
  - (1). Alfonso Juan Carlos Zurita y Borbón (b. 1973)
  - (2). María Sofía Emilia Zurita y Borbón (b. 1975)
    - (3). Carlos de Zurita y Borbón (b. 2018)

== Legal battle over succession ==
The first holder, Manfredo de Borbon, died childless on 6 January 1979, aged 89. After opening his will, it was made public that Manfredo had designated Infanta Margarita, his distant cousin, as successor to the dukedom. King Juan Carlos I privately approved the succession change by a royal decree in November 1977. As for the duke's fortune, which consisted almost entirely of the old art collection of Infante Sebastián Gabriel de Borbón y Braganza, great-grandson of King Charles III, it was bequeathed to his widow, Teresa Mariátegui y Arteaga.

Both the fortune and the ducal title were claimed by a branch of the Méndez de Vigo family, sons of one of Manfredo's brothers whom his mother had with her second husband. They claimed that the will was false and they accused the royal family of committing "theft, fraud and forgery of Historical Heritage assets". In 1999, the Supreme Court, based on Law 44 of Toro (1505) and the Pragmatic sanction of Charles IV of 1804, ruled that, the owner of a Title of the Kingdom —in this case, Manfredo— is free to designate a successor, with royal authorization, as long as he or she has no offspring.
