= Infanta Margarita, Duchess of Soria =

Spanish infanta (born 1939)

Infanta Margarita
- Duchess of Soria and Hernani
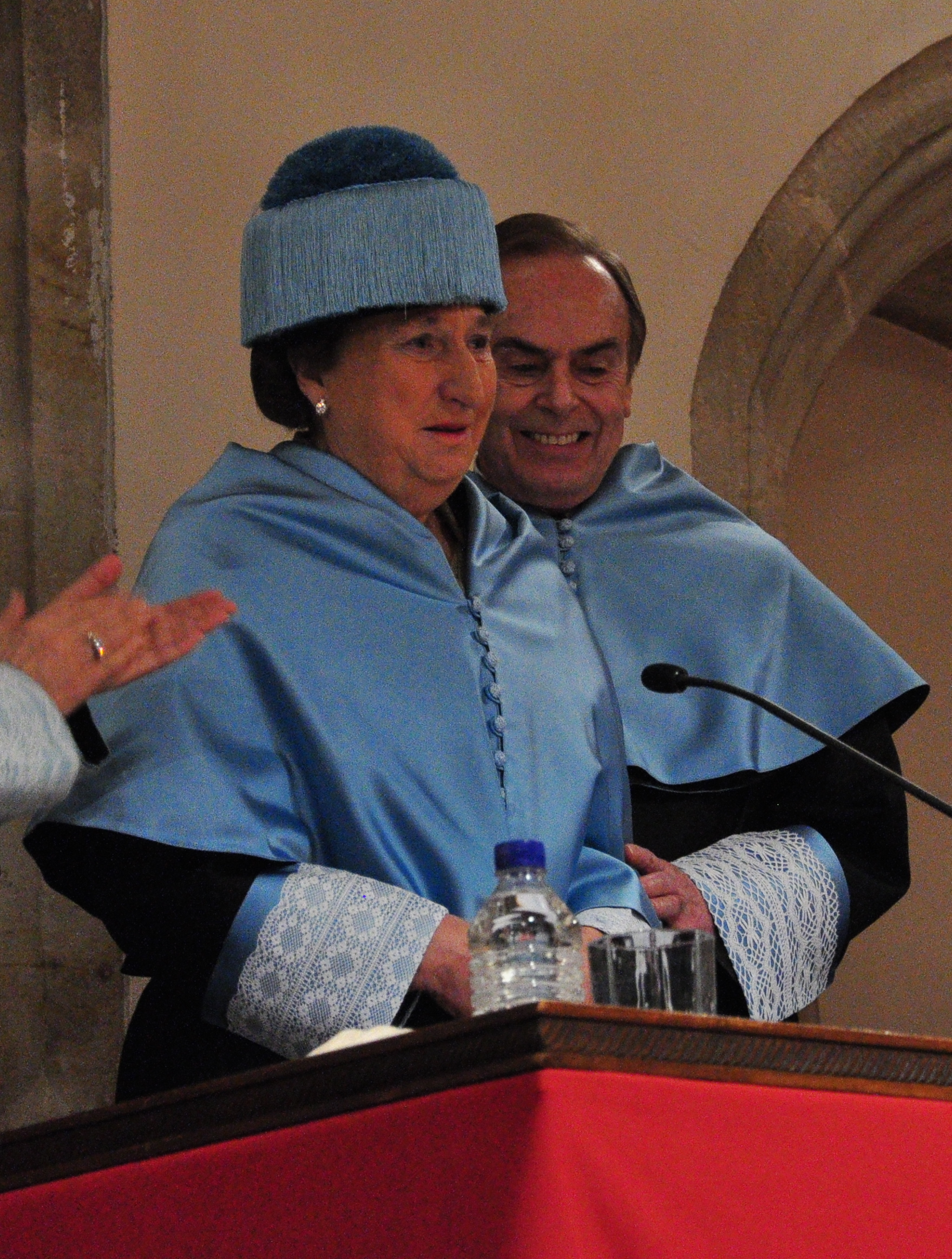
- Margarita with her husband, Carlos, in 2010
- Born: 6 March 1939 (age 87); Rome, Kingdom of Italy
- Spouse: Carlos Zurita y Delgado (m. 1972)
- Issue: Alfonso Zurita y Borbón; María Zurita y Borbón
Names
- Margarita María de la Victoria Esperanza Jacoba Felicidad Perpetua de Todos los Santos de Borbón y Borbón de Las 2 Sicilias
- House: Bourbon-Anjou
- Father: Infante Juan, Count of Barcelona
- Mother: Princess María de las Mercedes of Bourbon-Two Sicilies

Infanta Margarita, Duchess of Soria, 2nd Duchess of Hernani (Margarita María de la Victoria Esperanza Jacoba Felicidad Perpetua de Todos los Santos de Borbón y Borbón; born 6 March 1939), is the younger sister of King Juan Carlos I and aunt of the reigning King Felipe VI of Spain. She is the oldest living Infanta of Spain.

== Early life ==
Infanta Margarita was born at the Hotel Firenze Anglo American in Rome on 6 March 1939, during the exile of the Spanish royal family following the Spanish Civil War. She was the third child and youngest daughter of Infante Juan, Count of Barcelona, and Princess María de las Mercedes of Bourbon-Two Sicilies, following her siblings Infanta Pilar and Infante Juan Carlos, the future King of Spain. Her family had left Spain after the proclamation of the Second Republic in 1931, and she spent her earliest years abroad, first in Italy and later in Portugal. She was baptised shortly after her birth in the Spanish church of Santa María de Montserrat in Rome.

Margarita was born blind, a condition diagnosed in infancy after her family noticed the absence of normal visual responses. Her mother consulted numerous specialists during her early childhood in an unsuccessful attempt to find a cure, even undertaking a pilgrimage to the Sanctuary of Fátima in 1946 in the hope of a miraculous recovery. Her blindness remained permanent and would shape much of her upbringing and public image.

Despite this, she was raised with an emphasis on independence and adaptability. Margarita developed a confident and fearless character from an early age, taking part in activities such as swimming and outdoor pursuits alongside her siblings. She also pursued her education with determination, receiving instruction suited to her condition and developing strong abilities in languages and music. The family eventually settled in Estoril, Portugal, where Margarita spent most of her childhood and adolescence within a close-knit royal household in exile. During these years she maintained a particularly close relationship with her brother Juan Carlos.

By the 1960s, as her brother’s political role in Spain increased under the Franco regime, Margarita began to appear more frequently in social and family contexts connected to the Spanish royal family in exile. Contemporary press descriptions emphasised her outgoing personality and resilience, often noting how she had adapted to her blindness with notable independence. She was regarded as a well-educated and socially active member of the Spanish royal family, having successfully navigated the challenges of her disability while maintaining a visible role within the exiled monarchy.

== Marriage and family ==
Margarita met the orthopedic surgeon Carlos Zurita y Delgado in the late 1960s through mutual friends within Madrid’s social circles. Their relationship developed discreetly, and despite her position within the Spanish royal family, which traditionally adhered strictly to equal marriages, recognizing only unions with other reigning or mediatised dynasties as valid equals, the match was widely regarded as a modern and personal choice, as Zurita did not belong to such a house, but was a respected member of the professional upper class. Their engagement was formally announced in 1972 by the Spanish royal household.

The couple were married on 12 October 1972 at the Palace of Zarzuela in Madrid in a Roman Catholic ceremony. The wedding was attended by numerous members of European royalty, including representatives from the Spanish, Greek, Italian, Bulgarian and Bourbon-Two Sicilies royal families, reflecting the dynastic connections of the House of Bourbon. It was one of the last major royal family events prior to the restoration of the Spanish monarchy in 1975 and attracted significant media attention both within Spain and internationally, symbolising a period of transition for the royal family during the final years of the Franco regime.

Following their marriage, Margarita and Carlos Zurita established their family life in Madrid, maintaining close ties with the Spanish royal household while largely avoiding overt political roles. Despite her blindness, Margarita continued to take on public engagements and charitable work, particularly in support of organisations for people with visual impairments, often accompanied by her husband.

The couple have two children. Their first child, Don Alfonso Juan Carlos Zurita y de Borbón, GE, was born on 9 August 1973 in Madrid. Their second child, Doña María Sofía Emilia Carmen Zurita y de Borbón, GE, was born on 16 September 1975. Her godmother is Queen Sofía of Spain, sister in law to Margarita.

== Duchess of Soria ==
On 23 June 1981, Juan Carlos granted Margarita the right to use the title of Duchess of Soria. The title was not hereditary and could be used by Margarita personally. It was associated with the Castilian city of Soria, which subsequently became the principal focus of much of her cultural and charitable work.

Margarita developed a public role through her association with charitable organisations, particularly those concerned with healthcare, children and people with disabilities. Her involvement with the Spanish Red Cross was among her earliest prominent activities during this period. She participated in the organisation's annual Fiesta de la Banderita, a fundraising event supporting its humanitarian programmes. In May 1984, the Supreme Assembly of the Spanish Red Cross awarded her its Gold Medal in recognition of the work she had carried out over the preceding three years in connection with the fundraising event.

Margarita also became involved in the work of the ONCE, the Spanish National Organisation for the Blind. Her association with the organisation reflected her own experience of blindness and her interest in improving opportunities for people with visual disabilities. On 11 May 1987, she presided over the presentation of prizes for the third school competition organised by the ONCE in Madrid. Approximately 35,000 schoolchildren from the Madrid region had participated in the competition. Her involvement in the event brought attention to the organisation's educational activities and its efforts to promote awareness of visual disability among younger generations.

In September 1988, Margarita was appointed as one of the members of the patronato, or governing board, of the newly established Fundación ONCE para la Cooperación e Integración Social de Personas con Discapacidad. The foundation was created to support the social and employment integration of people with disabilities, including through the development of employment opportunities, vocational training and the removal of architectural and other accessibility barriers. A contemporary report in El País identified Margarita as one of three members appointed to the board independently of the principal organisations represented within it. The other two were Leocadio Marín, president of the Spanish Red Cross, and Francisco Javier Die Lamana, secretary-general of the Royal Board for the Prevention and Care of People with Disabilities.

Her involvement with the ONCE developed further during the following years. In December 1994, she presided over a meeting of the Fundación ONCE's governing board at which its employment and accessibility programmes for the following year were approved. The meeting considered projects intended to create employment for people with disabilities and remove architectural barriers. The foundation reported that, between 1988 and 1994, its programmes had helped create more than 13,000 jobs and occupational placements. Margarita's participation in the meeting demonstrated that her association with the organisation extended beyond ceremonial appearances to involvement in the oversight of its charitable and social objectives.

One of the principal developments associated with Margarita's title was the creation of the Fundación Duques de Soria in 1989. The idea had emerged the previous year, when Margarita and her husband decided that their connection with the city should be expressed through a permanent cultural institution. The foundation was established on 1 March 1989 under the honorary presidency of the Duchess and her husband. Its principal objective was to support Spanish language and culture, encourage international hispanism and promote academic cooperation between universities and research institutions. It was established as a non-profit cultural institution rather than as an organisation devoted to the administration of the ducal title. The foundation's activities extended across a variety of academic disciplines, including literature, history, art, economics, science and the Spanish language. It organised seminars, university courses, exhibitions and meetings involving Spanish and international scholars. Its work was intended to complement existing university programmes and strengthen the international study of Spanish culture. The institution also developed relationships with universities and cultural organisations in Castilla y León and other parts of Spain.

Margarita took part in the foundation's public activities and represented it at academic and cultural events. In March 1994, she presented Juan Carlos with a report reviewing the foundation's work since its establishment. The presentation took place in Salamanca, where her brother addressed the institution and praised the initiative as an example of what could be achieved through sustained cooperation between individuals and institutions.

The foundation also developed an international programme of summer courses and academic meetings. In July 1998, Margarita officially inaugurated its summer courses in Soria. The opening programme included the participation of the writer Francisco Ayala and the artist Antoni Tàpies. Ayala delivered the inaugural lecture on the cultural significance of Don Quixote, while Tàpies's exhibition Resumen sobre papel was presented at the city's Palacio de la Audiencia. The courses were not restricted to Soria, but also included activities in cities such as Salamanca, Valladolid, Barcelona and Madrid, as well as in international locations including Antwerp, Lisbon and Leuven. The foundation's first decade culminated in the establishment of its permanent headquarters at the Convent of La Merced. On 29 November 1999, Juan Carlos attended an event in Soria marking the inauguration of the building as the foundation's headquarters. In his address, he recalled having presided over an earlier meeting of its patronato in 1994 and praised the progress made since its creation.

In addition to her activities in Soria and with the ONCE, Margarita maintained a number of honorary positions in Spanish charitable and cultural organisations. She was president of honour of the Spanish committee of UNICEF, supporting its work on behalf of children's rights and welfare. In this capacity, she attended public events and award ceremonies organised by the organisation. In March 1999, she presented the annual UNICEF journalism awards in Madrid. Twenty-four recipients were recognised for their contributions to public awareness of children's rights and the work of the organisation. The ceremony marked the tenth anniversary of the awards and was attended by representatives of the Spanish media and cultural world. Margarita presented the prizes in her capacity as honorary president of UNICEF España.

Margarita also held the honorary presidency of the Fundación Española del Corazón, an organisation dedicated to promoting cardiovascular health and public awareness of heart disease. In October 1996, she inaugurated the thirteenth Semana del Corazón in Madrid alongside the Minister of Health, José Manuel Romay Beccaría. During the opening event, both took part in blood-pressure and cholesterol measurements, demonstrations intended to encourage visitors to learn about cardiovascular risk factors. The programme included public information and activities concerning the prevention of heart disease.

She was also associated with the Fundación Albéniz, which supported musical education and the promotion of young performers. In November 1990, she attended the presentation of the exhibition Isaac Albéniz y su tiempo in Madrid as president of honour of the foundation. The exhibition explored the life and cultural environment of the Spanish composer Isaac Albéniz and was accompanied by a concert at the Auditorio Nacional featuring works commissioned in his memory. Her participation formed part of her wider support for cultural institutions and artistic initiatives.

Her charitable interests also included organisations supporting people with blood disorders. She was associated with the Spanish haemophilia community and held an honorary role with the Real Fundación Victoria Eugenia, an organisation established to support research and assistance for people affected by haemophilia and related conditions. Her patronage formed part of a wider pattern of involvement in organisations concerned with medical research, patient support and the social consequences of illness.

=== Duchess of Hernani legal proceedings ===
During the 1990s, Margarita was involved in a prolonged legal dispute concerning her succession to the title of Duchess of Hernani, which she had inherited in 1979 following the death of its previous holder, Manfredo de Borbón. The dispute was brought by Francisco Javier Méndez Vigo, Marquess of Atarfe, a nephew of the former duke, who argued that he possessed a superior genealogical claim to the title. He challenged the validity of the arrangement under which Manfredo had designated Margarita as his successor, questioning the legal basis of the royal authorisation that had permitted the designation.

The dispute became public in June 1992, when Méndez Vigo had brought a legal action against Margarita. She maintained that her succession was lawful and argued that the designation had been authorised by Juan Carlos in 1977. The case concerned the interpretation of the rules governing the succession of noble titles and the authority of the monarch to approve the designation of a successor when the holder died without descendants.

In February 1995, the Madrid Provincial Court overturned an earlier first-instance judgment that had ruled against Margarita. The court held that her designation as successor had been made in accordance with the applicable law and that the royal authorisation granted to Manfredo de Borbón to designate a successor was valid. The Marquess of Atarfe continued to challenge the decision, maintaining that his genealogical relationship to the former duke gave him a superior claim.

The case was finally resolved in February 1999, when the Supreme Court rejected the Marquess of Atarfe's appeal and confirmed Margarita's right to the title. The court upheld the validity of the designation made by Manfredo de Borbón with royal authorisation, concluding that Margarita's succession had been lawful. The judgment brought an end to a dispute that had lasted for several years and established a legal precedent concerning the authority of holders of noble titles to designate successors in certain circumstances, with royal approval, when they had no descendants. The decision confirmed Margarita's position as Duchess of Hernani.

== Later life ==
Margarita continued her involvement in cultural, educational and charitable organisations, maintaining a public role largely independent of the official duties performed by her brother, Juan Carlos, and other working members of the Spanish royal family. Much of her activity centred on the Fundación Duques de Soria, which she and her husband, Carlos Zurita, had establishedz. As honorary presidents, Margarita and Zurita regularly participated in its academic programmes, conferences, exhibitions and cultural events, particularly those held in Soria.

The foundation marked its twentieth anniversary in July 2009 with a series of events in Soria. Margarita and Zurita welcomed the Prince and Princess of Asturias, who presided over the anniversary celebrations. The programme included academic and cultural activities highlighting the foundation's work in promoting Spanish-language scholarship and cooperation with universities. The occasion reflected the couple's continuing association with the city and their role in supporting the institution's activities.

In February 2009, Margarita and Zurita were invested as honorary doctors by the University of Valladolid. The university had approved the distinction in recognition of their contribution to the development of its Soria campus and their support for the institution. The ceremony took place at the Convent of La Merced in Soria and was presided over by Queen Sofía. Their honorary doctorates represented a further recognition of their work in support of higher education and cultural development in the region.

Margarita continued to support organisations concerned with healthcare, disability and social welfare. She held honorary positions with organisations including UNICEF España, the Fundación ONCE, the Fundación Española del Corazón and the Federación Española de Hemofilia. Her connection with disability organisations was particularly significant because she had been blind since infancy. She was also associated with the Spanish Federation of Associations of People Affected by Retinitis Pigmentosa and other organisations supporting people with visual impairments. Her involvement was generally carried out through honorary and patronage roles rather than through the day-to-day management of the organisations.

Margarita's association with the ONCE was also personal. In April 2019, shortly after her eightieth birthday, the organisation marked the occasion with a visit to its Tiflological Museum and Bibliographic Service in Madrid. She was shown examples of accessible publications, including books produced in Braille and other formats intended for readers with visual disabilities. The visit highlighted her longstanding relationship with the organisation and its work to improve access to education and culture for blind and partially sighted people.

In April 2018, Margarita became a grandmother when her daughter, María, gave birth to her son, Carlos, following fertility treatment. María had decided to become a mother without a partner, a decision which received the support of her parents and other members of the family. The birth was premature, following complications during the pregnancy, and the infant initially required medical care. Margarita and Zurita subsequently played an active role in their grandson's upbringing.

Margarita celebrated her eightieth birthday on 6 March 2019. A family celebration in Madrid was attended by Queen Sofía, Infanta Elena and several relatives and friends, as well as figures from Spanish business and cultural life. Her brother, King Juan Carlos, was unable to attend.

Margarita was described as a keen music enthusiast and pianist. Her interests included classical music as well as rock and popular music, and she had attended concerts by performers such as AC/DC, Bruce Springsteen and Sting. She was known for preferring to sit among ordinary concertgoers rather than use reserved royal or VIP seating. Margarita generally preferred to be treated in the same way as other participants in social and sporting activities, rather than having her disability determine how she was included. By this time, however, her mobility had become more restricted and she was frequently using a wheelchair when appearing in public.

The death of her elder sister, Pilar, in January 2020 left Margarita as the only surviving sister of Juan Carlos. The sisters had remained close throughout their lives and had shared an interest in charitable work. Margarita also maintained a close relationship with Sofía, her sister-in-law. She was among the relatives who publicly expressed support for Sofía during the controversy surrounding the royal family's Easter appearance in 2018. In her 2019 interview with El País, Margarita was reported to have criticised the incident and defended her sister-in-law.

Following Juan Carlos's departure from Spain in August 2020 and his subsequent residence in Abu Dhabi, Margarita continued to maintain contact with her brother. Their relationship had remained close since childhood, and she visited him during some of his stays in Spain. In particular, she travelled to Sanxenxo in Galicia, where Juan Carlos regularly stayed with his friend Pedro Campos and attended sailing regattas. Margarita was sometimes accompanied by Zurita, their children and her grandson.

In April 2024, she attended the funeral of her nephew Fernando Gómez-Acebo in Madrid. She was also photographed with Juan Carlos during his visits to Sanxenxo, including an appearance at the town's marina in October 2024. Her participation in these gatherings was sometimes limited by her mobility and health, but she continued to travel when circumstances permitted.

In 2025, she continued to follow her brother's visits to Galicia, although her own attendance was affected by her health. In May of that year, she travelled to Sanxenxo to see Juan Carlos during one of his stays. Her appearances at the regattas and visits were generally accompanied by members of her immediate family.

=== Health ===
In July 2011, Margarita was admitted to the Ruber Internacional Hospital in Madrid for a skin condition affecting her right leg. She remained in hospital for three days before being discharged. The following year, she was again unable to attend an academic event organised by the Fundación Duques de Soria because of a medical problem. In July 2012, she had been admitted to a Madrid hospital with a high fever of approximately 40 °C (104 °F).

In April 2022, Margarita was taken to hospital after falling during a meal with friends at a restaurant in Madrid. She sustained injuries to her face and head and underwent medical examinations, including a scan, to rule out more serious injuries. Press reports said that she was discharged after doctors found no serious complications.

During 2025, Margarita experienced two separate infectious illnesses. In the middle of the year, she was treated in hospital for a skin infection accompanied by lymphangitis in her left leg. The condition required medical attention but she subsequently recovered.

In October 2025, Margarita was hospitalised with pneumonia and spent ten days in the intensive care unit of a hospital in Madrid. She left hospital on 28 October and required supplementary oxygen at home during her convalescence.

In 2026, Margarita underwent an operation on her vocal cords. The procedure had not produced the expected improvement in her voice and that she continued to experience difficulty speaking clearly. Her daughter explained to reporters in November that the difficulty communicating had been present for some time and was related to the earlier operation, rather than being a symptom of the infection for which Margarita was then receiving treatment. The procedure and its outcome also affected her ability to travel and attend some family events.

On 15 November 2026, it was reported that Margarita had been admitted to the intensive care unit of the Hospital General Universitario Gregorio Marañón in Madrid because of another infection. She had been in hospital for several days, although the nature of the infection had not been disclosed. Her condition was not considered serious and that she was responding favourably to treatment, with the infection showing signs of improvement.

== Titles, styles and honours ==
Infanta Margarita renounced her right of succession to the Spanish throne upon marriage because it was not a dynastic wedding.

On 6 January 1979, the Infanta's distant cousin Manfredo de Borbón, 1st Duke of Hernani, died and willed his ducal title to be inherited by Margarita. The King granted this request in 1977 and, on 27 May 1981, she became 2nd Duchess of Hernani, accompanied by the dignity of Grandee. The peerage title refers to the town Hernani, Spain. The month after, on 23 June 1981, King Juan Carlos created her Duchess of Soria (referring to the city Soria, Spain); this title is a title of the Royal House and cannot be inherited by her children.

=== Titles and styles ===
- 6 March 1939 – 19 May 1981: Her Royal Highness Infanta Doña Margarita
- 19 May 1981 – 23 June 1981: Her Royal Highness Infanta Doña Margarita, Duchess of Hernani
- 23 June 1981 – present: Her Royal Highness Infanta Doña Margarita, Duchess of Soria

=== Honours ===
==== National ====
- Spain: Knight Grand Cross of the Royal and Distinguished Spanish Order of Charles III
- Spain: 1,192nd Dame Grand Cross of the Royal Order of Noble Ladies of Queen Maria Luisa
- Spain: Knight Grand Cross of the Civil Order of Alfonso X, the Wise

==== Foreign ====
- (Greece) Greek Royal Family: Dame Grand Cross of the Royal Family Order of Saints Olga and Sophia
- Italy
  - (Kingdom of the Two Sicilies) Two Sicilian Royal Family: Knight Grand Cross of Justice of the Two Sicilian Royal Sacred Military Constantinian Order of Saint George
- Portugal: Grand Cross of the Order of Infante Henry

Infanta Margarita, Duchess of Soria Bourbons of Spain Born: 6 March 1939
Spanish nobility
Preceded by Manfredo de Borbón	Duchess of Hernani; 1981–present	Incumbent; Heir: Alfonso Zurita y de Borbón
