= T.M.P. Mahadevan =

Telliyavaram Mahadevan Ponnambalam Mahadevan (24 August 1911 – 5 November 1983) was an Indian writer, philosopher, and Advaita scholar. He was a professor of philosophy at the University of Madras. His doctoral thesis was titled "The Philosophy of Advaita".
