= Grandmother of Europe =

Nickname of various female monarchs

The sobriquet grandmother of Europe has been given to various women, primarily female sovereigns who are the antecedent of many members of European nobility and royalty, as well as women who made important contributions to Europe.

== Royalty ==
- Eleanor of Aquitaine (1122–1204) was queen consort of France from 1137 to 1152, then of England from 1154 to 1189, as well as Duchess of Aquitaine in her own right from 1137 to 1204. She earned the nickname because her descendants included royalty in England, France, Denmark, Castile, and Sicily, among other kingdoms.
- Elizabeth Charlotte, Madame Palatine (1652–1722) was the second wife of Philippe I, Duke of Orléans (younger brother of Louis XIV of France). Through her daughter she was the grandmother of Francis I, Holy Roman Emperor, the husband of Maria Theresa, and great-grandmother of Joseph II and Leopold II (both Holy Roman Emperors) and Marie Antoinette, the last Queen of France before the French Revolution.
- Maria Theresa (1717–1780) was the only female ruler and longest-reigning sovereign of both the Habsburg monarchy and the Holy Roman Empire. Many of her children and grandchildren were married to various European royals, and her descendants ruled many kingdoms in Europe and across the Americas. Among her children, the most notable were her daughter Marie Antoinette (Maria Antonia), Queen of France; Maria Carolina, Queen of Naples and Sicily; Maria Christina, Duchess of Teschen; and Maria Amalia, Duchess of Parma. Maria Theresa was also the great-grandmother of Marie Louise, Duchess of Parma, Maria Leopoldina of Austria, Frederick Augustus II of Saxony, and Ferdinand II of the Two Sicilies. She was also the great-great grandmother of Franz Joseph I of Austria, Charlotte of Belgium, Pedro II of Brazil, Maximilian I of Mexico, Victor Emmanuel II of Italy, Maria II of Portugal and Napoleon II.
- Maria Amalia of Naples and Sicily (1782–1866) was Queen-consort of the French king Louis Philippe I. She is known as Grand-mère de l'Europe.
- Queen Victoria (1819–1901) was Queen of the United Kingdom and Empress of India. She had nine children, who married with royal families throughout Europe. At the outbreak of the First World War, her grandchildren occupied the thrones of both Germany and the United Kingdom.

== Others ==
- Louise Weiss (1893–1983) was a French author and a European Union politician. She earned the nickname not for her grandchildren but for her own contributions to European political institutions.

== See also ==
- Descendants of Queen Victoria
- Father-in-law of Europe, which refers to two kings during the 19th and 20th centuries:
  - Nicholas I of Montenegro; and
  - Christian IX of Denmark
    - Descendants of Christian IX of Denmark
    - Royal descendants of Queen Victoria and of King Christian IX
- Louis IX of Hesse-Darmstadt, the most recent common ancestor of all European monarchs since 2022
- Edward VII of the United Kingdom, known as the Uncle of Europe
