= Royal descendants of Queen Victoria and of King Christian IX =

Royal progeny of Queen Victoria and Christian IX of Denmark

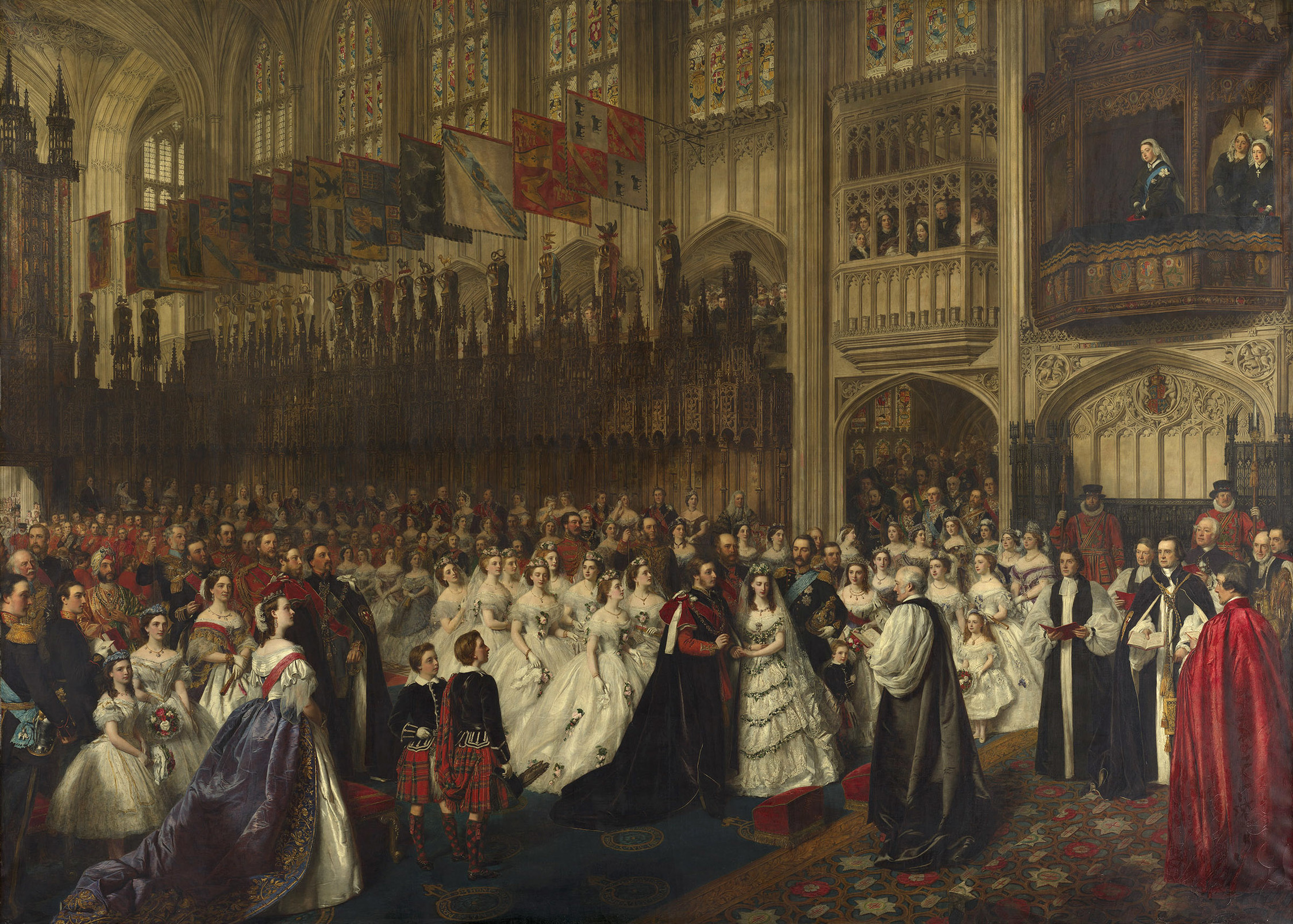
Painting by William Powell Frith depicting the marriage of Albert Edward, Prince of Wales (later Edward VII), Queen Victoria's son, with Princess Alexandra of Denmark, King Christian IX's daughter

The royal descendants of Queen Victoria (24 May 1819 – 22 January 1901; r. 1837–1901) and of King Christian IX (8 April 1818 – 29 January 1906; r. 1863–1906), Monarchs of the United Kingdom and Denmark, respectively, have become members of multiple European royal families. This was partially achieved by the marriage of Victoria's progeny with Christian's (and vice versa). By the time of her Diamond Jubilee in 1897, Victoria was known as the "Grandmother of Europe". Christian IX was nicknamed the "Father-in-law of Europe".

Victoria and Christian's grandchildren were the monarchs of Denmark, Germany/Prussia, Greece, Norway, Russia and the United Kingdom. Today, the descendants of Victoria and Christian are monarchs of Belgium, Denmark, Luxembourg, Norway, Spain, Sweden and the United Kingdom.

== Grandchildren ==
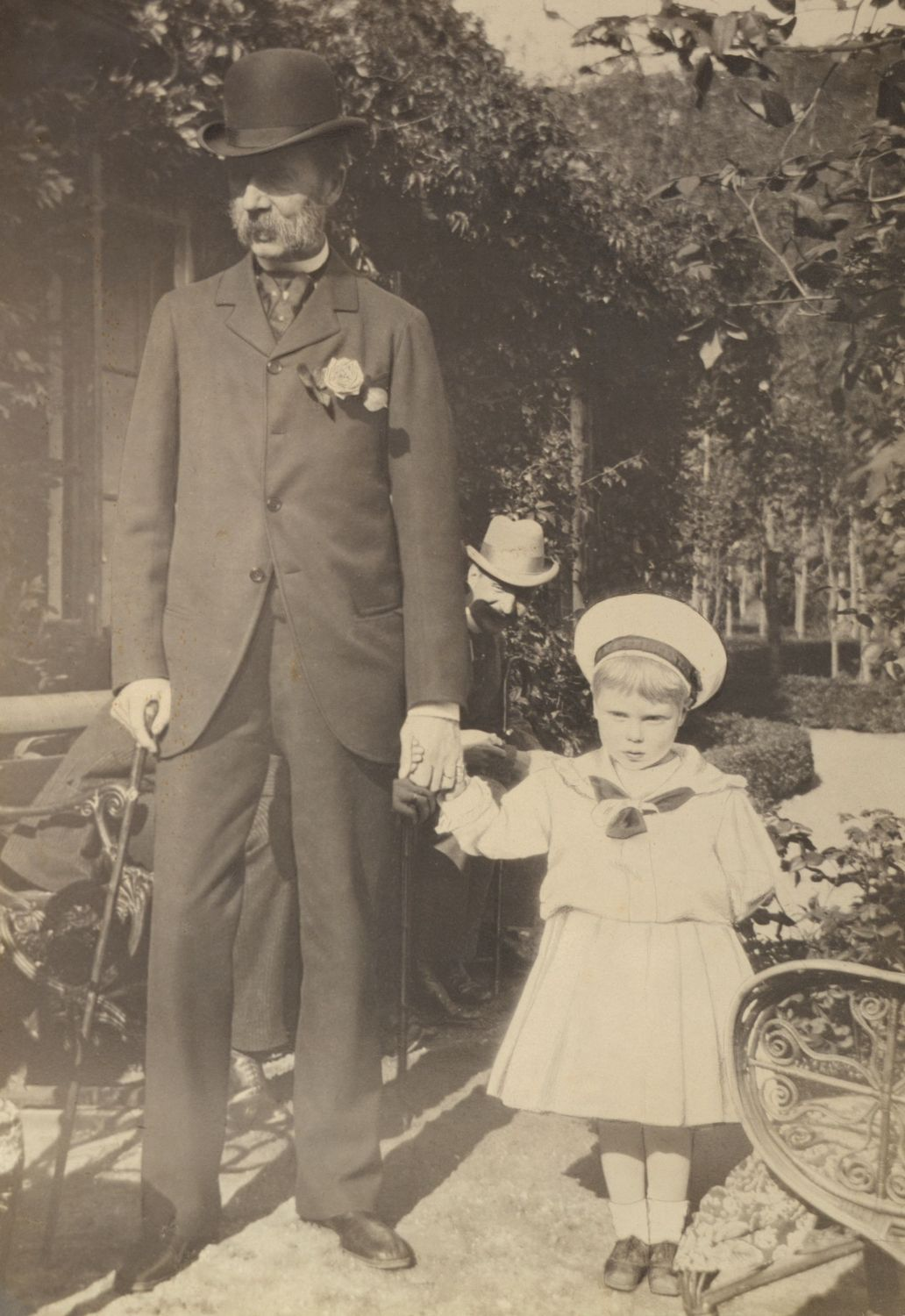
Christian IX in 1898 with his and Queen Victoria's mutual great-grandson Prince Edward of York, later Edward VIII (Note: Edward VIII's father was George V. George's mother, Princess Alexandra of Denmark, was a daughter of Christian IX. Additionally, Queen Victoria was the mother of King Edward VII, George's father.)

Victoria arranged the marriage of her eldest son and heir, the future King Edward VII, to Princess Alexandra of Denmark, the daughter of Christian IX, which took place on 10 March 1863. Among Edward and Alexandra's six children were King George V and his sister Maud. Maud would later marry her cousin, the future King Haakon VII of Norway, in 1896. (Note: Haakon's father, King Frederick VIII of Denmark, was a son of Christian IX.)

A son of Christian and brother of Alexandra, Prince William, became King of the Hellenes as George I in 1863 because of his connection with the British royal family. On 27 October 1889, George's son, later Constantine I of Greece, married Princess Sophia of Prussia. (Note: Sophia's mother, Victoria, Princess Royal, was the eldest daughter of Queen Victoria.)

Another daughter of Christian IX, Princess Dagmar of Denmark, married the future Emperor Alexander III of Russia in October 1866, taking the religious name Maria Feodorovna. Between 1881 and 1894, Maria's husband ruled as Russia's sovereign. Her son, Nicholas II, became Emperor of Russia upon Alexander III's death. Nicholas married Princess Alix of Hesse and by Rhine, a granddaughter of Queen Victoria, on 26 November 1894, and Alix became his consort, adopting the name Alexandra Feodorovna.

Other grandchildren of either or both of Victoria and Christian were sovereigns suo jure or consorts of sovereigns, including:

- King Christian X of Denmark, the elder brother of Haakon VII of Norway
- Wilhelm II, German Emperor and King of Prussia, the elder brother of Sophia of Prussia
- Princess Marie of Edinburgh, the eldest daughter of Alfred, Duke of Saxe-Coburg and Gotha, (Note: Alfred was the second son of Queen Victoria.) who married King Ferdinand I of Romania
- Princess Victoria Eugenie of Battenberg, a daughter of Queen Victoria's youngest daughter Princess Beatrice of the United Kingdom, who married King Alfonso XIII of Spain

Family tree of Victoria and Christian IX's sovereign and consort descendants

(Danish Realm) King Christian IX	(United Kingdom) Queen Victoria
(Danish Realm) Frederick VIII of Denmark	Alexandra of Denmark	Edward VII of the United Kingdom	(Kingdom of Greece) George I of Greece	Victoria, Princess Royal	Alfred of Saxe-Coburg and Gotha	Dagmar of Denmark	Alice, Grand Duchess of Hesse
(Danish Realm) Christian X of Denmark	Haakon VII of Norway	Maud of Wales	George V of the United Kingdom	Andrew of Greece and Denmark	(Kingdom of Greece) Constantine I of Greece	Sophia of Prussia	(German Empire) Wilhelm II of Germany	Marie of Edinburgh	(Russian Empire) Nicholas II of Russia	Alix of Hesse
(Danish Realm) Frederik IX of Denmark	Olav V of Norway	Edward VIII of the United Kingdom	George VI of the United Kingdom	(Kingdom of Greece) George II of Greece	(Kingdom of Greece) Alexander of Greece	(Kingdom of Greece) Paul of Greece	Helen of Greece and Denmark	(Kingdom of Romania) Carol II of Romania
(Danish Realm) Margrethe II of Denmark	Harald V of Norway	Elizabeth II of the United Kingdom	Philip, Duke of Edinburgh	(Kingdom of Greece) Constantine II of Greece	Sofia	(Kingdom of Romania) Michael I of Romania
(Danish Realm) Frederik X of Denmark	Haakon VIII of Norway	Charles III of the United Kingdom	Felipe VI of Spain

=== World War I ===
At the start of World War I, which lasted from 1914 to 1918, six major powers of Europe were divided between two coalitions. On one hand, France, Russia and the United Kingdom formed the Triple Entente. On the other hand, Austria-Hungary, Germany and Italy formed the Triple Alliance. During this conflict, George V was King of the United Kingdom. In addition, during World War I, Nicholas II was Emperor of Russia, and Wilhelm II was the German emperor.

Historian Margaret MacMillan has remarked on the close connection between George, Nicholas and Wilhelm. Namely, George's father, Wilhelm's mother and Nicolas' mother-in-law were siblings, making George and Wilhelm first cousins and Nicholas their first cousin by marriage. (Note: Queen Victoria was a mutual parent of George's father, Wilhelm's mother and Nicholas' mother-in-law.) Additionally, George's mother and Nicholas's mother were sisters from the Danish royal family, making George and Nicholas first cousins. (Note: George's mother and Nicholas's mother were mutual daughters of Christian IX.)

== Later descendants ==
There are seven current reigning monarchs in Europe who are descended from either Victoria or Christian IX or both. In 2004, while touring Tatoi Palace and the Greek royal cemetery, Queen Anne-Marie of Greece commented of the royals' relations, "So you see, everybody comes from two sides — Denmark, King Christian IX, and Britain, Queen Victoria — and they all sort of criss crossed, I mean us too!" Anne-Marie is a descendant of both Victoria and Christian IX, as was her husband, Constantine II of Greece.

=== Contemporary monarchs ===
Multiple reigning European monarchs are descended from Victoria or Christian IX:

- The King of Denmark, Frederik X, is a descendant of both Victoria (Note: Frederik — son of Queen Margrethe II of Denmark — daughter of Queen Ingrid of Denmark — daughter of Crown Princess Margaret of Sweden — daughter of Prince Arthur of UK — son of Queen Victoria.) and Christian. (Note: Frederik — son of Queen Margrethe II of Denmark — daughter of King Frederik IX of Denmark — son of King Christian X of Denmark — son of King Frederick VIII of Denmark — son of King Christian IX.)
- The King of the United Kingdom, Charles III, is a descendant of both Victoria (Note: Charles — son of Queen Elizabeth II of UK — daughter of King George VI of UK — son of King George V of UK — son of King Edward VII of UK — son of Queen Victoria. Charles — son of Prince Philip — son of Princess Alice of Battenberg — daughter of Princess Victoria of Hesse and by Rhine — daughter of Grand Duchess Alice of Hesse — daughter of Queen Victoria.) and Christian. (Note: Charles — son of Queen Elizabeth II of UK — daughter of King George VI of UK — son of King George V of UK — son of Queen Alexandra of UK — daughter of King Christian IX. Charles — son of Prince Philip — son of Prince Andrew of Greece and Denmark — son of King George I of Greece — son of King Christian IX.)
- The King of Norway, Haakon VIII, is a descendant of both Victoria (Note: Haakon — son of King Harald V of Norway — son of King Olav V of Norway — son of Queen Maud of Norway — daughter of King Edward VII of UK — son of Queen Victoria.) and Christian. (Note: Haakon — son of King Harald V of Norway — son of King Olav V of Norway — son of King Haakon VII of Norway — son of King Frederick VIII of Denmark — son of King Christian IX. Haakon — son of King Harald V of Norway — son of Crown Princess Martha of Norway — daughter of Princess Ingeborg of Denmark — daughter of King Frederick VIII of Denmark — son of King Christian IX. Haakon — son of King Harald V of Norway — son of King Olav V of Norway — son of Queen Maud of Norway — daughter of Queen Alexandra of UK — daughter of King Christian IX.)
- The King of Spain, Felipe VI, is also descended from both Victoria (Note: Felipe — son of King Juan Carlos I of Spain — son of Infante Juan, Count of Barcelona — son of Queen Victoria Eugenie of Spain — daughter of Princess Beatrice of the United Kingdom — daughter of Queen Victoria. Felipe — son of Queen Sofía of Spain — daughter of Queen Frederica of Greece — daughter of Duchess Victoria Louise of Brunswick — daughter of Kaiser Wilhelm II of Germany — son of Victoria, German Empress — daughter of Queen Victoria. Felipe — son of Queen Sofía of Spain — daughter of King Paul of Greece — daughter of Queen Sophia of Greece — daughter of Victoria, German Empress — daughter of Queen Victoria.) and Christian. (Note: Felipe — son of Queen Sofía of Spain — daughter of King Paul of Greece — son of King Constantine I of Greece — son of King George I of Greece — son of King Christian IX. Felipe — son of Queen Sofía of Spain — daughter of Queen Frederica of Greece — daughter of Ernest Augustus, Duke of Brunswick — son of Princess Thyra of Denmark — daughter of King Christian IX.)
- The King of Sweden, Carl XVI Gustaf, is a descendant of Victoria. (Note: Carl Gustaf — son of Prince Gustaf Adolf of Sweden — son of Crown Princess Margaret of Sweden — daughter of Prince Arthur of UK — son of Queen Victoria. Carl Gustaf — son of Princess Sibylla of Saxe-Coburg and Gotha — daughter of Charles Edward, Duke of Saxe-Coburg and Gotha — daughter of Prince Leopold of UK — son of Queen Victoria.)
- The King of the Belgians, Philippe, is descended from Christian. (Note: Philippe — son of King Albert II of Belgium — son of Queen Astrid of Belgium — daughter of Princess Ingeborg of Denmark — daughter of King Frederick VIII of Denmark — son of King Christian IX.)
- The Grand Duke of Luxembourg, Guillaume V, is descended from Christian. (Note: Guillaume — son of Henri, Grand Duke of Luxembourg — son of Grand Duchess Joséphine-Charlotte of Luxembourg — daughter of Queen Astrid of Belgium — daughter of Princess Ingeborg of Denmark — daughter of King Frederick VIII of Denmark — son of King Christian IX.)

=== Monarchs descended from Queen Victoria ===
Sovereign descendants of Queen Victoria. Names of monarchs are bolded.

**Victoria**; Queen of the United Kingdom
**Edward VII**; King of the United Kingdom	Alice; Grand Duchess of Hesse and by Rhine	Prince Arthur, Duke of Connaught and Strathearn	Prince Leopold, Duke of Albany	Princess Beatrice of the United Kingdom	Victoria; German Empress	**Alfred**; Duke of Saxe-Coburg and Gotha
**George V** King of the United Kingdom	Princess Victoria of Hesse and by Rhine (Note: Victoria's brother, Ernest Louis, was Grand Duke of Hesse.)	Alexandra Feodorovna; Empress of Russia (Note: Alexandra's brother, Ernest Louis, was Grand Duke of Hesse.)	Maud; Queen of Norway	Margaret; Crown Princess of Sweden	**Charles Edward**; Duke of Saxe-Coburg and Gotha	Victoria Eugenie; Queen of Spain	(German Empire) **Wilhelm II**; German Emperor	Sophia; Queen of the Hellenes	Marie; Queen of Romania (Note: Another child of Alfred, Princess Victoria Melita, was the spouse of Ernest Louis, Grand Duke of Hesse prior to the dissolvement of their marriage in 1901.)
**George VI**; King of the United Kingdom (Note: George became King of the United Kingdom upon the abdication of his brother, King Edward VIII.)	Princess Alice of Battenberg	Louise; Queen of Sweden	**Olav V** King of Norway	Ingrid; Queen of Denmark	Prince Gustaf Adolf, Duke of Västerbotten	Princess Sibylla of Saxe-Coburg and Gotha	Victoria Louise; Duchess of Brunswick	(Kingdom of Romania) **Carol II**; King of Romania (Note: Another child of Marie, Princess Elisabeth of Romania, was the spouse of George II, King of the Hellenes prior to their divorce in 1935.)	Maria; Queen of Yugoslavia
**Elizabeth II**; Queen of the United Kingdom	Prince Philip of Greece and Denmark	**Harald V** King of Norway	**Margrethe II**; Queen of Denmark	**Carl XVI Gustaf**; King of Sweden	Infante Juan, Count of Barcelona	Frederica; Queen of the Hellenes	(Kingdom of Greece) **Paul**; King of the Hellenes (Note: Contantine I had two other children, George II and Alexander, who became King of the Hellenes. Alexander's daughter was Princess Alexandra of Greece and Denmark, the spouse of King Peter II of Yugoslavia.)	(Kingdom of Romania) **Michael I** King of Romania (Note: Michael was a son of Princess Helen of Greece and Denmark, herself a child of Princess Sophia of Prussia.)
**Charles III**; King of the United Kingdom	**Haakon VIII**; King of Norway	**Frederik X** King of Denmark	Victoria, Crown Princess of Sweden	**Juan Carlos I** King of Spain	Sofía; Queen of Spain	(Kingdom of Greece) **Constantine II**; King of the Hellenes (Note: Constantine's spouse, Anne-Marie, is a sibling of Queen Margrethe II.)	(Kingdom of Yugoslavia) **Peter II**; King of Yugoslavia (Note: Peter II's spouse, Princess Alexandra of Greece and Denmark, was the daughter of Alexander, King of the Hellenes.)
William, Prince of Wales	Ingrid Alexandra, Crown Princess of Norway	Christian, Crown Prince of Denmark	Princess Estelle, Duchess of Östergötland	**Felipe VI**; King of Spain
Prince George of Wales	Leonor, Princess of Asturias

=== Monarchs descended from King Christian IX ===
Sovereign descendants of King Christian IX. Names of monarchs are bolded.

(Danish Realm) **Christian IX**; King of Denmark
(Danish Realm) **Frederick VIII**; King of Denmark	Alexandra; Queen of the United Kingdom	(Kingdom of Greece) **George I** King of the Hellenes	Maria Feodorovna; Empress of Russia	Thyra; Crown Princess of Hanover
(Danish Realm) **Christian X** King of Denmark	Princess Ingeborg of Denmark	**Haakon VII**; King of Norway	Maud; Queen of Norway	**George V** King of the United Kingdom	Prince Andrew of Greece and Denmark	(Kingdom of Greece) **Constantine I** King of the Hellenes	(Russian Empire) **Nicholas II**; Emperor of Russia	(Duchy of Brunswick) **Ernest Augustus**; Duke of Brunswick (Note: Another child of Thyra, Princess Alexandra of Hanover, was the spouse of Frederick Francis IV, Grand Duke of Mecklenburg-Schwerin.)
(Danish Realm) **Frederik IX**; King of Denmark	Astrid; Queen of the Belgians	Märtha; Crown Princess of Norway (Note: Märtha never became Queen of Norway.)	**Olav V** King of Norway	**George VI**; King of the United Kingdom	Helen; Queen Mother of Romania	(Kingdom of Greece) **Paul**; King of the Hellenes	Frederica; Queen of the Hellenes
(Danish Realm) **Margrethe II**; Queen of Denmark	Joséphine-Charlotte; Grand Duchess of Luxembourg	(Belgium) **Albert II**; King of the Belgians (Note: Albert II became King of the Belgians after the death of his brother, Baudouin.)	**Harald V** King of Norway	**Elizabeth II**; Queen of the United Kingdom	Prince Philip of Greece and Denmark	(Kingdom of Romania) **Michael I** King of Romania (Note: Michael's spouse was Princess Anne of Bourbon-Parma, whose mother was Princess Margaret of Denmark. Margaret was a child of Prince Valdemar of Denmark, himself a son of Christian IX.)	(Kingdom of Greece) **Constantine II**; King of the Hellenes	Sofía; Queen of Spain
(Danish Realm) **Frederik X** King of Denmark	**Henri**; Grand Duke of Luxembourg	(Belgium) **Philippe**; King of the Belgians	**Haakon VIII**; King of Norway	**Charles III**; King of the United Kingdom	**Felipe VI**; King of Spain
Christian, Crown Prince of Denmark	**Guillaume V** Grand Duke of Luxembourg	Princess Elisabeth, Duchess of Brabant	Ingrid Alexandra, Crown Princess of Norway	William, Prince of Wales	Leonor, Princess of Asturias
Prince Charles of Luxembourg	Prince George of Wales

== See also ==
- John William Friso – the most recent common ancestor of all European monarchs that have reigned since World War II
- Louis IX of Hesse-Darmstadt – the most common recent ancestor of all current European monarchs from 2022

== Footnotes ==
=== References ===
- Amalienborg Palace (n.d.). "Frederik VIII 1906-1912".
- Burke, Bernard; Burke, Ashworth P. (1914). Burke's Genealogical and Heraldic History of Peerage, Baronetage, and Knightage. Harrison and Sons.
- Cour grand-ducale (Henri) (n.d.). "H.R.H. the Grand Duke".
- Cour grand-ducale (Joséphine-Charlotte) (n.d.). "H.R.H. Grand Duchess Joséphine-Charlotte".
- Gibbney, H.J. (1972). "Duke of Edinburgh (1844–1900)". Australian Dictionary of Biography. Vol. 4. Australian National University.
- Kongehuset (Anne-Marie) (n.d.). "HM Queen Anne-Marie".
- Kongehuset (Margrethe) (n.d.). "HM Queen Margrethe".
- Pearl, Diana (2 August 2016). "Ambulance Driver, Poultry Farm Worker and Exiled Royal: Inside the Fascinating Life of the Late Queen Anne of Romania". People. Dotdash Meredith.
- Reuters (30 November 1982). "Queen Helen of Rumania, 87; Was Forced Into Exile in '47". The New York Times. p. 12.
- Swedish Royal Court (Astrid) (n.d.). "Princess Astrid".
- Swedish Royal Court (Ingeborg) (n.d.). "Princess Ingeborg".
- The Belgian Monarchy (Albert) (n.d.). "King Albert II".
- The Belgian Monarchy (Philippe) (n.d.). "The King".
- The Royal Danish Collection (George) (n.d.). "Vilhelm (Georg I)". Amalienborg Palace.
- The Royal Danish Collection (Valdemar) (n.d.). "Valdemar". Amalienborg Palace.
- The Royal Family of Serbia (n.d.). "HM Queen Alexandra of Yugoslavia".
- The Royal House of Norway (Märtha) (n.d.). "Biography".
- Wilson, Penny (n.d.). "Ernest Ludwig, Grand Duke of Hesse". Alexander Palace Time Machine. Bob Atchinson.
