= Order of the Highest Privilege (Ottoman Empire) =

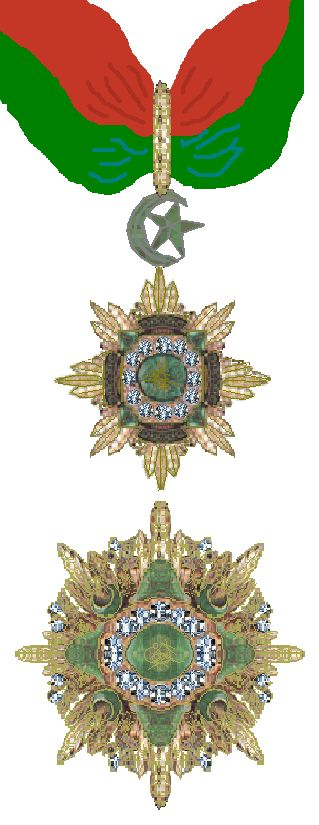
- Native name: Nişan-ı Âli İmtiyaz
- Type: Medal of valour
- Awarded for: In the Ottoman Empire, it was given to reward its subjects and allies.
- Date: 1879
- Country: Ottoman Empire
- Status: Not provided.

Precedence
- Next (higher): Order of Distinction
- Equivalent: None
- Next (lower): Order of Merit (tr)

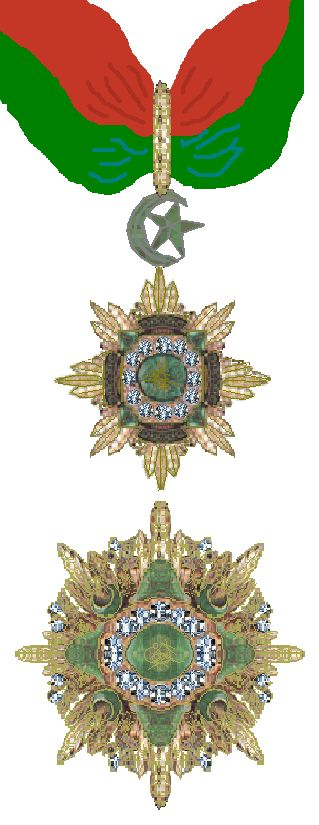
Nişan-ı Âli İmtiyaz

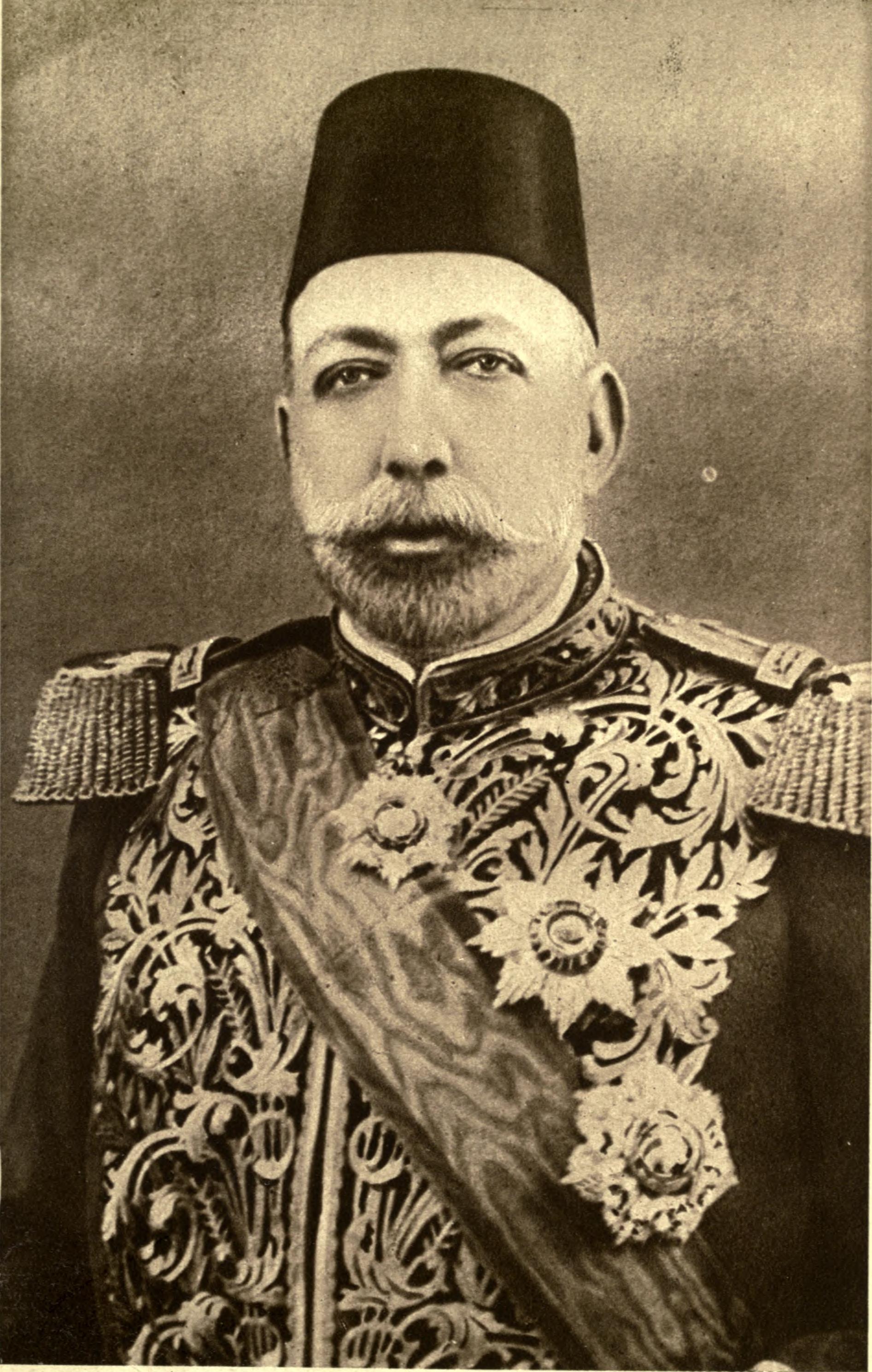
Sultan Mehmed V wearing his Nişan-ı Âli İmtiyaz in a photo.

The Order of High Privilege (Ottoman Turkish: Nişan-ı Âli İmtiyaz) was a badge of honour created in 1879 during the reign of Sultan Abdülhamid II to reward subjects and allies of the Ottoman Empire for bravery.

== Description ==
The insignia of the Order bore the Sultan's Tughra on a badge decorated with gold and diamonds. The badge was attached to a red-green moiré ribbon with a suspension device containing the Ottoman national emblem the Star and crescent.

== Recipients ==
In 1885, it was awarded to King Christian IX of Denmark.
