= Christian IX =

King of Denmark from 1863 to 1906

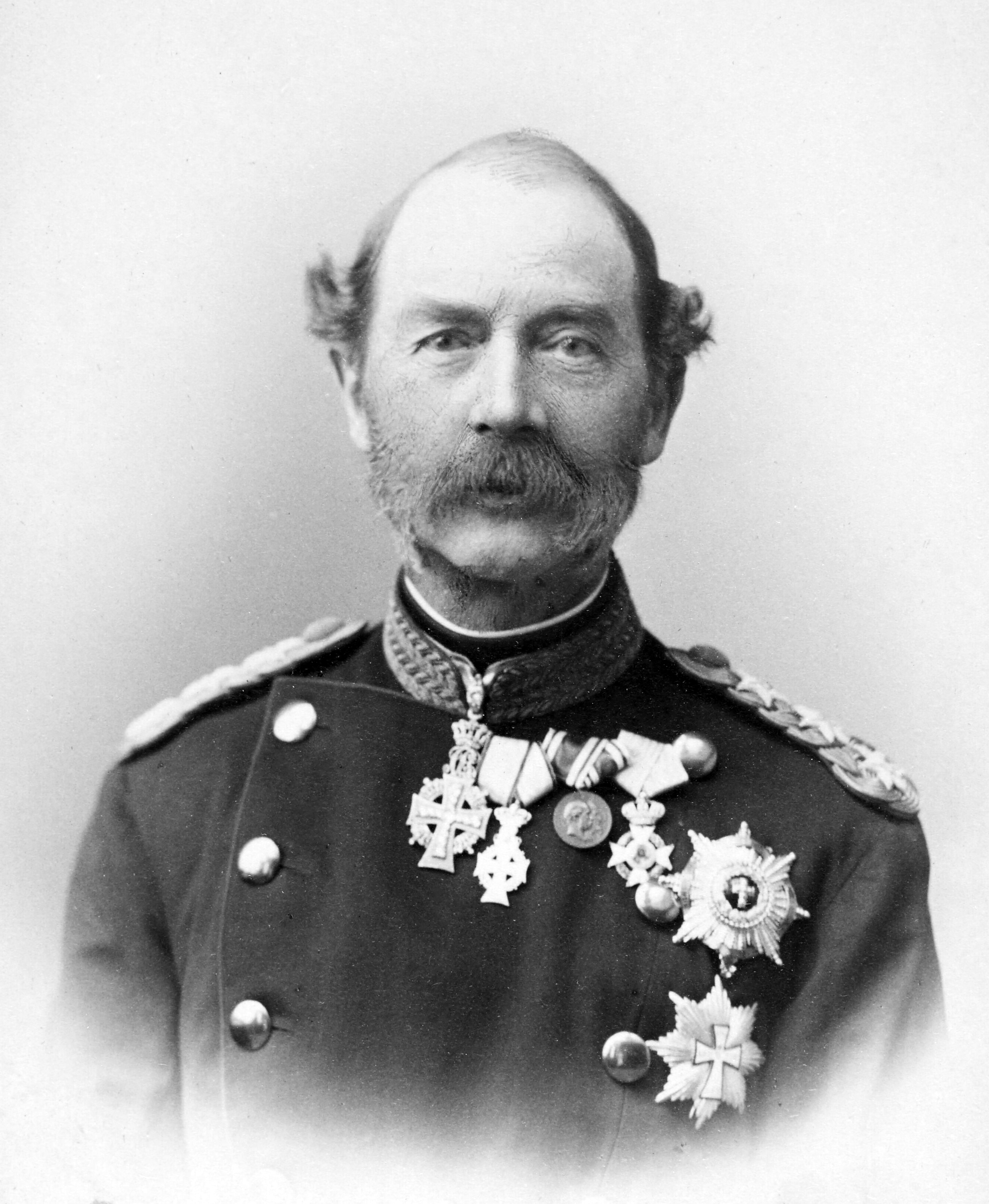
- Portrait, c. 1900–1906

King of Denmark
- Reign: 15 November 1863 – 29 January 1906
- Predecessor: Frederick VII
- Successor: Frederick VIII

Duke of Schleswig, Holstein and Lauenburg
- Reign: 15 November 1863 – 30 October 1864
- Predecessor: Frederick VII & II
- Successor: Lost to Prussia and Austria
- Born: Prince Christian of Schleswig-Holstein-Sonderburg-Beck; 8 April 1818; Gottorf Castle, Schleswig, Duchy of Schleswig
- Died: 29 January 1906 (aged 87); Amalienborg Palace, Copenhagen, Denmark
- Burial: 15 February 1906; Roskilde Cathedral
- Spouse: Louise of Hesse-Kassel (m. 1842; died 1898)
- Issue Detail: Frederick VIII of Denmark; Alexandra, Queen of the United Kingdom; George I of Greece; Maria Feodorovna, Empress of Russia; Thyra, Crown Princess of Hanover; Prince Valdemar
- House: Glücksburg
- Father: Friedrich Wilhelm, Duke of Schleswig-Holstein-Sonderburg-Glücksburg
- Mother: Princess Louise Caroline of Hesse-Kassel

Christian IX (8 April 1818 – 29 January 1906) was King of Denmark from 15 November 1863 until his death in 1906. From 1863 to 1864, he was concurrently Duke of Schleswig, Holstein and Lauenburg. He became one of the most influential monarchs of 19th-century Europe through the dynastic marriages of his children, earning the sobriquet "father-in-law of Europe". Because many later European monarchs descended from him, he is also sometimes informally described as the "grandfather of Europe".

A younger son of Frederick William, Duke of Schleswig-Holstein-Sonderburg-Glücksburg, Christian grew up in the Duchy of Schleswig as a prince of Schleswig-Holstein-Sonderburg-Glücksburg, a junior branch of the House of Oldenburg, which had ruled Denmark since 1448. Although having close family ties to the Danish royal family, he was originally not in the immediate line of succession to the Danish throne. Following the early death of his father in 1831, Christian grew up in Denmark and was educated at the Military Academy of Copenhagen. After unsuccessfully seeking the hand of Queen Victoria of the United Kingdom in marriage, he married his double second cousin, Princess Louise of Hesse-Kassel, in 1842.

In 1852, Christian was chosen as heir presumptive to the Danish throne in light of the expected extinction of the senior line of the House of Oldenburg. Upon the death of King Frederick VII in 1863, Christian (who was Frederick's second cousin and husband of Frederick's paternal first cousin, Louise of Hesse-Kassel) acceded to the throne as the first Danish monarch of the House of Glücksburg.

The beginning of his reign was marked by the Danish defeat in the Second Schleswig War and the subsequent loss of the duchies of Schleswig, Holstein and Lauenburg which made the king immensely unpopular. The following years of his reign were dominated by political disputes, for Denmark had only become a constitutional monarchy in 1849 and the balance of power between the sovereign and parliament was still in dispute. In spite of his initial unpopularity and the many years of political strife, in which the king was in conflict with large parts of the population, his popularity recovered towards the end of his reign, and he became a national icon due to the length of his reign and the high standards of personal morality with which he was identified.

Christian's six children with Louise married into other European royal families. Among his descendants are King Frederik X, King Philippe of Belgium, King Haakon VIII of Norway, Grand Duke Guillaume V of Luxembourg, King Charles III of the United Kingdom, and King Felipe VI of Spain.

== Early life ==
=== Birth and family ===
Christian IX was born between 10 and 11 a.m. on 8 April 1818 at the residence of his maternal grandparents, Gottorf Castle, near the town of Schleswig in the Duchy of Schleswig, at the time a fief under the Crown of Denmark. Born as a prince of Schleswig-Holstein-Sonderburg-Beck, he was the fourth son of Friedrich Wilhelm, Duke of Schleswig-Holstein-Sonderburg-Beck, and Princess Louise Caroline of Hesse-Kassel. He was named after his mother's cousin Prince Christian Frederick of Denmark, the later King Christian VIII, who was also his godfather. Together with his wife, Caroline Amalie of Augustenborg, he had traveled from Augustenborg to Gottorp so that he could hold his godson at the christening, which was held at the end of May in the chapel of Gottorp Castle.

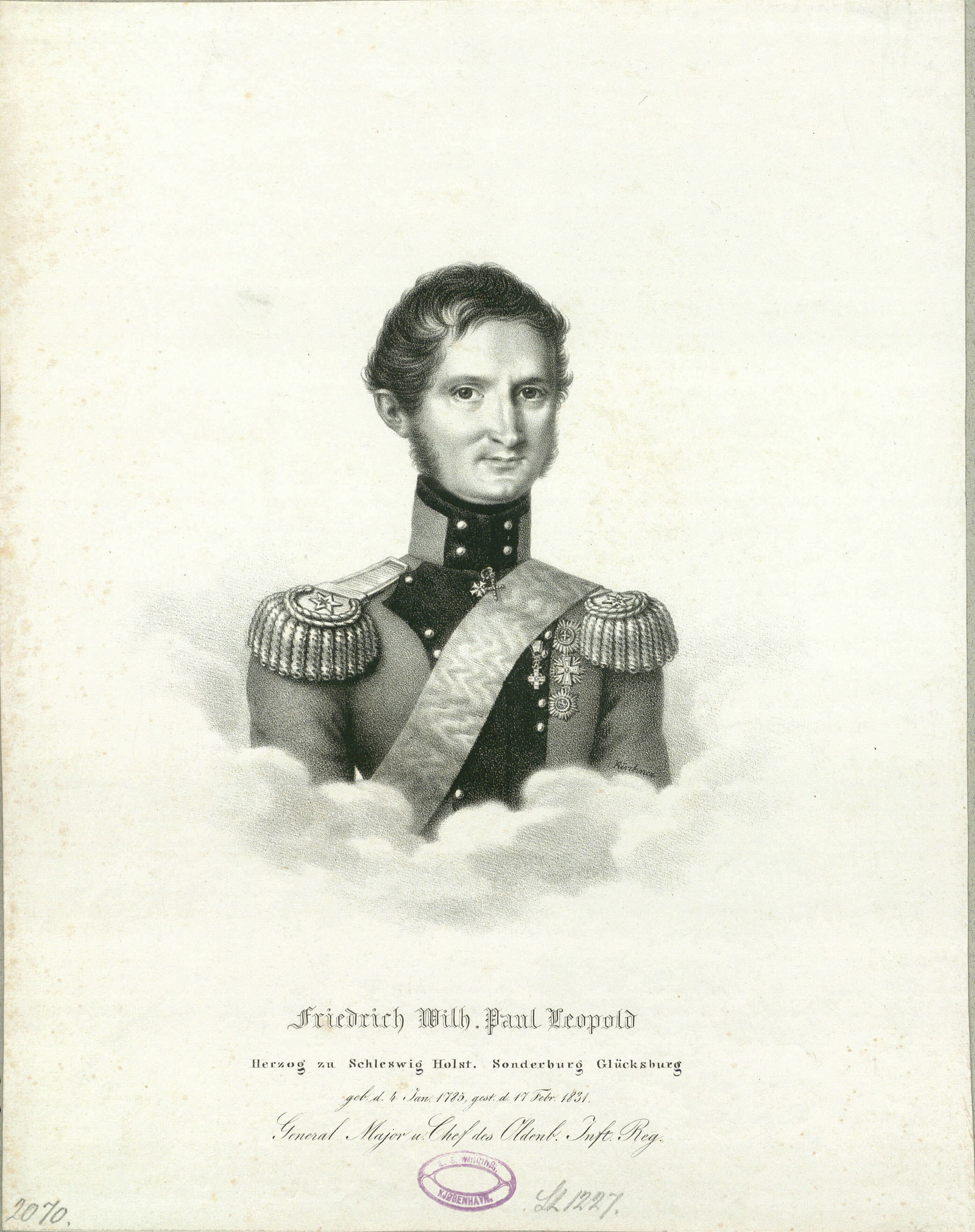
Prince Christian's father Friedrich Wilhelm, Duke of Schleswig-Holstein-Sonderburg-Beck, from 1825 Duke of Glücksburg

Prince Christian's father was the head of the ducal house of Schleswig-Holstein-Sonderburg-Beck, a junior male branch of the House of Oldenburg. The family descended from King Christian III of Denmark's younger son, John the Younger, Duke of Schleswig-Holstein-Sonderburg, whose grandson Duke August Philipp severed his ties with Denmark and emigrated to Germany where he acquired the manor of Haus Beck in Westphalia, after which the lineage was named Schleswig-Holstein-Sonderburg-Beck. His sons and their descendants went into Prussian, Polish and Russian service, until his great-great-grandson, Prince Christian's father, again went into Danish military service, where he was stationed in Holstein. It was there that he had met and married Prince Christian's mother, who was a daughter of Prince Charles of Hesse-Kassel, an originally German prince, who, however, had grown up at the Danish court and had married King Frederick V's youngest daughter, Princess Louise of Denmark. Prince Charles had made a career in Denmark, where he was a Danish field marshal and Royal Governor of the duchies of Schleswig and Holstein.

Through his father, Prince Christian was thus a direct male-line descendant of King Christian III of Denmark and an (albeit junior) agnatic descendant of Hedvig of Holstein (countess of Oldenburg), mother of King Christian I of Denmark, who was the "semi-Salic" heiress of her brother Adolf of Schauenburg, last Schauenburg duke of Schleswig and count of Holstein. As such, Prince Christian was eligible to succeed in the twin duchies of Schleswig-Holstein, but not first in line. Through his mother, he was thus a great-grandson of Frederick V, great-great-grandson of George II of Great Britain and a descendant of several other monarchs, but had no direct claim to any European throne.

=== Childhood ===
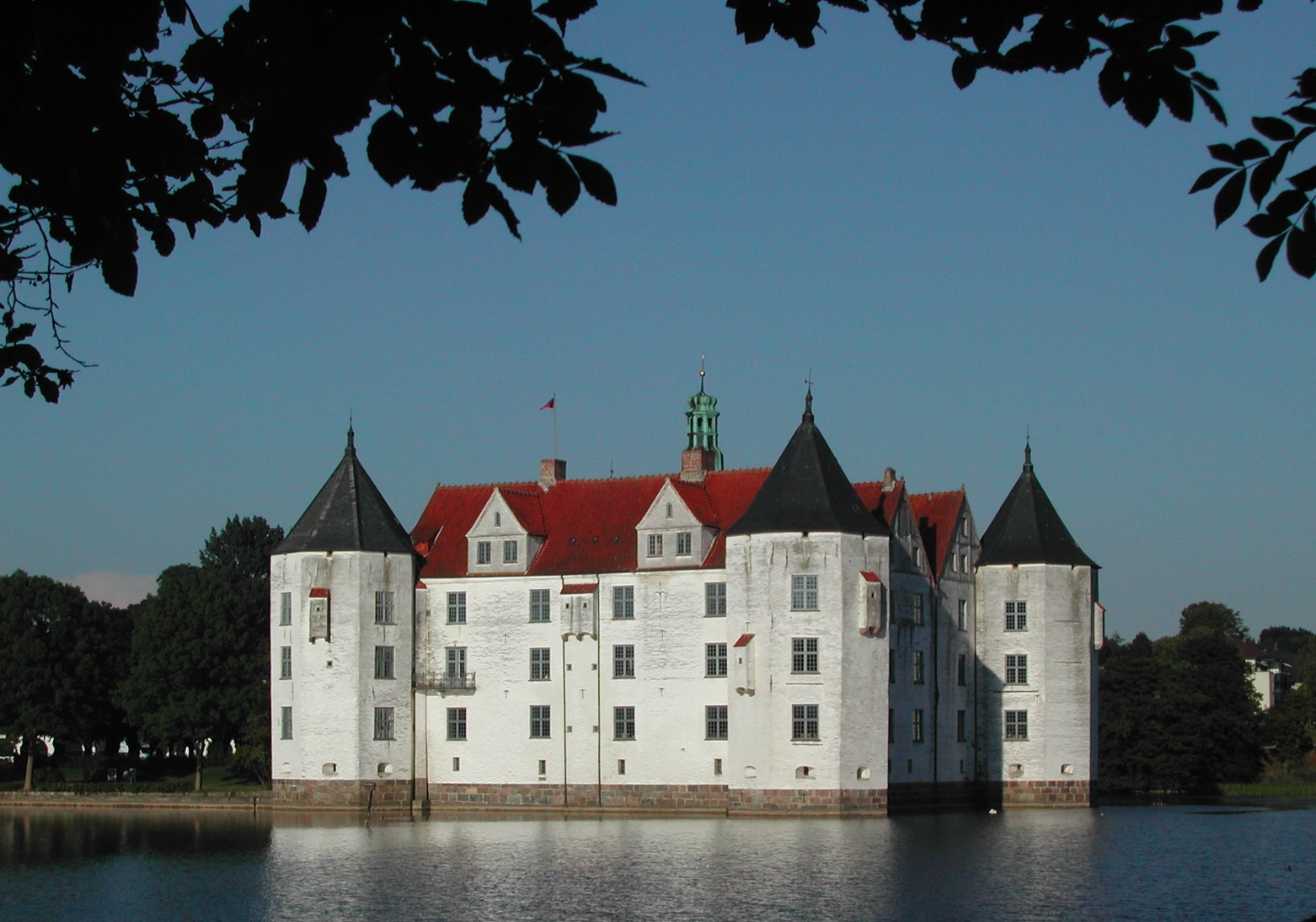
Prince Christian's childhood home, Glücksburg Castle in Schleswig-Holstein, seat of the eponymous ducal branches of the House of Oldenburg (2005).

Initially, the young prince grew up with his parents and many brothers and sisters at his maternal grandparents' residence at Gottorf Castle, the habitual seat of the royal governors of the duchies of Schleswig and Holstein. However, in 1824, the dowager duchess of Glücksburg, widow of Frederick Henry William, the last duke of the elder line of the house Schleswig-Holstein-Sønderborg-Glücksburg, who had himself died in 1779, died. Glücksburg Castle, located a little south of Flensburg Fjord, not far from city of Flensburg, was now empty, and on 6 July 1825, Duke Friedrich Wilhelm was appointed Duke of Glücksburg by his brother-in-law, King Frederick VI of Denmark. Duke Friedrich Wilhelm subsequently changed his title to Duke of Schleswig-Holstein-Sonderburg-Glücksburg and thus founded the younger Glücksburg line.

Subsequently, the family moved to Glücksburg Castle, where Prince Christian was raised with his siblings under their father's supervision. The Duke wrote to a friend:

I raise my sons with rigor, that these may learn to obey, without, however, failing to make them available to the requirements and demands of the present.

However, Duke Friedrich Wilhelm died of a cold that had developed into pneumonia at the age of just 46 on 17 February 1831 and, at the Duke's own discretion, scarlet fever, which had previously affected two of his children. His death left the duchess widowed with ten children and no money. Prince Christian was twelve years old when his father died.

=== Education ===
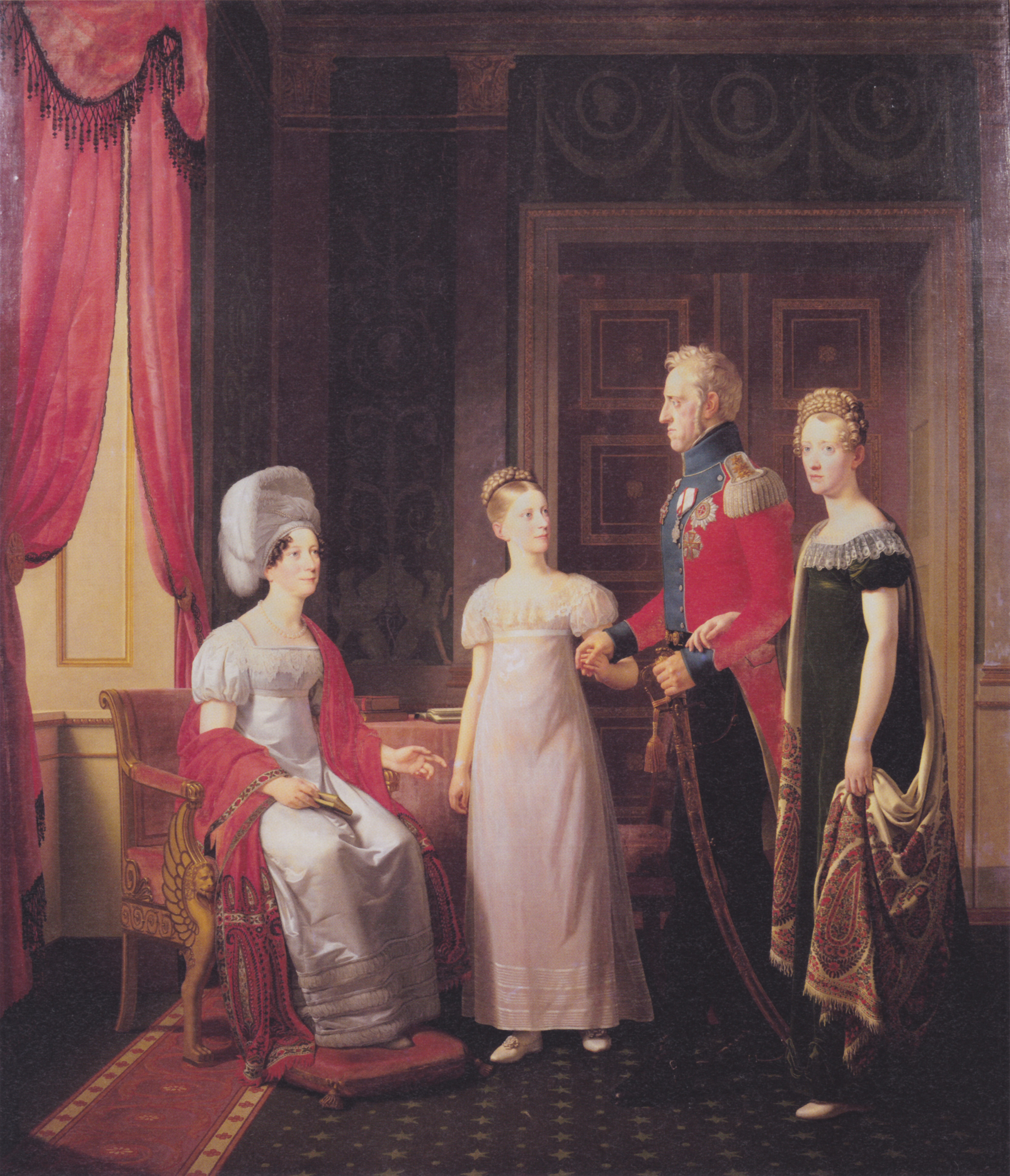
Prince Christian's surrogate father, Frederick VI of Denmark, whose queen Marie of Hesse-Kassel was his aunt and the two princesses his cousins.

Following the early death of his father, King Frederick VI, together with Prince William of Hesse-Philippstal-Barchfeld, a close friend of the Duke, became legal guardians of Prince Christian and his nine siblings. That same year, Prince Christian wanted to be educated as a naval officer, but during King Frederick VI's visit to Gottorp in 1831, shortly after Duke Wilhelm's funeral, the king agreed with his mother that Prince Christian would be sent to Copenhagen to receive an army officer training. Subsequently, in 1832, the year after his father's death, the 14-year-old Prince Christian moved to Copenhagen to be educated at the Land Cadet Academy, where he stayed at the house of Colonel Linde, the head of the Land Cadet Academy. He received private lessons at the academy and was rarely with the other cadets. On the other hand, the sonless royal couple took good care of the boy, as Queen Marie was his mother's sister and King Frederick VI his mother's cousin. Also, in 1838, Prince Christian's eldest brother, Duke Karl of Glücksborg, married the king and queen's youngest daughter, Princess Vilhelmine Marie, which further strengthened the bonds between them.

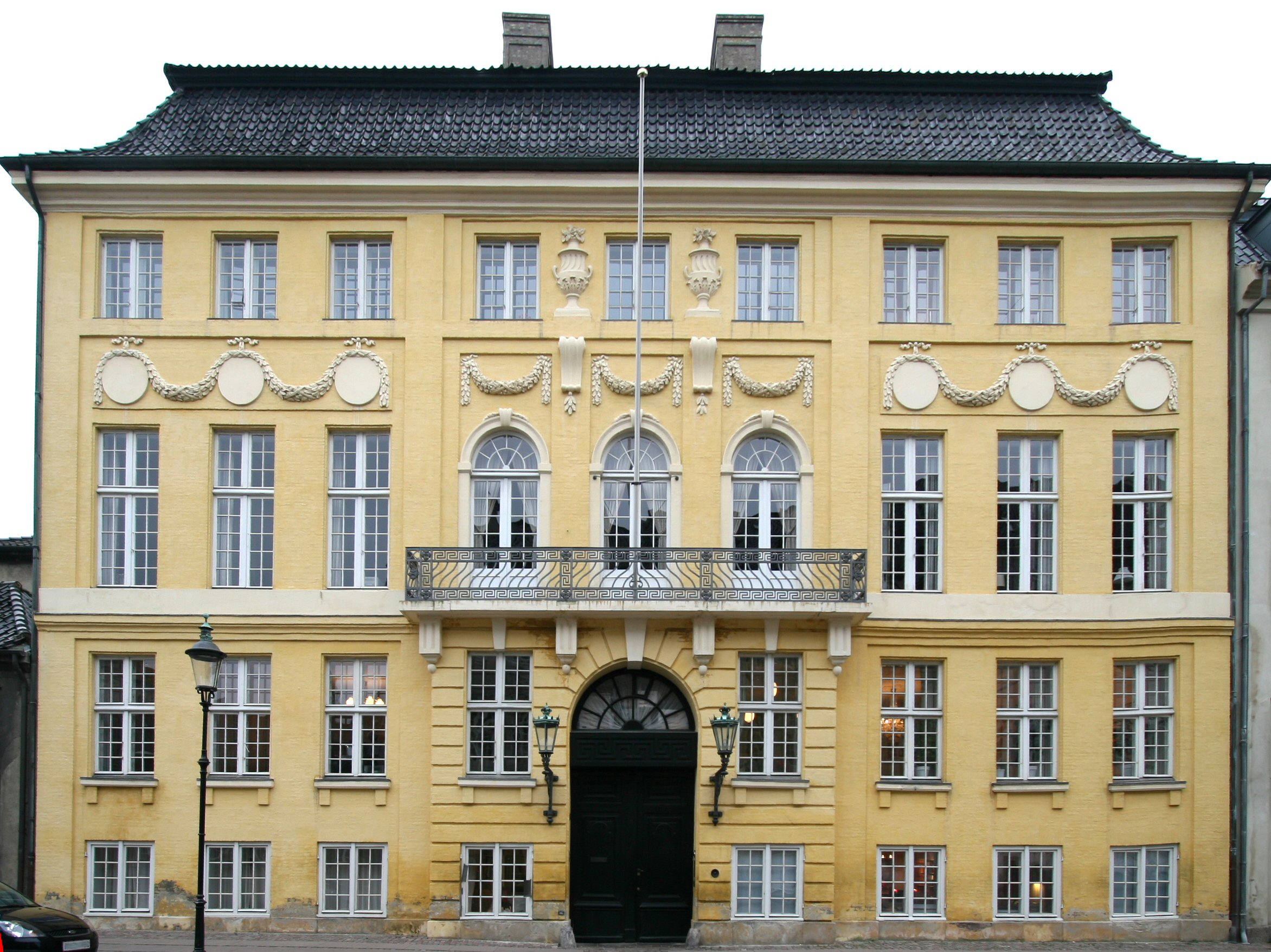
Prince Christian's longtime home, the Yellow Palace in Copenhagen (2006).

In 1835, Prince Christian was confirmed in the Garrison Church in Copenhagen. The following year, after completing his military education, he was appointed rittmeister at the Royal Horse Guards and was then housed in the Royal Horse Guards Barracks by Frederiksholms Kanal in central Copenhagen. There he lived under simple conditions until King Frederick VI in 1839 granted him a home in the Yellow Palace, an 18th-century town house at 18 Amaliegade, immediately adjacent to the Amalienborg Palace complex, the principal residence of the Danish royal family in the district of Frederiksstaden in central Copenhagen, where he came to live until 1865.

From 1839 to 1841, Prince Christian studied constitutional law and history with his half-cousin Prince Frederick William of Hesse-Kassel at the University of Bonn in Germany. It was there that in December 1839 he received the news of the death of his benefactor King Frederick VI and the accession of his mother's cousin, King Christian VIII. During the holidays he went on various excursions in Germany and also traveled to Venice. In 1841 he returned to Copenhagen. On the way home, he paid a visit to the court in Berlin, where he rejected an otherwise flattering offer from King Frederick William IV of Prussia to join the Prussian Army.

== Becoming the heir presumptive ==
=== Marriage ===
As a young man, in 1838, Prince Christian, representing Frederick VI, attended the coronation of Queen Victoria at Westminster Abbey. During his stay in London, he unsuccessfully sought the hand of the young British queen in marriage. Even though she chose to follow her family's wishes and preferred to marry her cousin, Prince Albert of Saxe-Coburg and Gotha, the young queen had a good impression of her third cousin Prince Christian, who 25 years later would become father-in-law to her eldest son, the Prince of Wales.

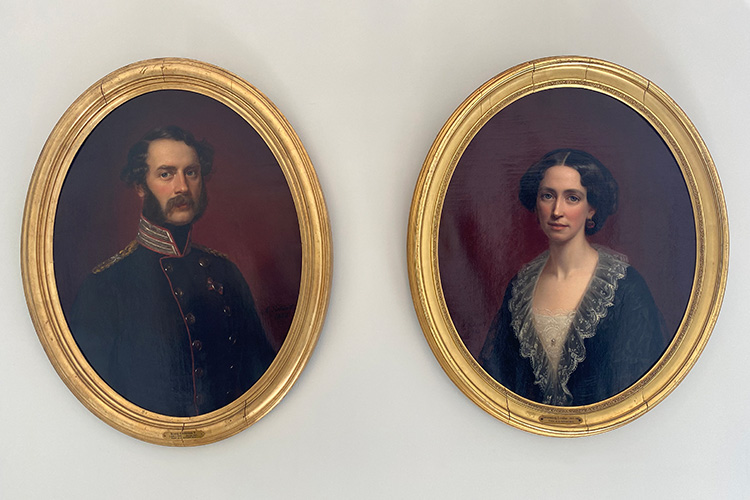
Prince Christian and Princess Louise in the 1840s.

Instead, Prince Christian entered into a marriage that was to have great significance for his future. In 1841, he was engaged to his second cousin Princess Louise of Hesse-Kassel. She was the daughter of Prince William of Hesse-Kassel, who was a Danish general and the governor of Copenhagen. Prince William was married to Christian VIII's sister Princess Charlotte of Denmark, and Louise was thus the new king's niece and was closely related to the royal family. Like Prince Christian himself, she was a great-granddaughter of both Frederick V of Denmark and Landgrave Frederick II of Hesse-Kassel, and thus his double second cousin. Their wedding was celebrated on 26 May 1842 in her parents' residence in Frederick VIII's Palace at Amalienborg. The bride and groom took their bridal tour to Kiel in the Duchy of Holstein, where they visited Prince Christian's older brother, Duke Karl of Glücksburg, and his wife, Frederick VI's daughter Princess Vilhelmine Marie, who had not been able to attend the wedding.

Louise was a wise and energetic woman who exercised a strong influence over her husband. After the wedding, the couple moved into the Yellow Palace, where their first five children were born between 1843 and 1853: Prince Frederick in 1843, Princess Alexandra in 1844, Prince William in 1845, Princess Dagmar in 1847 and Princess Thyra in 1853. The family was still quite unknown and lived a relatively modest life by royal standards.

=== The Danish succession crisis ===
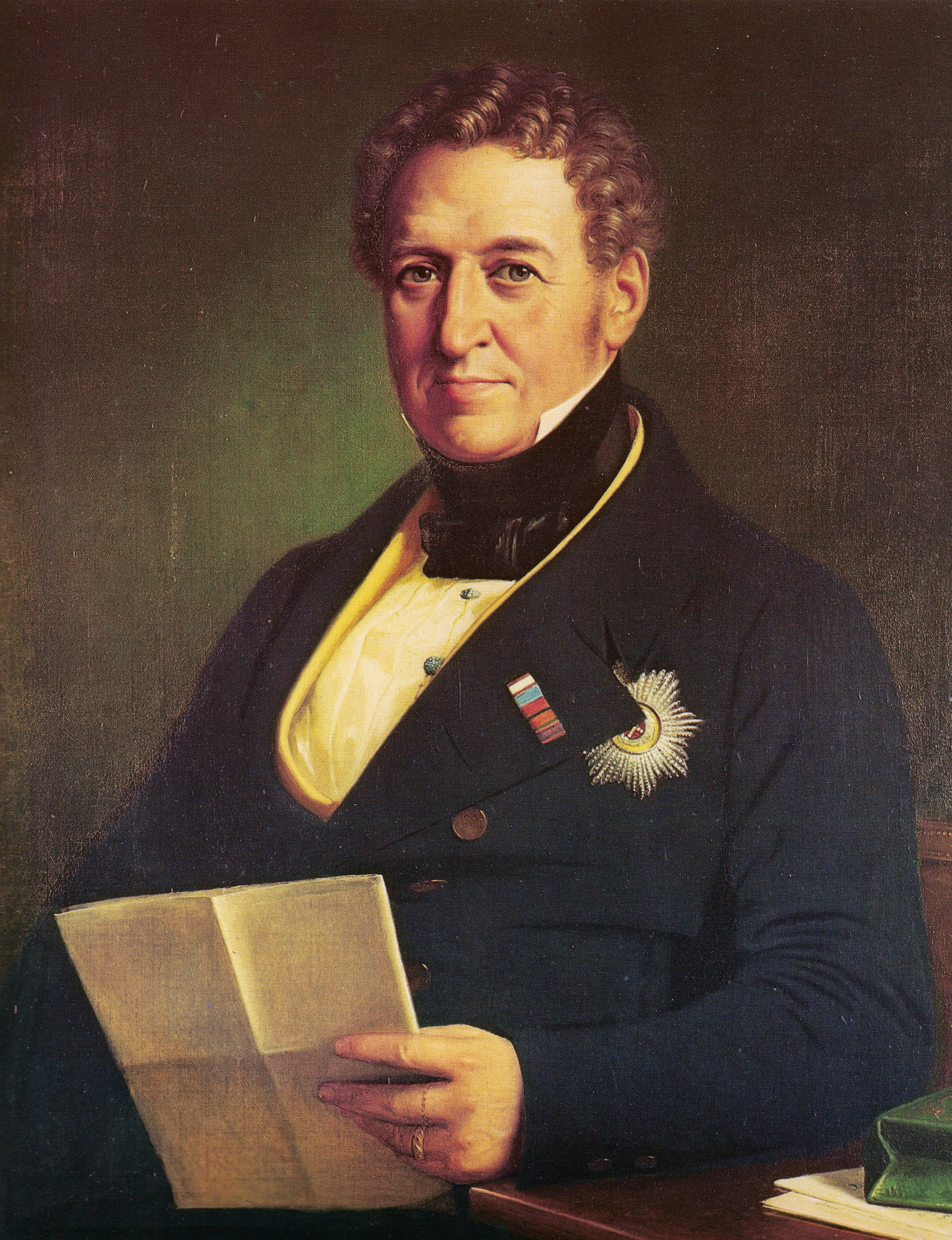
Princess Louise's uncle, Christian VIII, faced a complex succession crisis during his reign.

In the 1840s, it became increasingly clear that the Danish monarchy was facing a succession crisis. When King Christian VIII succeeded his first cousin King Frederick VI in 1839, the elder male line of the House of Oldenburg was obviously on the point of extinction, as the king's only son and heir apparent Crown Prince Frederick seemed incapable of fathering children and the king's only brother Prince Ferdinand's marriage to King Frederick VI's daughter was childless. King Frederick VII's childlessness presented a thorny dilemma and the question of succession to the Danish throne proved complex, as the rules of succession in the different parts of the Danish monarchy united under the king's rule, the Kingdom of Denmark proper and the three duchies of Schleswig, Holstein and Saxe-Lauenburg, not being the same, the possibility of a separation of the crown of Denmark from its duchies became probable.

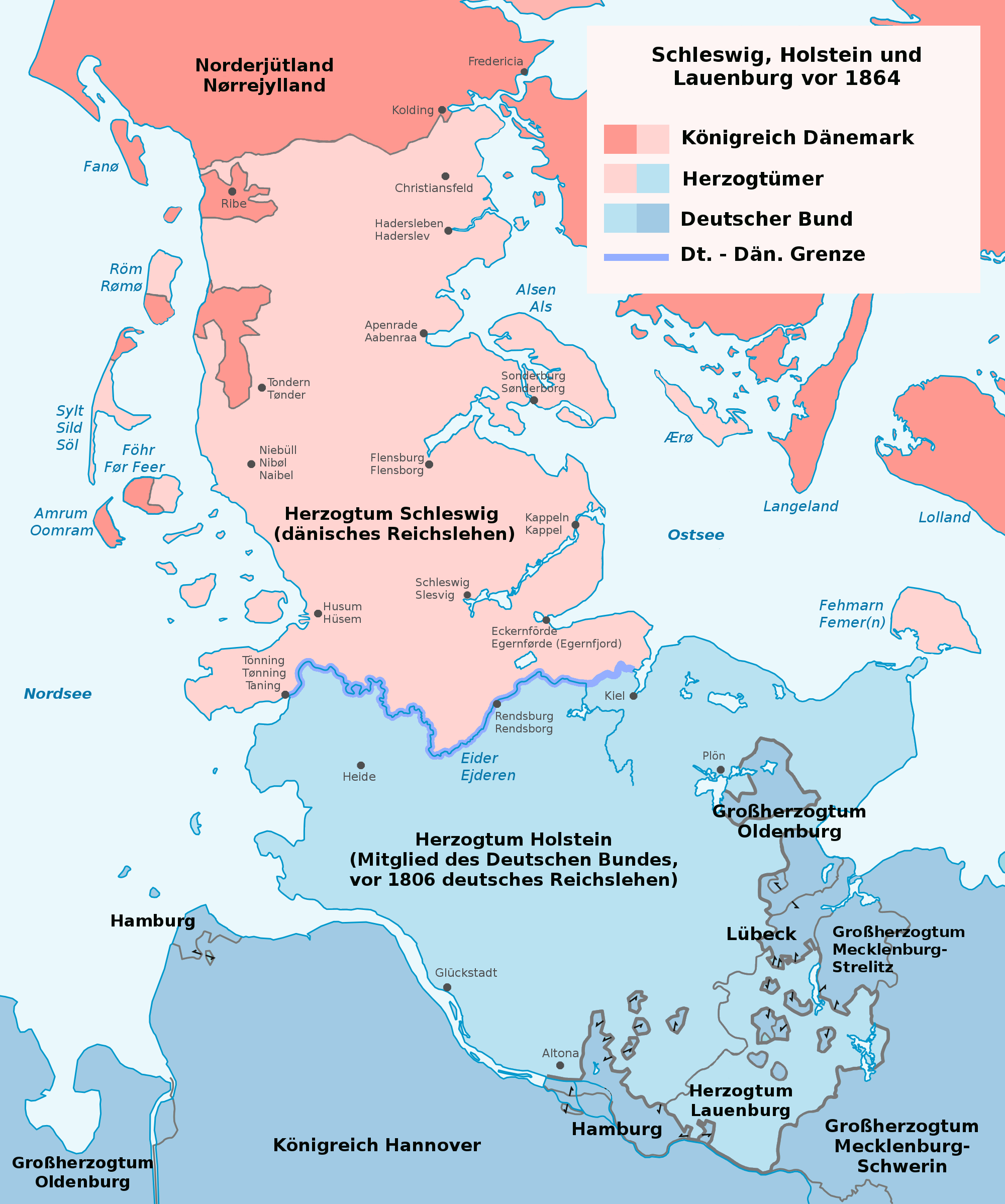
The duchies of Schleswig, Holstein and Lauenburg before 1864.

The succession in the Kingdom of Denmark was regulated by the Lex Regia (Danish: Kongeloven; Law of The King), the absolutist constitution of Denmark and Norway promulgated by Frederick III in 1665. With the Lex Regia, Denmark had adopted the Salic law, but restricted the succession to the agnatic descendants of Frederick III, who was the first hereditary monarch of Denmark (before him, the kingdom was officially elective). Agnatic descent from Frederick III would end with the death of the childless Frederick VII and his equally childless uncle, Prince Ferdinand. At that point, the Lex Regia provided for a semi-Salic succession, which stipulated that after the extinction of all-male descendance, including all collateral male lines, a female agnate (such as a daughter) of the last male holder of the property would inherit, and after her, her own male heirs according to the Salic order. There were, however, several ways to interpret to whom the crown could pass, since the provision was not entirely clear as to whether a claimant to the throne could be the closest female relative or not. In the duchy of Holstein, where the king reigned as duke, the rules of succession also followed the Salic law, but did not limit the succession to the agnatic descendants of Frederick III. As there were several junior male lines of the House of Oldenburg, who were however not descendants of Frederick III, there were thus numerous agnatic descendants with succession rights in the Duchy of Holstein, who were however not eligible to succeed to the Danish throne. In addition, the two duchies of Schleswig and Holstein were permanently joined to each other by the Treaty of Ribe of 1460, which proclaimed that the two duchies should be "Forever Undivided".

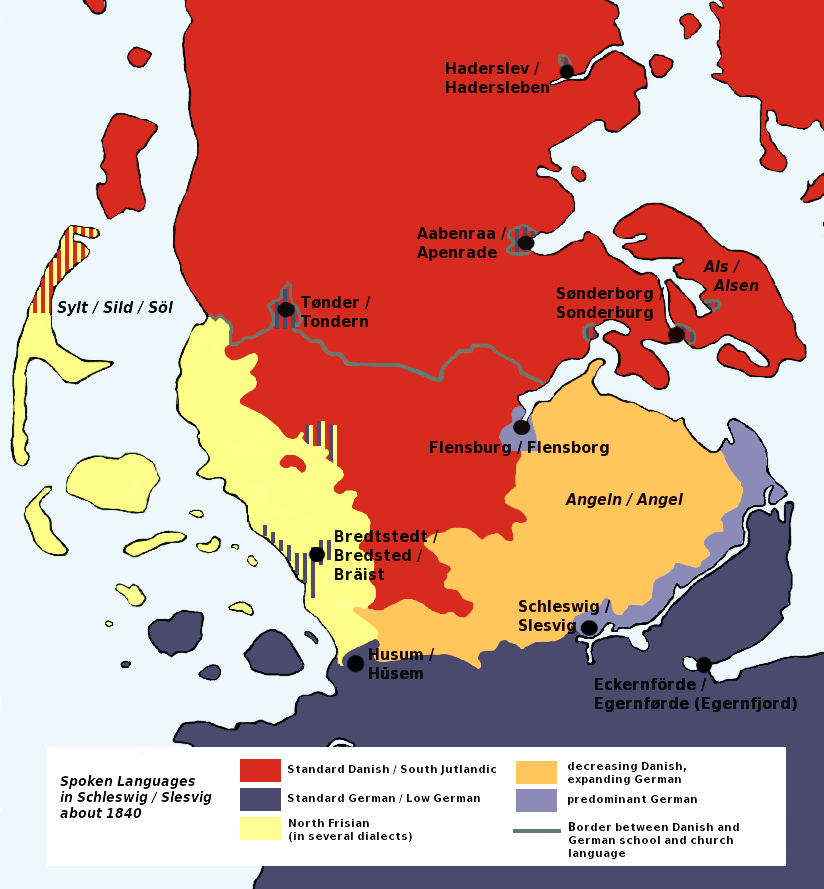
The linguistic distribution in the Duchy of Schleswig around 1840.

The already complicated dynastic question of the succession was made even more complex as it took place against a background of equally complicated political issues. The movements of nationalism and liberalism had been on the rise in Europe since the Napoleonic era. Whereas the concepts of nation and homeland increasingly replaced dynastic questions for the nationalists, aristocratic privileges and the concept of an absolute ruler of divine right were poorly accepted by the liberals. Denmark and the Duchies were no exception, and the political movement of national liberalism had been on the rise since the 1830s. While the Danish and German national liberals were united in their liberal political aspirations and in their opposition to the absolutist rule of the House of Oldenburg, the two political movements were heavily opposed in the national question. It mainly concerned the question of the affiliation of the Duchy of Schleswig. Constitutionally, the Duchy of Schleswig was a Danish fief, which had become increasingly independent from Denmark during the High Middle Ages. Linguistically, however, Danish, German and North Frisian existed as vernaculars in different parts of the Duchy, and German functioned as the language of law and the ruling class.

The Danish national liberals insisted that Schleswig as a fief had belonged to Denmark for centuries and aimed to restore the southern frontier of Denmark on the Eider river, the historic border between Schleswig and Holstein. The Danish nationalists thus aspired to incorporate the Duchy of Schleswig into the Danish kingdom, in the process separating it from the duchy of Holstein, which should be allowed to pursue its own destiny as a member of the German Confederation or possibly a new united Germany. With the claim of the total integration of Schleswig into the Danish kingdom, the Danish national liberals opposed the German national liberals, whose goal was the union of the duchies of Schleswig and Holstein, their joint independence from Denmark and their membership in the German Confederation as an autonomous German state. The German nationalists thus sought to confirm Schleswig's association with Holstein, in the process detaching Schleswig from Denmark and bringing it into the German Confederation.

There was burgeoning nationalism within both Denmark and the German-speaking parts of Schleswig-Holstein. This meant that a resolution to keep the two Duchies together and as a part of the Danish kingdom could not satisfy the conflicting interests of both Danish and German nationalists, and hindered all hopes of a peaceful solution.

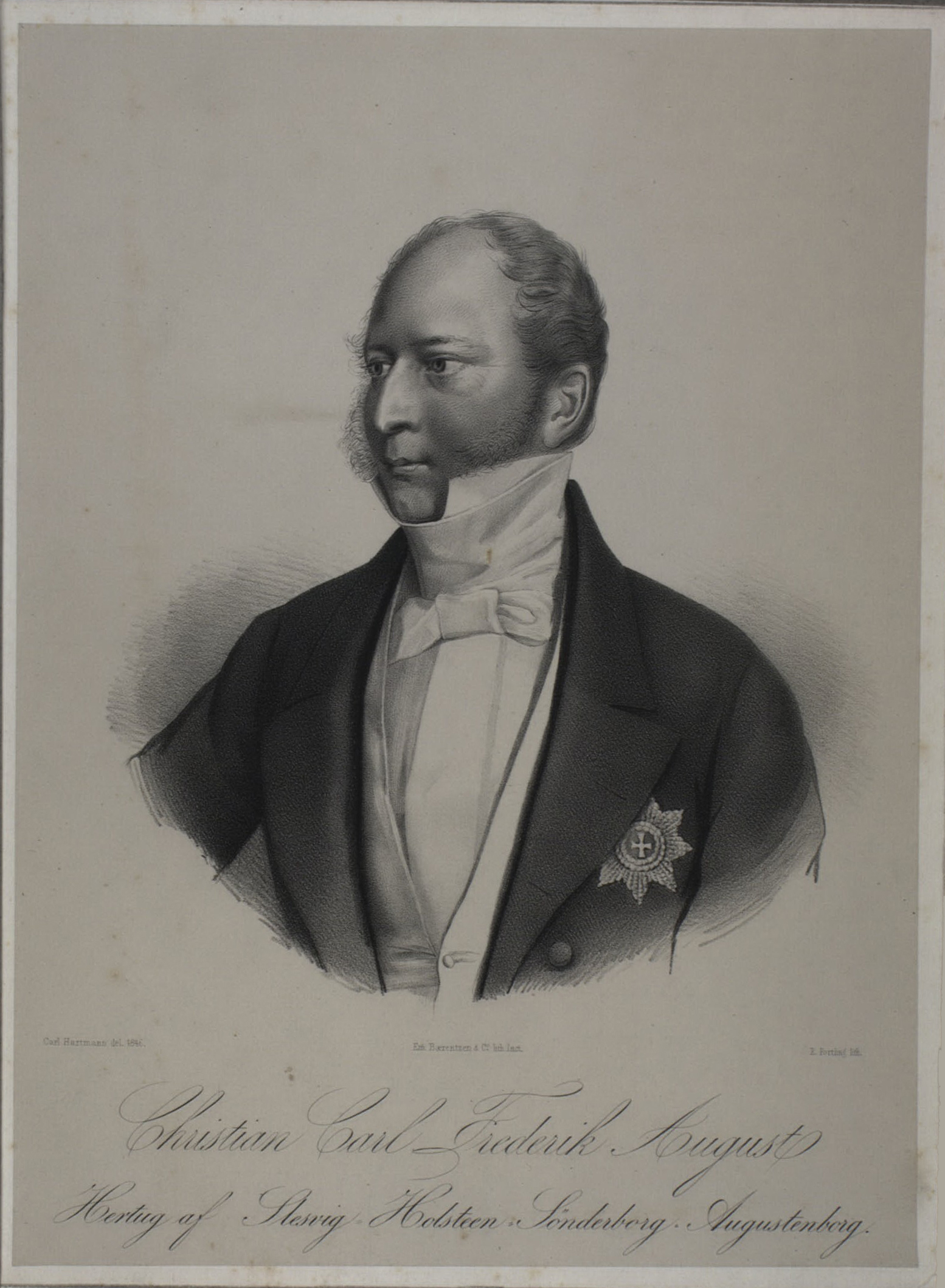
Christian August II, Duke of Schleswig-Holstein-Sonderburg-Augustenburg, pretender to the duchies during the succession crisis.

As the nations of Europe looked on, the numerous descendants of Hedvig of Holstein began to vie for the Danish throne. Frederick VII belonged to the senior branch of Hedvig's descendants. In the event of extinction of the senior branch, the house of Schleswig-Holstein-Sonderburg-Augustenburg would become the most senior branch of the House of Oldenburg, but it did not descend from King Frederick III. However, in the duchies, Christian August II, Duke of Schleswig-Holstein-Sonderburg-Augustenburg, claimed the position of heir to the throne of the duchies of Schleswig and Holstein, being head of the house of Augustenburg, and thus became a symbol of the nationalist German independence movement in Schleswig-Holstein.

The closest female relatives of Frederick VII were his paternal aunt, Princess Louise Charlotte of Denmark, who had married a scion of the cadet branch of the House of Hesse, and her children. However, they were not agnatic descendants of the royal family, so were not eligible to succeed in Schleswig-Holstein.

The dynastic female heir reckoned most eligible according to the original law of primogeniture of Frederick III was Princess Caroline of Denmark (1793–1881), the childless eldest daughter of the late king Frederick VI. Along with another childless daughter, Princess Vilhelmine Marie of Denmark (1808–1891), Duchess of Glücksburg; the next heir was Louise, sister of Frederick VI, who had married the Duke of Augustenburg. The chief heir to that line was the selfsame Frederick of Augustenburg, but his turn would have come only after the death of two childless princesses who were very much alive in 1863.

The House of Glücksburg also held a significant interest in the succession to the throne. A more junior branch of the royal family, they were also descendants of Frederick III through the daughter of King Frederick V of Denmark. Lastly, there was yet a more junior agnatic branch that was eligible to succeed in Schleswig-Holstein. There was Christian himself and his three older brothers, the eldest of whom, Karl, was childless, but the others had produced children, and male children at that.

Prince Christian had been a foster "grandson" of the grandchildless royal couple Frederick VI and his Queen consort Marie (Marie Sophie Friederike of Hesse). Familiar with the royal court and the traditions of the recent monarchs, their young ward Prince Christian was a nephew of Queen Marie and a first cousin once removed of Frederick VI. He had been brought up as a Dane, having lived in Danish-speaking lands of the royal dynasty and not having become a German nationalist, which made him a relatively good candidate from the Danish point of view. As junior agnatic descendant, he was eligible to inherit Schleswig-Holstein, but was not the first in line. As a descendant of Frederick III, he was eligible to succeed in Denmark, although here too, he was not first in line.

Family of Christian IX
– Kings of Denmark
– Dukes of Schleswig-Holstein-Sonderburg
– Dukes of Schleswig-Holstein-Sonderburg-Augustenburg
– Dukes of Schleswig-Holstein-Sonderburg-Beck

Christian III of Denmark
Frederick II of Denmark | John II
Christian IV of Denmark | Alexander
Frederick III of Denmark | Ernest Günther | August Philipp
Christian V of Denmark | Prince Frederick William of Schleswig-Holstein-Sonderburg-Augustenburg | Frederick Louis
Frederick IV of Denmark | Christian August | Peter August
Christian VI of Denmark | Frederick Christian I | Prince Karl Anton August of Schleswig-Holstein-Sonderburg-Beck
Frederick V of Denmark | Frederick Christian II | Friedrich Karl Ludwig
Christian VII of Denmark | Princess Louise of Denmark (1750–1831) | Frederick, Hereditary Prince of Denmark | Friedrich Wilhelm
Frederick VI of Denmark | Princess Louise Auguste of Denmark | Princess Louise Caroline of Hesse-Kassel | Christian VIII of Denmark | Princess Louise Charlotte of Denmark
Princess Caroline of Denmark | Christian August II | (Prince Christian); CHRISTIAN IX OF DENMARK | Frederick VII of Denmark | Louise of Hesse-Kassel

House of Oldenburg, 1863

=== Appointment as an heir presumptive ===
Prince Christian as heir presumptive with his children Dagmar, William and Alexandra in 1861.

In 1851, the Russian emperor recommended that Prince Christian advance in the Danish succession. And in 1852, the thorny question of Denmark's succession was finally resolved by the London Protocol of 8 May 1852, signed by the United Kingdom, France, Russia, Prussia and Austria, and ratified by Denmark and Sweden. Christian was chosen as heir presumptive to the throne after Frederick VII's uncle, and thus would become king after the extinction of the most senior line to the Danish throne. A justification for this choice was his marriage to Louise of Hesse-Kassel, who as daughter of the closest female relative of Frederick VII was closely related to the royal family. Louise's mother and brother, and elder sister too, renounced their rights in favor of Louise and her husband. Prince Christian's wife was thereafter the closest female heiress of Frederick VII.

The decision was implemented by the Danish Law of Succession of 31 July 1853—more precisely, the Royal Ordinance settling the Succession to the Crown on Prince Christian of Glücksburg which designated him as second-in-line to the Danish throne following King Frederick VII's uncle. Consequently, Prince Christian and his family were granted the titles of Prince and Princess of Denmark and the style of Highness.

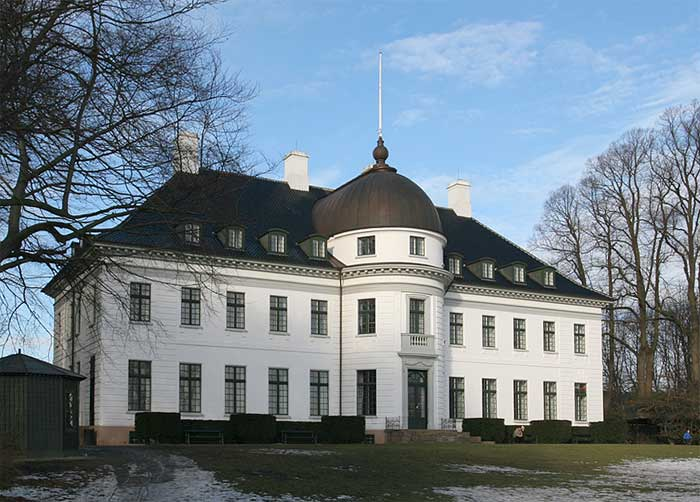
Bernstorff Palace, Prince Christian's summer residence as heir presumptive (2006).

As second in line, Prince Christian continued to live in the Yellow Palace with his family. However, as a consequence of their new status, the family were also granted the right to use Bernstorff Palace north of Copenhagen as their summer residence. It became Princess Louise's favorite residence, and the family often stayed there. It was also at Bernstorff that their youngest son, Prince Valdemar, was born in 1858. At the occasion of Prince Valdemar's baptism, Prince Christian and his family were granted the style of Royal Highness. Although their economy had improved, the financial situation of the family was still relatively strained.

However, Prince Christian's appointment as successor to the throne was not met with undivided enthusiasm. His relationship with the king was cool, partly because the colorful King Frederick VII did not like the straightforward, military prince, and had preferred to see Christian's eldest son, the young Prince Frederick, take his place, partly because Prince Christian and Princess Louise openly showed their disapproval of the king's morganatic third wife, the actress Louise Rasmussen, who received the title Countess Danner. Politically, Prince Christian also had little influence during his tenure as second-in-line. This was partly due to the distrust of the Countess Danner, partly due to Christian's perceived conservatism, which earned him the distrust of the powerful National Liberal Party. It was not before 1856 that the politician Carl Christoffer Georg Andræ, to whom Prince Christian always felt close, secured him a seat in the Council of State.

The year 1863 became rich in significant events for Prince Christian and his family. On 10 March, his eldest daughter, Princess Alexandra married the Prince of Wales (the future King Edward VII of the United Kingdom). On 20 March, his second son, Prince William was elected King of the Hellenes and ascended the Greek throne taking the name of King George I. And in June 1863, Prince Christian himself became heir-presumptive upon the death of the elderly Prince Ferdinand before eventually becoming King Christian IX on 15 November that year.

== Early reign ==
=== Accession ===
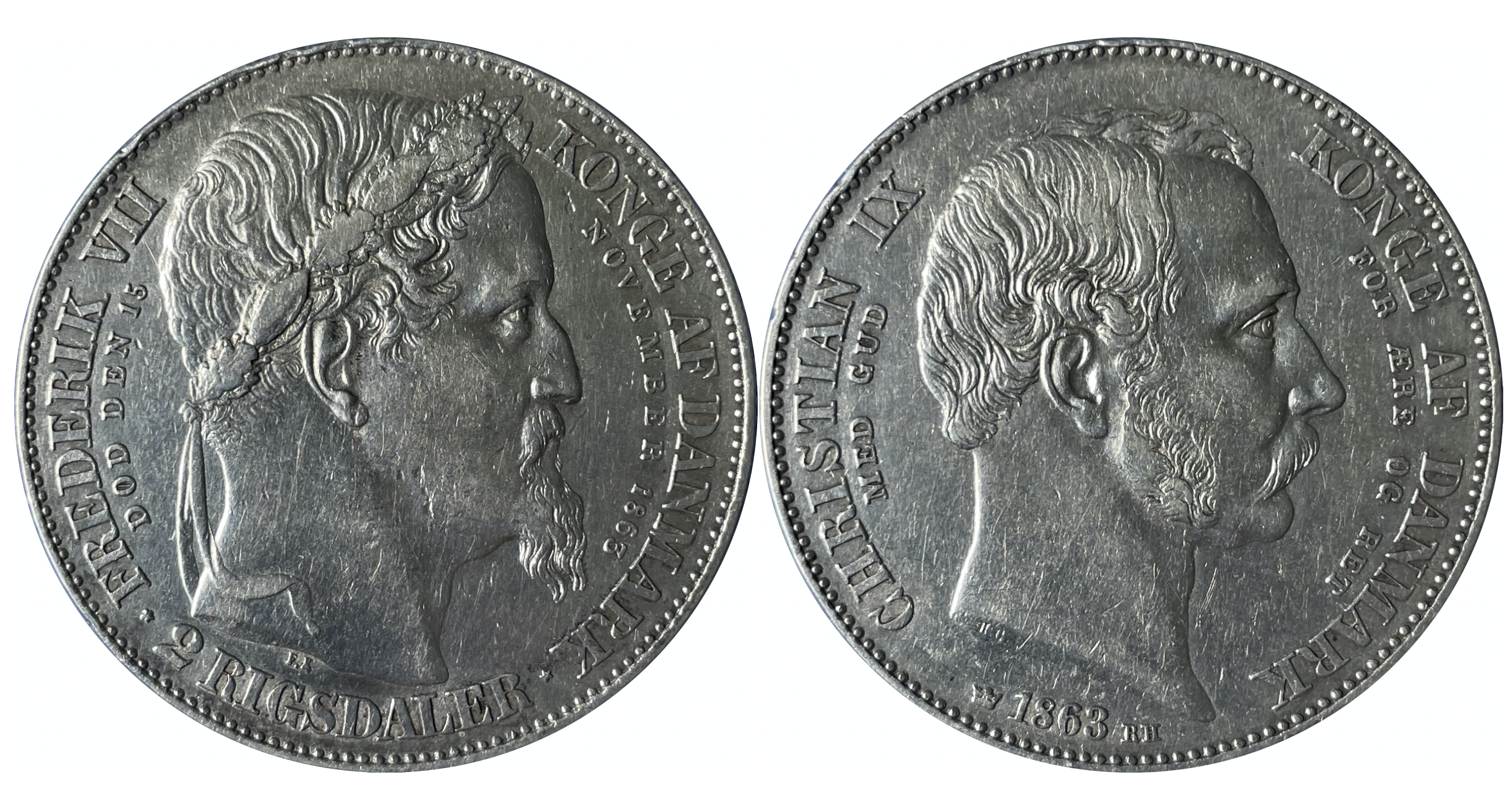
2 rigsdaler – death of Frederick VII and accession of Christian IX

During the last years of the reign of King Frederick VII, his health was increasingly poor, and in the autumn of 1863, during a visit to the Danevirke fortification, he contracted a severe cold, which after his return to Glücksburg Castle turned into erysipelas. Shortly after, on 15 November, King Frederick VII died unexpectedly at the age of 55 after a sixteen-year reign, thus ending the 415-year reign of the main line of the House of Oldenburg on the Danish throne. Upon the death of Frederick VII, Christian succeeded to the throne at the age of 45. He was proclaimed king from the balcony of Christiansborg Palace by the Council president Carl Christian Hall on 16 November 1863 as Christian IX.

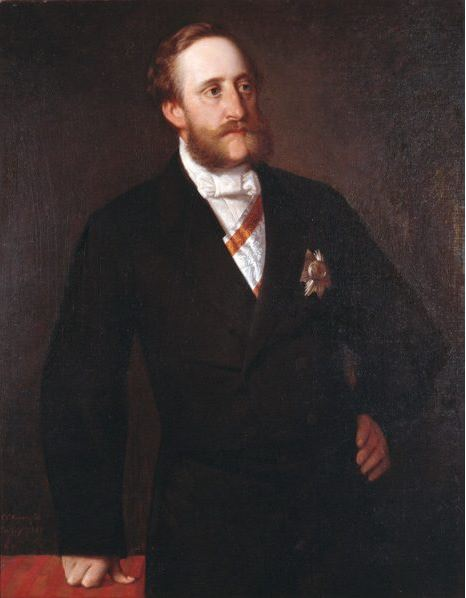
Prince Frederick of Augustenburg, pretender to the duchies as Frederick VIII (1863).

Christian and Denmark was immediately plunged into a crisis over the possession and status of the duchies of Schleswig and Holstein. Already in November 1863, Prince Frederick of Schleswig-Holstein-Sonderburg-Augustenburg (1829–1880) (the future father-in-law of Kaiser Wilhelm II of Germany) claimed the twin-duchies in succession after King Frederick VII and proclaimed himself Frederick VIII, Duke of Schleswig-Holstein. Frederick of Augustenburg (as he was commonly known) had become the symbol of the nationalist German independence movement in Schleswig-Holstein after his father (in exchange for money) renounced his claims as heir to the throne of the duchies of Schleswig and Holstein. In view of the London protocol of 8 May 1852, which concluded the First War of Schleswig, and his father's concurrent renunciation to claims to the throne, Frederick's claim was not recognized by the parties to the protocol.

=== Second Schleswig War ===
Under pressure, Christian signed the November Constitution, a treaty that made Schleswig part of Denmark. This resulted in the Second Schleswig War between Denmark and a Prussian/Austrian alliance in 1864. The Peace Conference broke up without having arrived at any conclusion; the outcome of the war was unfavorable to Denmark and led to the incorporation of Schleswig into Prussia in 1865. Holstein was likewise incorporated into Austria in 1865, then Prussia in 1866, following further conflict between Austria and Prussia.

Following the loss, Christian IX went behind the backs of the Danish government to contact the Prussians, proposing that the whole of Denmark could join the German Confederation, if Denmark could stay united with Schleswig and Holstein. This proposal was rejected by Otto von Bismarck, who feared that the ethnic strife in Schleswig between Danes and Germans would then stay unresolved. Christian IX's negotiations were not publicly known until published in the 2010 book Dommedag Als by Tom Buk-Swienty, who had been given access to the royal archives by Queen Margrethe II.

== Later reign ==
=== Constitutional struggle ===
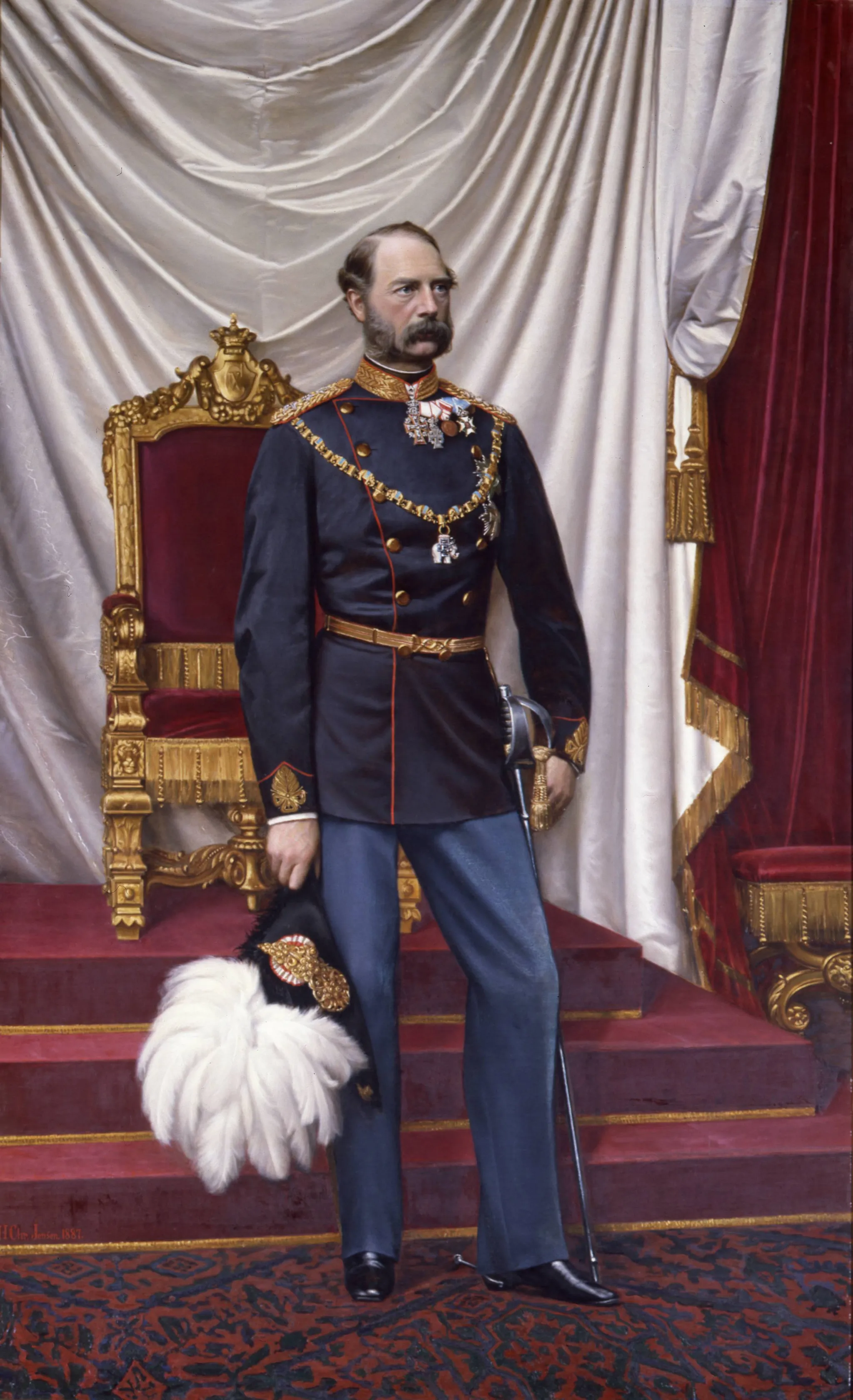
Portrait by Hans Christian Jensen, 1887

The defeat of 1864 cast a shadow over Christian IX's rule for many years and his attitude to the Danish case was—probably without reason—claimed to be half-hearted. This unpopularity was worsened as he sought unsuccessfully to prevent the spread of democracy throughout Denmark by supporting the authoritarian and conservative prime minister Jacob Estrup, whose rule 1875–94 was by many seen as a semi-dictatorship. However, he signed a treaty in 1874 that allowed Iceland, then a Danish possession, to have its own constitution, albeit one under Danish rule. In 1901, he reluctantly asked Johan Henrik Deuntzer to form a government and this resulted in the formation of the Cabinet of Deuntzer. The cabinet consisted of members of the Venstre Reform Party and was the first Danish government not to include the conservative party Højre, even though Højre never had a majority of the seats in the Folketing. This was the beginning of the Danish tradition of parliamentarism and clearly bettered his reputation for his last years.

Another reform occurred in 1866, when the Danish constitution was revised so that Denmark's upper chamber would have more power than the lower. Social security also took a few steps forward during his reign. Old age pensions were introduced in 1891 and unemployment and family benefits were introduced in 1892.

=== Last years ===
In spite of the King's initial unpopularity and the many years of political strife, where the king was in conflict with large parts of the population, his popularity recovered towards the end of his reign, and he was considered a national icon due to the length of his reign and the high standards of personal morality with which he was identified. The celebration of the golden wedding anniversary of King Christian and Queen Louise in 1892 thus became a great and authentic tribute from the people to the king and queen which contrasted profoundly with the sober marking of their silver wedding anniversary in 1867.

In 1904, the King became aware of the efforts of Einar Holbøll, a postal clerk in Denmark, who conceived the idea of selling Christmas seals at post offices across Denmark to raise badly needed funding to help those afflicted with tuberculosis, which was occurring in alarming proportions in Denmark. The King approved of Holbøll's idea and subsequently the Danish post office produced the world's first Christmas seal, which generated more than $40,000 in funding. The Christmas seal portrayed an image of his wife, Queen Louise.

=== Death and succession ===
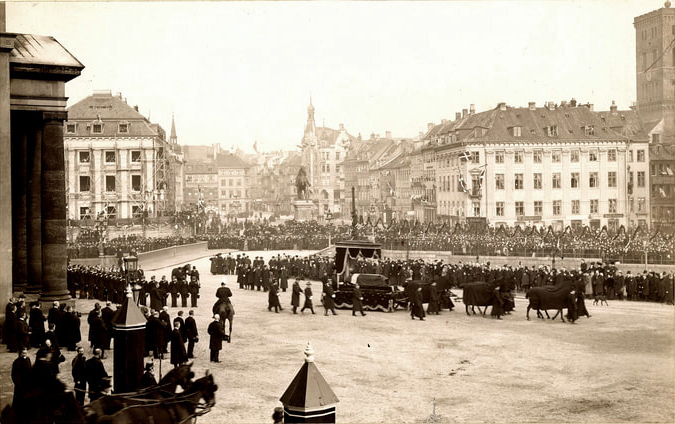
King Christian IX's funeral procession at Christiansborg Palace Square on 16 February 1906.

Queen Louise died at age 81 on 29 September 1898 at Bernstorff Palace near Copenhagen. King Christian IX survived his wife by 7 years, and died peacefully of old age, at age 87, on 29 January 1906 at his residence, Christian IX's Palace at Amalienborg Palace in Copenhagen, after a reign of 42 years and 75 days. After lying in state at the chapel at Christiansborg Palace in Copenhagen, he was interred on 16 February 1906 beside Queen Louise in Christian IX's Chapel in Roskilde Cathedral on the island of Zealand, the traditional burial site for Danish monarchs since the 15th century.

After his death, a competition was announced for a double sarcophagus for him and Queen Louise to be placed in Frederick V's Chapel. The competition was won by the artist Jens Ferdinand Willumsen, but his proposal was deemed too controversial and was not accepted. Instead, two completely different artists were assigned the task, the Dano-Icelandic sculptor Edvard Eriksen and the Danish architect Hack Kampmann. They created a large sarcophagus in white marble flanked by three graceful sculptures symbolizing Remembrance, Love and Grief.

Upon King Christian IX's death, Crown Prince Frederick ascended the throne at the age of 62 as King Frederick VIII.

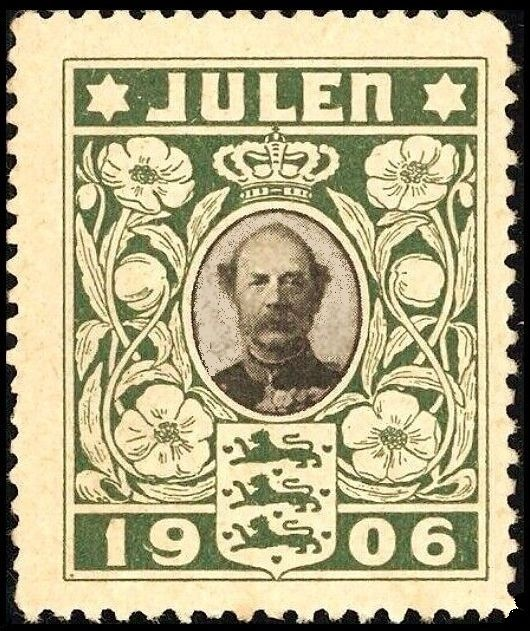
Christian IX appeared on a Denmark Christmas seal, issued the same year as his death in 1906

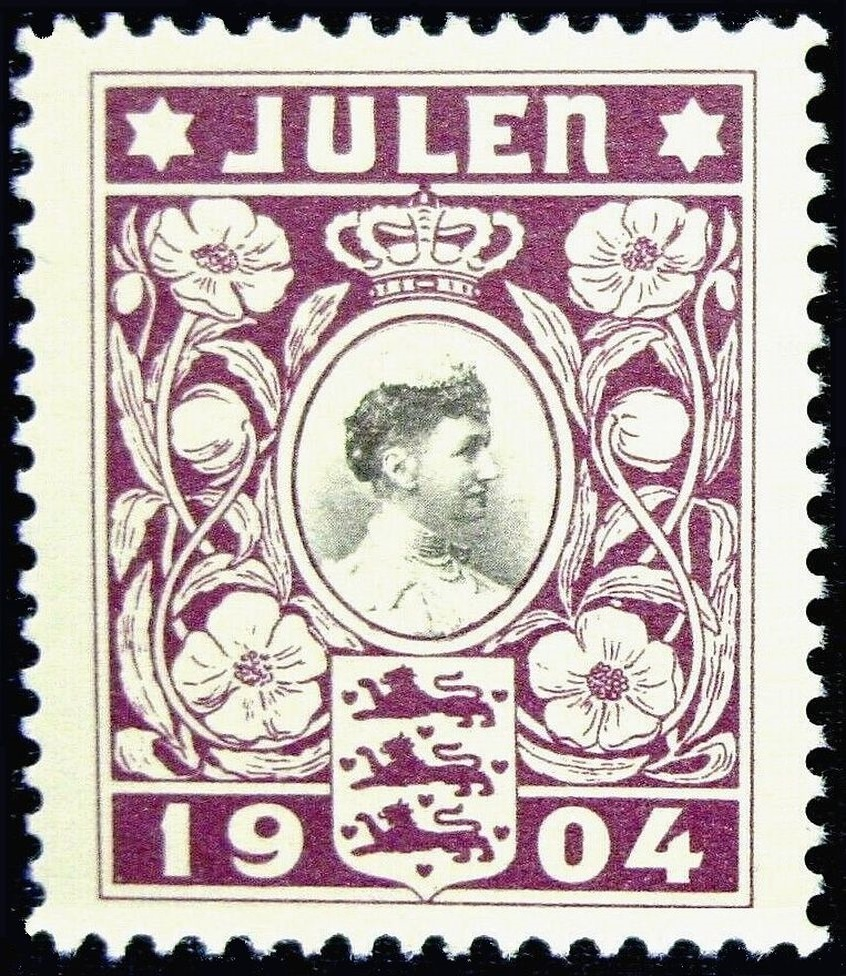
Queen Louise on the Danish Christmas seal of 1904, the world's first Christmas seal

== Legacy ==
=== "Father-in-law of Europe" ===
Christian's family links with Europe's royal families earned him the sobriquet "the father-in-law of Europe". Four of Christian's children sat on the thrones (either as monarchs or as consorts) of Denmark, Greece, the United Kingdom and Russia. His youngest son, Valdemar, was on 10 November 1886 elected as new Prince of Bulgaria by The 3rd Grand National Assembly of Bulgaria, but Christian IX refused to allow Prince Valdemar to receive the election.

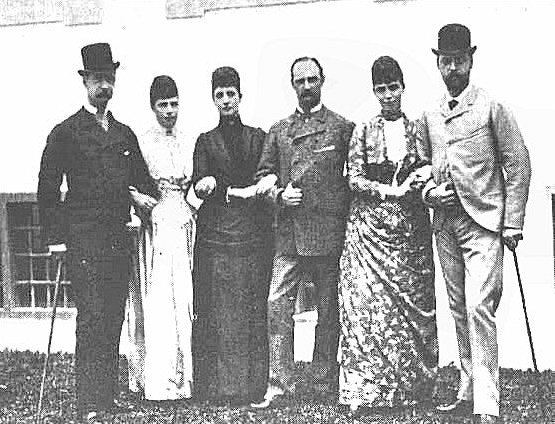
Six children of Christian IX and Queen Louise, 1882. From left: King George I of Greece, Empress Maria Feodorovna of Russia, Alexandra, Princess of Wales, Crown Prince Frederick of Denmark, Princess Thyra and Prince Valdemar.

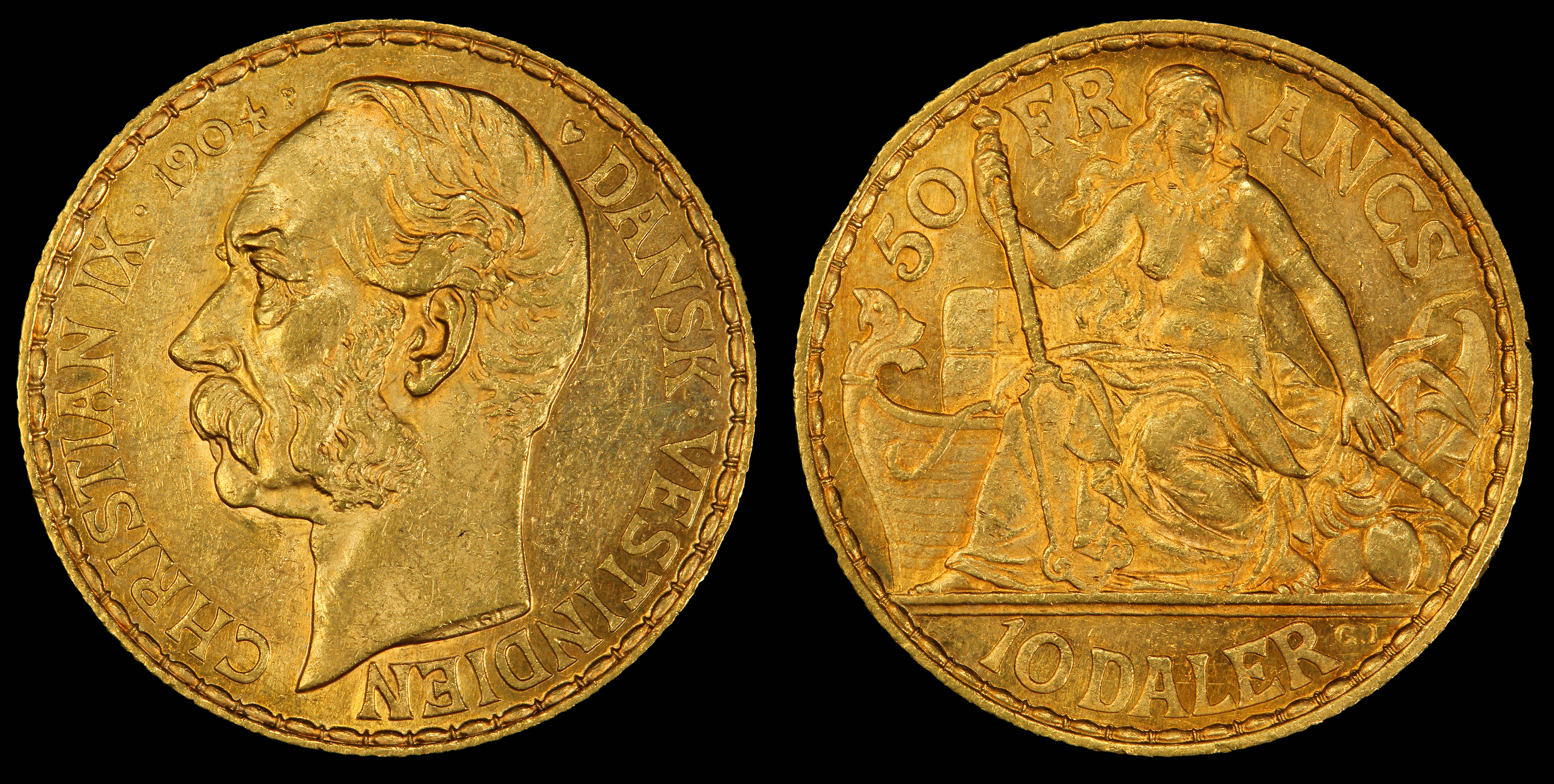
Christian IX, on a 10 Daler coin of the Danish West Indies (1904)

The great dynastic success of the six children was to a great extent not attributable to Christian himself but the result of the ambitions of his wife Louise of Hesse-Kassel. An additional factor was that Denmark was not one of the Great Powers, so the other powers did not fear that the balance of power in Europe would be upset by a marriage of one of its royalty to another royal house.

Christian's grandsons included Nicholas II of Russia, Constantine I of Greece, George V of the United Kingdom, Christian X of Denmark, and Haakon VII of Norway.

Today, members of most of Europe's reigning and ex-reigning royal families are direct descendants of Christian IX. Namely, six of the ten current hereditary European monarchs are descended from Christian: King Frederik X of Denmark, King Charles III of the United Kingdom, King Philippe of Belgium, King Haakon VIII of Norway, King Felipe VI of Spain, and Guillaume V, Grand Duke of Luxembourg.

== Titles, styles, honours, and arms ==
=== Titles and styles ===
During his reign, the King's full style was: His Majesty Christian IX, By the Grace of God, King of Denmark, of the Wends and of the Goths, Duke of Schleswig, Holstein, Stormarn, Dithmarschen, Lauenburg and Oldenburg. (Note: In spite of the fact that Denmark lost the duchies as a consequence of the Treaty of Vienna in 1864, this style continued to be used until the 1972 accession of Queen Margrethe II.)

=== Honours ===
King Christian IX Land in Greenland is named after him.

National orders and decorations

- Grand Cross of the Dannebrog, 28 June 1840; Grand Commander in Diamonds, 15 November 1863
- Knight of the Elephant, 22 June 1843
- Cross of Honour of the Order of the Dannebrog

Foreign orders and decorations

- Ascanian duchies: Grand Cross of the Order of Albert the Bear, 18 January 1854
- (Austrian Empire) (Kingdom of Hungary) Austria-Hungary: Grand Cross of the Royal Hungarian Order of St. Stephen, 1867
- Baden:
  - Knight of the House Order of Fidelity, 1877
  - Knight of the Order of Berthold the First, 1877
- Kingdom of Bavaria: Knight of St. Hubert, 1888
- Belgium: Grand Cordon of the Order of Leopold, 10 September 1862
- Empire of Brazil: Grand Cross of the Order of Pedro I
- (Saxe-Coburg and Gotha) (Duchy of Saxe-Altenburg) (Saxe-Meiningen) Ernestine duchies: Grand Cross of the Saxe-Ernestine House Order, October 1838
- France: Grand Cross of the Legion of Honour
- Greece: Grand Cross of the Redeemer
- Kingdom of Hawaii: Grand Cross of the Order of Kamehameha I
- Hesse-Darmstadt: Grand Cross of the Ludwig Order, 1 October 1863
- Hesse-Kassel: Grand Cross of the Golden Lion, 22 September 1842
- Kingdom of Italy: Knight of the Annunciation, 9 November 1864
- Empire of Japan: Grand Cordon of the Order of the Chrysanthemum, 24 September 1886
- Mecklenburg: Grand Cross of the Wendish Crown, with Crown in Ore, 6 February 1872
- Mexican Empire: Grand Cross of the Mexican Eagle, with Collar, 1865
- Principality of Monaco: Grand Cross of St. Charles, 7 February 1864
- Principality of Montenegro: Grand Cross of the Order of Prince Danilo I
- Nassau: Knight of the Gold Lion of Nassau, September 1859
- Netherlands: Grand Cross of the Netherlands Lion
- Ottoman Empire: Yüksek İmtiyaz Nişanı, in Diamonds, 1885
- Kingdom of Portugal:
  - Grand Cross of the Royal Military Order of Our Lord Jesus Christ
  - Grand Cross of the Tower and Sword
  - Grand Cross of Our Lady of Conception
- Prussia:
  - Knight of the Black Eagle, 8 December 1866
  - Grand Cross of the Red Eagle
- Romania: Grand Cross of the Star of Romania
- Russian Empire:
  - Knight of St. Andrew, 1842
  - Knight of St. Alexander Nevsky
  - Knight of the White Eagle
  - Knight of St. Anna, 1st Class
  - Knight of St. Stanislaus, 1st Class
- Saxe-Weimar-Eisenach: Grand Cross of the White Falcon, 1878
- Kingdom of Saxony: Knight of the Rue Crown, 1888
- Principality of Serbia: Grand Cross of the Cross of Takovo
- (Thailand) Siam: Grand Cross of the White Elephant
- Restoration (Spain): Knight of the Golden Fleece, 22 March 1864
- Sweden-Norway:
  - Knight of the Seraphim, with Collar, 8 June 1848
  - Grand Cross of St. Olav, 29 July 1869
  - Knight of the Norwegian Lion, 10 September 1904
- Tunisia: Husainid Family Order, in Diamonds
- United Kingdom of Great Britain and Ireland:
  - Honorary Grand Cross of the Bath (civil), 20 March 1863
  - Stranger Knight Companion of the Garter, 17 June 1865
  - Recipient of the Royal Victorian Chain, 8 April 1904
- Württemberg: Grand Cross of the Württemberg Crown, 1888

Honorary military appointments

- Honorary General of the Swedish Army, 1872 (Sweden-Norway)

=== Arms ===
As Sovereign, Christian IX used the greater (royal) coat of arms of Denmark. The arms were changed in 1903, as Iceland from then was represented by a falcon rather than its traditional stockfish arms.

Royal arms from 1863 to 1903

Royal arms from 1903 to 1906

== Family ==
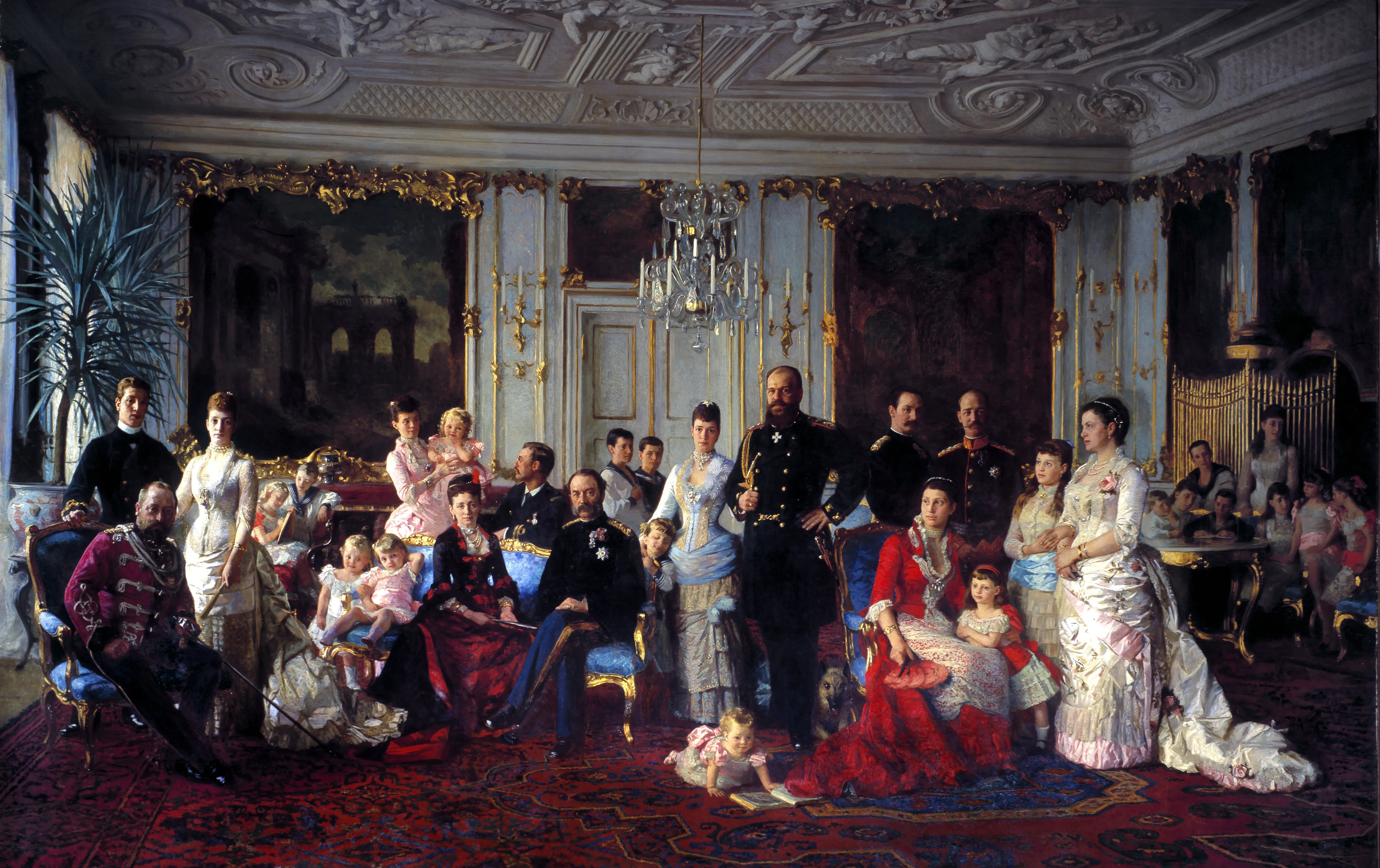
The Family of Christian IX of Denmark gathered in the Garden Hall of Fredensborg Palace in 1883. Painting by Laurits Tuxen (1883–86).

=== Issue ===
| Name | Birth | Death | Spouse | Children |
|---|---|---|---|---|
| Frederick VIII of Denmark | 3 June 1843 | 14 May 1912 (aged 68) | Princess Louise of Sweden (m. 1869) | Christian X of Denmark; Haakon VII of Norway; Louise, Princess Frederick of Schaumburg-Lippe; Prince Harald of Denmark; Princess Ingeborg, Duchess of Västergötland; Princess Thyra of Denmark; Prince Gustav of Denmark; Princess Dagmar, Mrs. Castenskiold |
| Princess Alexandra of Denmark | 1 December 1844 | 20 November 1925 (aged 80) | Edward VII of the United Kingdom (m. 1863) | Prince Albert Victor, Duke of Clarence and Avondale; George V of the United Kingdom; Louise, Princess Royal and Duchess of Fife; Princess Victoria of the United Kingdom; Maud, Queen of Norway; Prince Alexander John of Wales |
| George I of Greece | 24 December 1845 | 18 March 1913 (aged 67) | Grand Duchess Olga Constantinovna of Russia (m. 1867) | Constantine I of Greece; Prince George of Greece and Denmark; Grand Duchess Alexandra Georgievna of Russia; Prince Nicholas of Greece and Denmark; Grand Duchess Maria Georgievna of Russia; Princess Olga of Greece and Denmark; Prince Andrew of Greece and Denmark; Prince Christopher of Greece and Denmark |
| Princess Dagmar of Denmark | 26 November 1847 | 13 October 1928 (aged 80) | Alexander III of Russia (m. 1866) | Nicholas II of Russia; Grand Duke Alexander Alexandrovich of Russia; Grand Duke George Alexandrovich of Russia; Grand Duchess Xenia Alexandrovna of Russia; Grand Duke Michael Alexandrovich of Russia; Olga Alexandrovna, Duchess Peter Alexandrovich of Oldenburg |
| Princess Thyra of Denmark | 29 September 1853 | 26 February 1933 (aged 79) | Ernest Augustus, Crown Prince of Hanover and Duke of Cumberland and Teviotdale (m. 1878) | Marie Louise, Margravine of Baden; George William, Hereditary Prince of Hanover; Alexandra, Grand Duchess of Mecklenburg-Schwerin; Princess Olga of Hanover and Cumberland; Prince Christian of Hanover and Cumberland; Ernest Augustus, Prince of Hanover and Duke of Brunswick |
| Prince Valdemar of Denmark | 27 October 1858 | 14 January 1939 (aged 80) | Princess Marie of Orléans (m. 1885) | Prince Aage, Count of Rosenborg; Prince Axel of Denmark; Prince Erik, Count of Rosenborg; Prince Viggo, Count of Rosenborg; Margaret, Princess René of Bourbon-Parma |

== Notes ==
Christian IX House of Schleswig-Holstein-Sonderburg-Glücksburg Cadet branch of the House of Oldenburg Born: 8 April 1818 Died: 29 January 1906
Regnal titles
| Preceded by Frederick VII | King of Denmark; 1863–1906 | Succeeded by Frederick VIII |
| Preceded by Frederick VII | Duke of Schleswig and Holstein; 1863–1864 | Titles mediatised |
| Preceded by Frederick VII | Duke of Saxe-Lauenburg; 1863–1864 | Succeeded by Wilhelm I |
