= Edwyn Burnaby =

Edwyn Burnaby may refer to:

- Edwyn Burnaby (courtier) (1798–1867), English landowner, Justice of the Peace, Deputy Lieutenant, and High Sheriff of Leicestershire
- Edwyn Burnaby (politician) (1830–1883), his son, an English major general and Member of Parliament for Leicestershire North
