= Louisa Cavendish-Bentinck =

Great-grandmother of Queen Elizabeth II

- Born: Caroline Louisa Burnaby; Hungarton, Leicestershire, England
- Baptised: 5 December 1832
- Died: 6 July 1918 (aged 85); Dawlish, Devon, England
- Known for: Great-grandmother of Elizabeth II
- Spouses: Charles Cavendish-Bentinck (m. 1859; died 1865); Henry Warren Scott (m. 1870; died 1889)
- Children: Cecilia Bowes-Lyon; Ann Violet Cavendish-Bentinck; Hyacinth Jessup
- Parents: Edwyn Burnaby, of Baggrave Hall (father); Anne Caroline Salisbury (mother)

Caroline Louisa Cavendish-Bentinck (née Burnaby; 23 November 1832 – 6 July 1918) was the maternal grandmother of Queen Elizabeth the Queen Mother and a great-grandmother of Queen Elizabeth II.

== Early life ==
Caroline Louisa Burnaby was born at Baggrave Hall, near Hungarton, Leicestershire on 23 November 1832. She was a daughter of Edwyn Burnaby of Baggrave Hall and his wife, the former Anne Caroline Salisbury. She was baptised on 5 December 1832 at Hungarton, Leicestershire. She was a sister of Edwyn Burnaby, a first cousin of Frederick Gustavus Burnaby, and an aunt of Algernon Burnaby.

== Marriages and issue ==
Louisa Burnaby married the Rev. Charles Cavendish-Bentinck, as his second wife, on 13 December 1859. Rev. Cavendish-Bentinck was the elder son of Lieutenant Colonel Lord Charles Bentinck and Anne Wellesley, formerly Lady Abdy. His paternal grandparents were William Cavendish-Bentinck, 3rd Duke of Portland, Prime Minister of Great Britain, and Dorothy Cavendish, daughter of William Cavendish, 4th Duke of Devonshire. Together, Louisa and Charles were the parents of three daughters:

- Cecilia Nina Cavendish-Bentinck (11 September 1862 – 23 June 1938), who married Claude Bowes-Lyon, 14th Earl of Strathmore and Kinghorne. Her children included Queen Elizabeth the Queen Mother.
- Ann Violet Cavendish-Bentinck (9 December 1864 – 15 May 1932).
- Hyacinth Cavendish-Bentinck (9 December 1864 – 9 December 1916); who married an American, Augustus Edward Jessup, son of Alfred Dupont Jessup. Augustus was the widower of Lady Mildred Marion Bowes-Lyon.

After her first husband's death in 1865, she married Henry Warren Scott, the son of Sir William Scott, 6th Baronet, of Ancrum, on 30 September 1870. He died on 23 August 1889 at Forbes House, Ham, Surrey, and was buried in St Andrew's Church, Ham.

Louisa Scott died aged 85, twice widowed, on 6 July 1918 at Dawlish, Devon.

== Descendants ==
Through her eldest daughter Cecilia, the Countess of Strathmore and Kinghorne, she was a grandmother of Queen Elizabeth the Queen Mother and thus a great-grandmother of Queen Elizabeth II.

== Ancestors ==
Ancestors of Louisa Cavendish-Bentinck

8. Andrew Burnaby
4. Edwyn Burnaby (1771–1824)
9. Anne Edwyn
2. Edwyn Burnaby (1798–1867)
10. William Browne
5. Mary Browne
11. Mary Adcock
1. Caroline Louisa Burnaby
12. Thomas Salisbury (1730–1778)
6. Thomas Salisbury (1761–1810)
13. Mary Lister
3. Anne Caroline Salisbury
14. Francis Webb
7. Frances Webb
15. Mary Garritt
