= Anne Caroline Salisbury =

Great-grandmother of Queen Elizabeth The Queen Mother

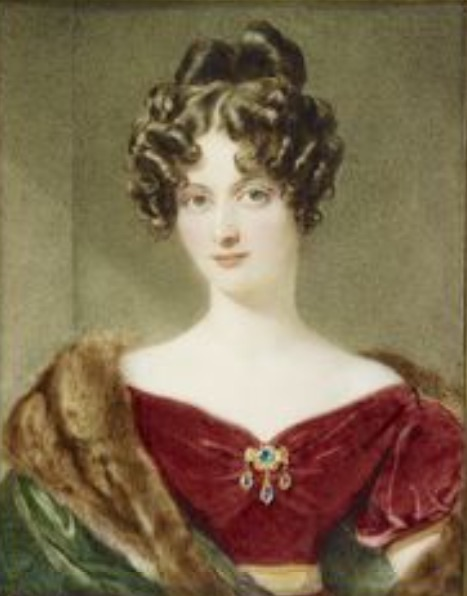
- Baptised: 15 December 1805; Fordington
- Died: 3 May 1881 (aged 75); Mayfair
- Spouse: Edwyn Burnaby (m. 1829; died 1867)
- Children: Edwyn Sherard Burnaby; Caroline Louisa Burnaby; Cecilia Newton; Gertrude Vaughan, Countess of Lisburne; Ida Charlotte Conolly
- Parents: Thomas Salisbury (father); Frances Webb (mother)

Anne Caroline Salisbury (15 December 1805 – 3 May 1881) was the wife of Edwyn Burnaby, and mother of Edwyn Sherard Burnaby and Caroline Louisa Burnaby. She is the direct maternal great-grandmother of Queen Elizabeth The Queen Mother, great-great-grandmother of Queen Elizabeth II, and great-great-great-grandmother of King Charles III.

Anne's father was Thomas Salisbury (1761, Marshfield House, Settle, West Riding of Yorkshire – 1810), a solicitor of Fordington, Dorset. His parents were Thomas Salisbury and Mary Lister. Anne's mother was Frances Webb, who was born to Mary Garritt and Francis Webb.

On 29 August 1829, she married Edwyn Burnaby, an English landowner, of Baggrave Hall, Leicestershire, a Justice of the Peace, Deputy Lieutenant, and High Sheriff of Leicestershire in 1864. He also succeeded his father in the Court post of Gentleman of the Privy chamber.

They had several children, including:

- Edwyn Sherard Burnaby (1830–1883); general and Member of Parliament
- Caroline Louisa Burnaby (1832–1918), married Charles Cavendish-Bentinck; matrilineal great-grandmother of Queen Elizabeth II; and great-great-grandmother of King Charles III.
- Cecilia Florence Burnaby (d. 1869); married as his second wife George Onslow Newton.
- Gertrude Laura Burnaby (d. 1865); married Ernest Vaughan, 5th Earl of Lisburne.
- Ida Charlotte Burnaby (1839–1886); married John Augustus Conolly.

She was recorded as living at her house at 50 Eaton Place, London, just a month before her death on 3 May 1881.
