= Frederick Burnaby =

British traveller and soldier (1842–1885)

Frederick Gustavus Burnaby
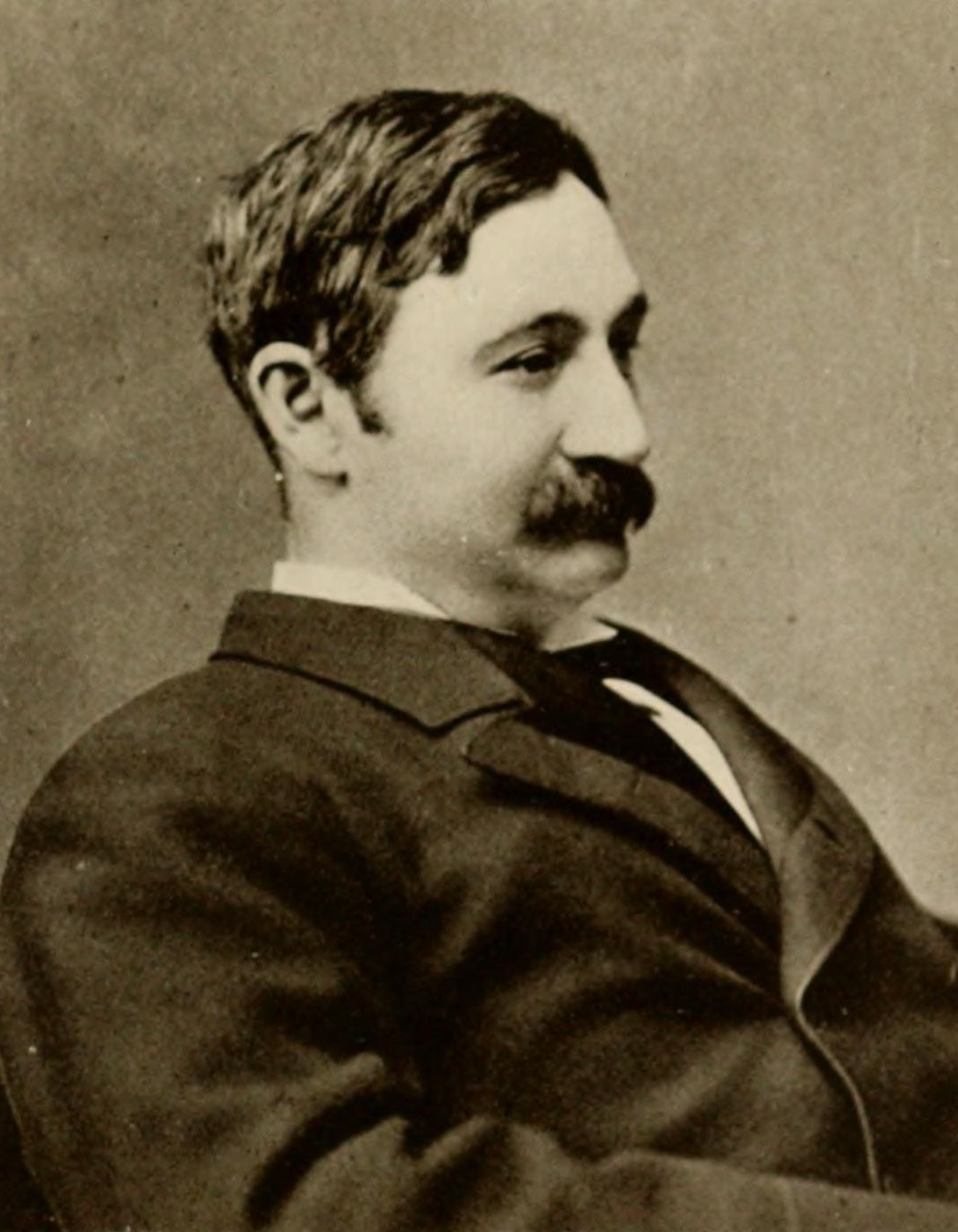
- Born: 3 March 1842; St Peter's Green, Bedford, England
- Died: 17 January 1885 (aged 42); Abu Klea, Sudan
- Spouse: Elizabeth Hawkins-Whitshed (m. 1879)
- Children: 1
- Military career
- Allegiance: United Kingdom
- Branch: British Army
- Service years: 1859–1885
- Rank: Colonel
- Conflicts: Mahdist War: First and Second Battles of El Teb; Battle of Abu Klea

Colonel Frederick Gustavus Burnaby (3 March 1842 – 17 January 1885) was a British Army intelligence officer. Burnaby's adventurous spirit, pioneering achievements, and swashbuckling courage earned an affection in the minds of Victorian imperial idealists. As well as travelling across Europe and Central Asia, he mastered ballooning, spoke a number of foreign languages fluently, stood for parliament twice, published several books, and was admired and feted by the women of London high society. His popularity was legendary, appearing in a number of stories and tales of empire and having a song dedicated to him after death.

== Early life ==
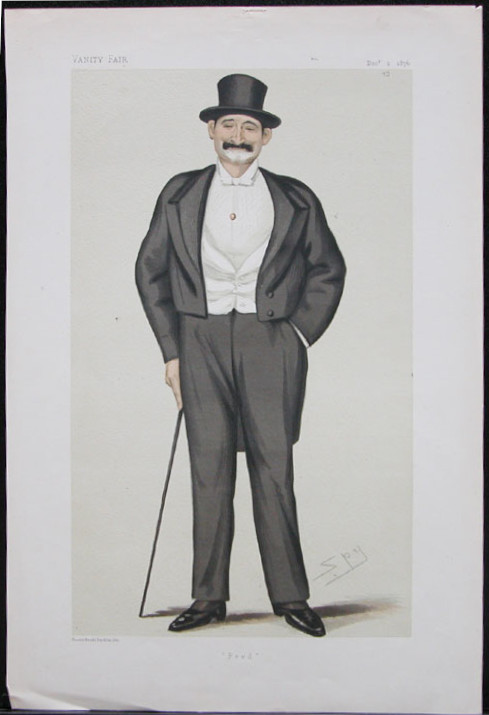
Vanity Fair caricature, 2 December 1876

Burnaby was born on 3 March 1842 in St Peter's Green, Bedford to The Revd Gustavus Andrew Burnaby (1802–1872) of Somerby Hall, Leicestershire, and Harriet Burnaby (née Villebois; 1804–1883). His father was the rector of St Peter's Church, Bedford, and chaplain to the Duke of Cambridge. The maternal nephew of the politician and racehorse owner Henry Villebois (1807–1883), Burnaby was also the cousin of Edwyn Burnaby and Louisa Cavendish-Bentinck. The third of at least four siblings; Burnaby's elder sister Mary married John Manners-Sutton.

Initially educated at Bedford Grammar School, Burnaby attended Revd Charles Arnold's school at Tinwell, Rutland, from 1852 to 1855. Burnaby subsequently spent two years at Harrow before attending the Oswestry School for a further two years. Burnaby also studied languages in Dresden.

Burnaby was a tall man for his times: 6 ft 4in tall and 20 stone when fully grown.. Praised by the press for his travels across Central Asia, Burnaby became symbolic of a Victorian celebrity, feted in London society. Passing the army examination in 1858, Burnaby purchased the rank of Cornet in the Royal Horse Guards on 30 September 1859. Finding no chance for active service, he sought outlets in balloon ascents and in travels through Spain and Russia with his friend, George Radford. In the summer of 1874 he accompanied the Carlist forces in Spain as correspondent for The Times, but before the end of the war he was transferred to Africa to report on Gordon's expedition to the Sudan. This took Burnaby as far as Khartoum.

== Military adventures ==
Returning to England in March 1875, he formulated his plans for a journey on horseback to the Khanate of Khiva through Russian Asia, which had just been closed to travellers. War had broken out between the Russian army and the Turcoman tribesmen of the desert. He planned to visit St. Petersburg to meet Count Milyutin, the Minister of War to the Tsar. Travelling at his own expense carrying an 85 lb pack, he departed London Victoria station on 30 November 1875. The Russians announced they would protect the soldier along the route, but to all intents and purposes this proved impossible. The accomplishment of this task, in the winter of 1875–1876, with the aim of reciprocity for India and the Tsarist State, was described in his book A Ride to Khiva, and brought him immediate fame. The city of Merv was inaccessible, but presented a potential military flashpoint. The Russians knew that British Intelligence gathered information along the frontier. Similar expeditions had taken place under Captain George Napier (1874) and Colonel Charles MacGregor (1875). By Christmas, Burnaby had arrived at Orenburg. In receipt of orders prohibiting progress into Persia from Russian-held territory, he was warned not to advance. A fluent Russian speaker, he was not coerced; arriving at a Russian garrison, the officers entertaining the former Khan of Kokand.

Hiring a servant and horses his party trudged through the snow to Kazala, intending a crossing into Afghanistan from Merv. Extreme winter blizzards brought frostbite, treated with "naphtha", a Cossack emetic. Close to death, Burnaby took three weeks to recover. Having received conflicted accounts of the dubious privilege of Russian hospitality it was a welcome release, he later told his book, to be cheered with vodka. It was another 400 miles south to Khiva, when he was requested to divert to Petro-Alexandrovsk, a Russian fortress garrison. Lurid tales of wild tribesmen awaiting his desert travails ready to "gouge out his eyes" were intended to discourage. He ignored the escort, believing the tribes more friendly than the Russians. Intending to go via Bokhara and Merv, he deviated, cutting two days off the journey. Leaving Kazala on 12 January 1876 with a servant, guide, three camels and a kibitka, (Note: a Turcoman tent.) Burnaby bribed the servant with 100 Roubles a day to avoid the fortress where he would be bound to be delayed. A local mullah wrote an introduction note to the Khan, and clad in furs they traversed the freezing desert. On the banks of River, 60 miles from the capital, he was met by the Khan's nobleman, who guided the escort into the city. Burnaby's book outlined in some detail the events of the following days, the successful outcome of the meetings, and the decision he took to evade the Russian army. The Khanate was already at war, his possessions seized; the Russians intended a march from Tashkent to seize Kashgar, Merv and Herat. Protestations of neutrality were a sham. Burnaby gained respect from the population, who bowed in homage at a soldier en passant. But on return to his quarters he received a note of orders from Horse Guards to return via Russia. Frustrated Burnaby learnt of the overwhelming numerical superiority the Tsarists presented. To his great surprise he was received as a brother officer at Petro-Alexandrovsk. Colonel Ivanov was smug and proud declared the fate of Merv "must be decided by the sword." Released by the Khan's Treasurer he travelled for nine days with Cossacks across the snowy plains of Kazala. Hard-bitten and hungry he sat on a small pony for 900 miles. En route he heard of what later was described in parliament as the Bulgarian Horrors, and a forthcoming campaign against Yakub Beg in Kashgaria.

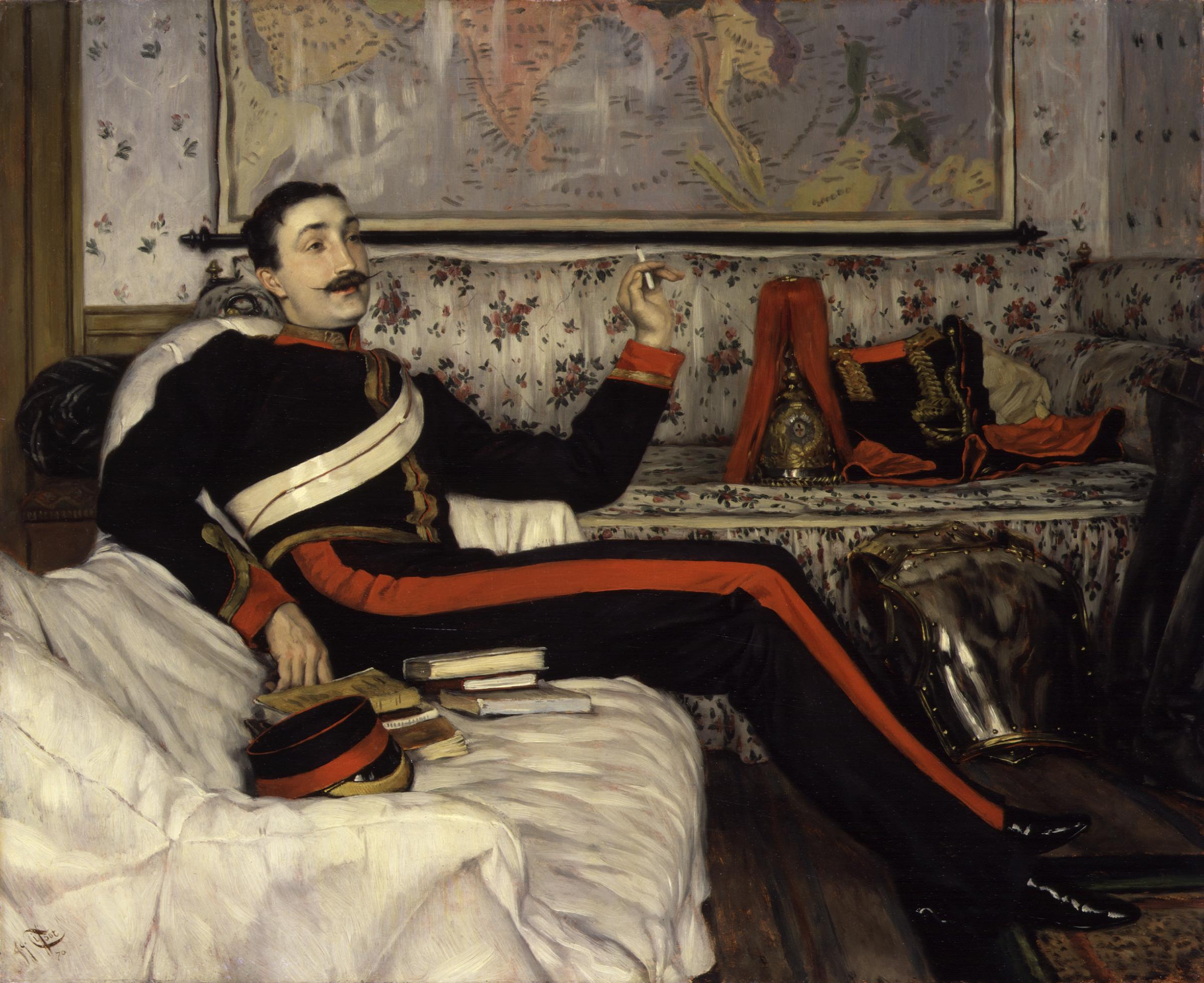
Portrait of Frederick Burnaby in his uniform as a captain in the Royal Horse Guards by James Tissot (1870)

On arrival back in England, March 1876, he was received by Commander-in-Chief, Prince George, Duke of Cambridge, whose praise marvelled at Burnaby's feats of derring-do and impressive physique. Burnaby's fame grew celebrated in London society, in newspaper and magazines. His guest appearances proved disappointing, when he learnt that he had travelled with the ringleaders of the Cossack Revolt. The rising of the Eastern Question in parliament was sparked in a village in Hercegovina and spread to Bosnia, Serbia, Montenegro and Bulgaria. Outraged by the pogroms the Prime Minister ordered immediate diplomatic efforts, while W. E. Gladstone demanded an aggressive clear out of the Sultanate from Europe. In the midst of this crisis Burnaby planned a second expedition, obtaining a letter of recommendation in Turkish and a diplomatic passport from the Ottoman ambassador in London, Konstantinos Mousouros, to whom he stressed his anti-Russian sentiments. At Constantinople he had planned to meet Count Ignatiev, the Russian ambassador, whom he missed on his journey across Turkey on horseback, through Asia Minor, from Scutari to Erzerum, with the object of observing the Russian frontier, an account of which he afterwards published. He was warned the Russian garrison had issued an arrest warrant; turning back at the frontier he took ship on the Black Sea via the Bosphorus and the Mediterranean. In April 1877 Russia declared war on Turkey. The inexorable conclusion was drawn in Calcutta and London that Russia would not avoid, but wanted war and was planning more attacks. Eager for Russian rule, Colonel N L Grodekov had built a road from Tashkent to Herat via Samarkand, anticipating a war of conquest. Burnaby's warnings that the bellicose Russians posed a serious threat to India were later confirmed by Lord Curzon, and an expedition much later under the Arabist Colonel Francis Younghusband, witnessed by the genesis of a Cossack invasion.

Burnaby, who soon afterwards became lieutenant-colonel, acted as travelling agent to the Stafford House Red Cross Committee, but had to return to England before the campaign was over. Taking an active interest in politics, in 1880 he unsuccessfully contested Birmingham in the Tory-Democrat interest, which was followed by a second attempt in 1885.

On 23 March 1882 he crossed the English Channel in a gas balloon. Having been disappointed in his hope of seeing active service in the Egyptian Campaign of 1882, he participated in the Suakin campaign of 1884 without official leave, and he was wounded at El Teb while acting as an intelligence officer for his friend General Valentine Baker.

=== Death ===
When the Gordon Relief Expedition started up the Nile, he was given a post by Lord Wolseley. Burnaby was in the 'Desert Column' which was sent on camels on a 380 km shortcut across the desert to reach the steamers that would take them to relieve the Siege of Khartoum. He was involved in the skirmish at El Teb, but was killed in the hand-to-hand fighting of the Battle of Abu Klea. As a gap in the lines opened up Burnaby rushed out to rescue a colleague and was wounded outside the square. Corporal Mackintosh went to his rescue driving his bayonet into the assailant. Lieutenant-Colonel Lord Binning rushed out to give him some water twice. On the last occasion he came across a private crying, holding the dying man's head. He had been struck again by a Mahdist spear through the neck and throat. Lord Binning recalled "that in our little force his death caused a feeling akin to consternation. In my own detachment many of the men sat down and cried". Private Steele who went to help him won the Distinguished Conduct Medal. There are two memorials erected to his memory in Holy Trinity Garrison and Parish Church in Windsor, the first by the officers and men of the Royal Horse Guards and the second a privately funded memorial from Edward, Prince of Wales.

== Family ==
During the 1878 season, Burnaby became engaged to the 18 year old Irish debut Elizabeth Hawkins-Whitshed, the heiress of the Killincarrick estate in Greystones, County Wicklow and future mountaineer, author and photographer. On 25 June 1879, Burnaby and Hawkins-Whitshed married at St Peter's Church, London. Through a marriage settlement, Burnaby earned a annual income of £1000 from Hawkins-Whitshed's estate and lands in Ireland. The Killincarrick estate was subsequently known as the Burnaby estate.

The couple's son was born in 1880. From 1881, Hawkins-Whitshed lived abroad due to her health and the couple only spent about one year together during their marriage.

== Cultural references ==
Henry Newbolt's poem "Vitaï Lampada" is often quoted as referring to Burnaby's death at Abu Klea; "The Gatling's jammed and the Colonel's dead...", (although it was a Gardner machine gun which jammed). It was, perhaps, because of an impromptu order by Burnaby (who, as a supernumerary, had no official capacity in the battle) that the Dervishes managed to get inside the square. Yet the song "Colonel Burnaby" was written in his honour and his portrait hangs in the National Portrait Gallery, London. There are two contradictory accounts:

1. The report in The Times, says that Burnaby fell while re-forming a broken British square, this being one of only two recorded cases of a British square breaking in the 19th century.
2. Another account says that the square did not break, but men were ordered to pull aside temporarily to let the Gardner gun and then the Heavy Camel Corps get out and attack the enemy. Some Dervishes got inside before the gap closed, but the back ranks of the square faced-about and made an end of the intruders.

Burnaby's Ride to Khiva appears in Joseph Conrad's 1898 short story, "Youth", when the young Marlow recounts how he "read for the first time Sartor Resartus and Burnaby's Ride to Khiva," preferring "the soldier to the philosopher at the time."

Burnaby appears as a balloonist in Julian Barnes's memoir Levels of Life (2014), where he is portrayed as having a (fictional) love affair with Sarah Bernhardt.

It has been suggested that Burnaby may have been (in part) an inspiration for the creation of George MacDonald Fraser's fictional anti-hero Harry Flashman.

== Works ==
- Practical Instruction of Staff Officers in Foreign Armies (1872)
- A Ride to Khiva: Travels and Adventures in Central Asia (1876) ISBN 1590480198
- On Horseback Through Asia Minor (1877) ISBN 1590480317

(both with an introduction by Peter Hopkirk)

- A Ride across the Channel (1882)
- Our Radicals: A Tale of Love and Politics (1886)

Journals

- Regular contributions as roving correspondent to The Times in Egypt and the Sudan
- Vanity Fair
- Punch from 1872 onwards.

Letters

- (ed. Dr. John W. Hawkins) Fred: The Collected Letters and Speeches of Colonel Frederick Gustavus Burnaby. Vol. 1 1842-1878 (Helion & Co., 2013) ISBN 978-1-90938-451-4
- (ed. Dr. John W. Hawkins) Fred: The Collected Letters and Speeches of Colonel Frederick Gustavus Burnaby. Vol. 2 1878-1885 (Helion & Co., 2014) ISBN 978-1-90998-213-0

== Legacy ==
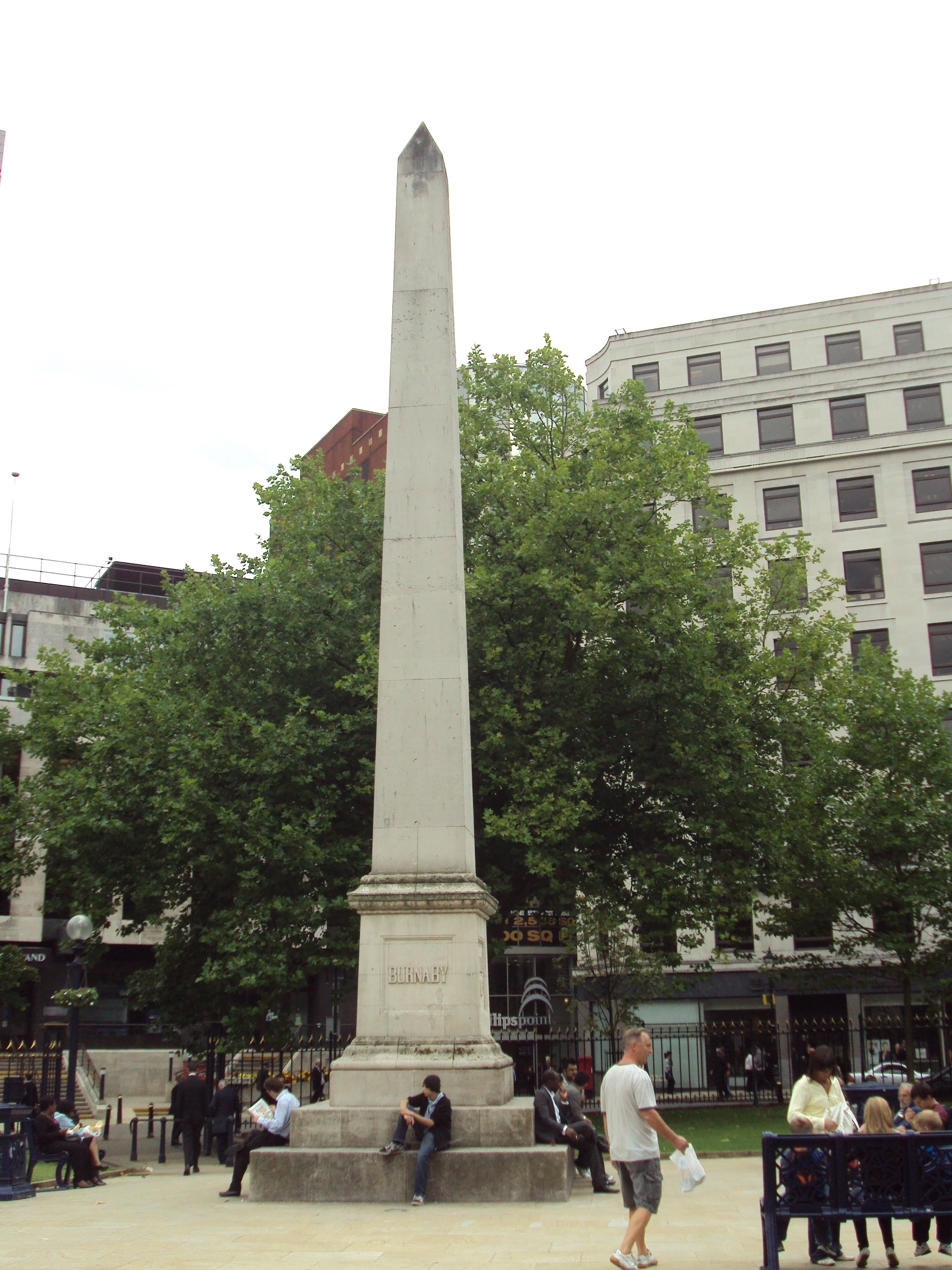
Memorial obelisk in churchyard of St Philip's Cathedral, Birmingham

A tall Portland stone obelisk in the churchyard of St Philip's Cathedral, Birmingham commemorates his life. Besides Burnaby's bust, in relief, it carries only the word "Burnaby", and the dated place names "Khiva 1875" and "Abu Klea 1885". The obelisk was unveiled by Lord Charles Beresford on 13 November 1885.

There is a memorial window to Burnaby at St Peter's Church, Bedford. There is also a public house, The Burnaby Arms, located in the Black Tom area of Bedford. The organ at Oswestry School Chapel was given in his memory.

William Kinnard, who was instrumental in acquiring a post office for a tiny settlement at the base of Morgan's Point on Lake Erie's North Shore in Ontario, Canada, "suggested the name Burnaby" for the settlement after an article he had read in The Globe newspaper about a Colonel who had been killed in the Egyptian War.

== Notes ==
=== Bibliography ===
- Alexander, Michael (1957). The True Blue: The Life and Adventures of Colonel Fred Burnaby 1842-85. London: Rupert Hart-Davis.
- Corning, Charles P. The Life of Colonel Fred Burnaby. UCLA.
- Hamilton, John Andrew (1886). "Burnaby, Frederick Gustavus" . In Stephen, Leslie (ed.). Dictionary of National Biography. Vol. 7. London: Smith, Elder & Co. pp. 380–382.
- Mann, R.K. (1882). The Life, Adventures and Political Opinions of Frederick Gustavus Burnaby.
- Ware, J. Redding; Mann, R.K. (1885). The Life and Times of Colonel Fred Burnaby.
- Wright, Thomas (1908). The Life of Colonel Fred Burnaby. Everett & Co.

=== Further reading ===
- (Andrew, Sir William ?) "An Indian Officer", Russia's March towards India, 1894
- Baker, Valentine (1876). Clouds in the East: Travels and Adventures on the Perso-Turkoman Frontier. London: Chatto and Windus.
- Baker, Valentine (1879). War in Bulgaria: A Narrative of Personal Experiences. London: Sampson Low, Marston, Searle & Rivington.
- Frechtling, L.E. (1939). "Anglo-Russian Rivalry in Eastern Turkistan, 1863-1881". Journal of the Royal Central Asian Society. XXVI. London.
- Hopkirk, Peter (1990). The Great Game: On Secret Service in High Asia. London: John Murray. ISBN 0-7195-4727X.
- Marvin, Charles (1880). Colonel Grodekoff's Ride from Samarkand to Herat.
- Morgan, Gerald (1981). Anglo-Russian Rivalry in Central Asia 1810-1895.
- Robson, B. (1886). The Road to Kabul: The Second Afghan War 1878-1881.
- Ure, John (2009). Shooting Leave: Spying Out Central Asia in the Great Game. London: Constable. ISBN 978-1-84901-040-5. Chapter 10 – "Fred Burnaby: The Gentle Giant"
