= Andrew Burnaby =

English travel writer and cleric

- Born: 16 August 1732; Asfordby, Leicestershire, England
- Died: 9 March 1812 (aged 79); Blackheath, Kent, England
- Occupations: Clergyman, travel writer
- Spouse: Anne Edwyn (m. 1770–1812)

Andrew Burnaby (16 August 1732 – 9 March 1812) was an English clergyman and travel writer, mainly about the American colonies and Italy.

== Life ==
He was born in Asfordby, Leicestershire, on 16 August 1732, the eldest son and namesake of the Reverend Andrew Burnaby, a well-to-do clergyman of the Church of England. The young Burnaby attended Westminster School, and then Queens' College, Cambridge, where he received his Bachelor of Arts degree in 1754 and his master's degree in 1757. After taking his BA he was ordained.

Shortly afterward he toured America, a trip which he later wrote up as a celebrated travelogue, Travels Through the Middle Settlements in North America, In the Years 1759 and 1760, which was published in 1775, and again in an enlarged form in 1798. He wrote about all of the things he saw in the colonies. His book avoids taking sides in the growing political struggles between the colonies and Britain, but he describes the discord among the states, the tensions between the colonists and the Indian tribes, and adverse "climate" in the south that "renders them indolent, inactive, and unenterprising... in every line of their character" as evidence that would prevent America from ever becoming a major power.

After his return to Europe, he became Chaplain to the British mission at Leghorn in 1762. He was posted there for about five years, rising to become Proconsul (but actually doing the job of Consul), until his eventual resignation and return to England, where he was appointed vicar at Greenwich, Kent, from 1769. He wrote an account of his travels in Corsica and Italy in 1804, but this ran to only a few copies.

Burnaby was made Doctor of Divinity and Professor of Sacred Theology at the University of Cambridge in 1776.

He married Anne Edwyn, daughter and heiress of John Edwyn of Baggrave Hall, Leicestershire, on 26 February 1770 at St George's, Hanover Square, London. This renewed his Leicestershire connection and he was made Archdeacon of Leicester in 1786. Their grandson, Edwyn Burnaby, was the maternal great-grandfather of Queen Elizabeth the Queen Mother and, therefore, the great-great-great-grandfather of King Charles III.

Burnaby died on 9 March 1812 at Blackheath, Kent, and was buried at Hungarton, Leicestershire. Anne Edwyn was baptised on 15 October 1735 at Hungarton, Leicestershire, and died there a few days after her husband, on 16 or 19 March 1812.
