= Edwyn Burnaby (British Army officer, born 1830) =

British Army general

Major-General Edwyn Burnaby MP
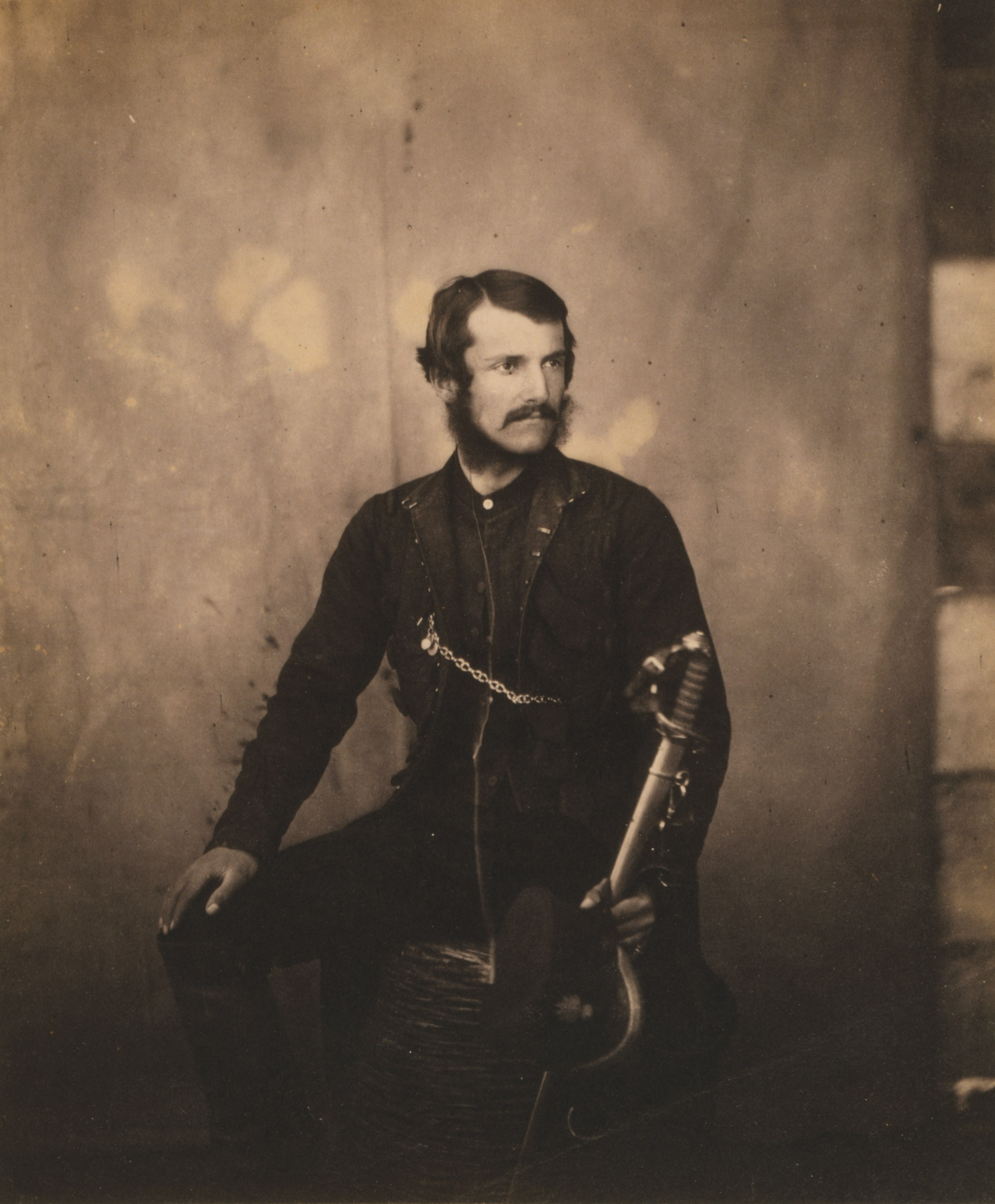
- Photograph by Roger Fenton, 1855
- Born: Edwyn Sherard Burnaby; 22 May 1830
- Died: 31 May 1883 (aged 53); Brighton, Sussex, England
- Military career
- Allegiance: United Kingdom
- Branch: British Army
- Unit: Grenadier Guards
- Conflicts: Crimean War
- Education: Eton College
- Political party: Conservative
- Spouse: Louisa Julia Mary Dixie (m. 1864)
- Parents: Edwyn Burnaby (father); Anne Caroline Salisbury (mother)

Edwyn Sherard Burnaby (22 May 1830 – 31 May 1883) was a British Army major-general and Conservative Party Member of Parliament (MP) for Leicestershire North from 1880 until his death. He served in the Crimean War.

== Biography ==
The son of Edwyn Burnaby and Anne Caroline Salisbury, Burnaby was educated at Eton College and in 1848 entered the Grenadier Guards, serving at Inkerman and in the Siege of Sebastopol. He was the brigadier-general of the British Italian Legion from 1855 to 1857.

Burnaby was appointed Honorary Colonel of the 1st Leicestershire Rifle Volunteer Corps in 1878.

He inherited Baggrave Hall, Leicestershire on the death of his father in 1867. In 1880 he was elected Conservative Member of Parliament for North Leicestershire together with Lord John Manners.

He married Louisa Julia Mary Dixie (1843-1881) on 29 August 1864 at St George's, Hanover Square. She was the daughter of Sir Willoughby Wolstan Dixie, 8th Baronet, of Market Bosworth. They had two children: Algernon Edwyn Burnaby (1867–1938), who married Hon. Sybil Cholmondeley (1871–1911), daughter of Hugh Cholmondeley, 2nd Baron Delamere, and Hilda Burnaby. He was a first cousin of Frederick Gustavus Burnaby and a great-uncle of Queen Elizabeth The Queen Mother through his sister Louisa Cavendish-Bentinck.

He died on 31 May 1883 in Brighton aged 53.

Parliament of the United Kingdom
Preceded by Lord John Manners; Samuel Clowes	Member of Parliament for Leicestershire North; 1880–1883; With: Lord John Manners	Succeeded by Lord John Manners; Hon. Montagu Curzon
