= Charles Cavendish-Bentinck =

Great-grandfather of Queen Elizabeth II of the UK (1817–1865)

The Reverend Charles Cavendish-Bentinck
- Born: 8 November 1817; Kensington, London, England
- Died: 17 August 1865 (aged 47); Ridgmount, Bedfordshire, England
- Known for: Great-grandfather of Elizabeth II
- Spouses: Sinetta Lambourne (m. 1839; died 1850); Louisa Burnaby (m. 1859)
- Children: Charles William Cavendish-Bentinck; Charles Cavendish-Bentinck; Cecilia Bowes-Lyon, Countess of Strathmore and Kinghorne; Ann Violet Cavendish-Bentinck; Hyacinth Jessop
- Parents: Lord Charles Cavendish-Bentinck (father); Anne Wellesley (mother)
- Family: Bentinck

Charles William Frederick Cavendish-Bentinck (8 November 1817 – 17 August 1865) was a priest of the Church of England who held livings in Bedfordshire. He was also the maternal grandfather of Queen Elizabeth the Queen Mother and a great-grandfather of Queen Elizabeth II.

Bentinck often gave his names as William Charles Cavendish Bentinck, resulting in his "W. C. C. Bentinck" signature. He rarely used the Cavendish-Bentinck surname.

== Life and career ==
Born at Kensington, Bentinck was the elder son of Lieutenant Colonel Lord Charles Bentinck and of Anne Wellesley, formerly Lady Abdy. He had a younger brother, Arthur Cavendish Bentinck, and two sisters, Anne and Emily. He was frequently addressed as William or William-Charles to distinguish him from his father. Later in life, he presented his name as William Charles Cavendish Bentinck, resulting in his "W. C. C. Bentinck" signature. He rarely used the double-barreled Cavendish-Bentinck surname.

Bentinck's paternal grandparents were William Cavendish-Bentinck, 3rd Duke of Portland, prime minister of Great Britain, and Dorothy Cavendish, a daughter of William Cavendish, 4th Duke of Devonshire, another prime minister, by his marriage to Lady Charlotte Boyle, a daughter of Richard Boyle, 3rd Earl of Burlington. Bentinck's maternal grandparents were Richard Wellesley, 1st Marquess Wellesley, and his wife Hyacinthe-Gabrielle Roland, a former actress at the Palais Royal. Wellesley, a Governor-General of India, was an older brother of Arthur Wellesley, 1st Duke of Wellington, another prime minister.

At birth, there seemed only a remote chance of either Bentinck or his brother Arthur succeeding to the family's peerages, as their father's eldest brother, the 4th Duke of Portland, already had several sons, and their father had another older brother, Lord William Bentinck (1774–1839). Bentinck was educated at Merton College, Oxford, where his paternal grandfather the 3rd Duke had been Chancellor, matriculating on 1 June 1837, and later at New Inn Hall, Oxford, while his brother decided to follow a military career. Bentinck eventually took the degree of BA in 1845, promoted by seniority to MA (Oxon) in 1846.

After taking his degree, Bentinck confirmed his plan of becoming a Church of England clergyman and was appointed as Vicar of Husborne Crawley, Bedfordshire, a benefice in the gift of Francis Russell, 7th Duke of Bedford. On 23 November 1849, the Duke also appointed him as vicar of Ridgmont, Bedfordshire. In both parishes, he was known as William Charles Cavendish Bentinck.

The likelihood of Bentinck becoming Duke of Portland increased when his uncle William Bentinck, 4th Duke of Portland died on 27 March 1854, with all four of his sons then dead or unmarried. The eldest, William, Marquess of Titchfield, had died in 1824, and Lord George in 1848. The eccentric Lord William (who succeeded his father as the 5th Duke of Portland) and the youngest son, Lord Henry, both remained unmarried. Bentinck himself was the next heir after Lord Henry, but he was also childless at the time: his wife Sinetta had died at Ampthill on 19 February 1850, of mesentery, leaving Bentinck a widower with no surviving children.

Bentinck died on 17 August 1865, aged 47, at Ridgmont, and was buried at Croxton, Cambridgeshire. His cousin Lord Henry William died in 1870, and the 5th Duke followed on 6 December 1879. Thus, the next Duke was Bentinck's nephew William Cavendish-Bentinck, a son of his younger brother Lt.-General Arthur Cavendish Bentinck, who had died in 1877.

== Marriages ==
On 26 September 1839, at St George's, Hanover Square, while still an Oxford undergraduate, Bentinck married his first wife, Sinetta Lambourne, daughter of James Lambourne, a horse dealer with some claim to be the founder of Summertown, Oxford, where he lived with his wife Sinetta Smith, a gypsy. Bentinck stated his address as Brook Street, while Sinetta gave hers as Southwick Street, Paddington. They soon had two sons, but both died in infancy:

- Charles William Cavendish Bentinck, born 1840, who died at 19 days old.
- Charles Cavendish Bentinck, born 1841, died 1842.

The cause of death for both children was "convulsions", and both were buried at All Souls, Kensal Green Cemetery.

Sinetta died at Ampthill on 19 February 1850.

On 13 December 1859, Bentinck married for a second time. His bride was Caroline Louisa Burnaby, a daughter of Edwyn Burnaby, a scion of the landed gentry, and of Anne Caroline Salisbury. They had three daughters:

- Cecilia Bowes-Lyon, Countess of Strathmore and Kinghorne (1862–1938)
- Ann Violet Cavendish-Bentinck (1864 – 5 May 1932)
- Hyacinth Sinetta Cavendish-Bentinck (1864 – 9 December 1916), who married Augustus Edward Jessop

In 1881, Bentinck's daughter Cecilia Nina married Claude Bowes-Lyon, 14th Earl of Strathmore and Kinghorne, and was the mother of Elizabeth Bowes-Lyon (1900–2002) and the grandmother of Queen Elizabeth II (1926–2022).

== Ancestors ==
Ancestors of Charles Cavendish-Bentinck

8. William Bentinck, 2nd Duke of Portland
4. William Cavendish-Bentinck, 3rd Duke of Portland
9. Lady Margaret Harley
2. Lord Charles Bentinck
10. William Cavendish, 4th Duke of Devonshire
5. Lady Dorothy Cavendish
11. Charlotte Boyle, 6th Baroness Clifford
1. Charles Cavendish-Bentinck
12. Garret Wesley, 1st Earl of Mornington
6. Richard Wellesley, 1st Marquess Wellesley
13. Anne Hill-Trevor
3. Anne Wellesley
14. Pierre Roland
7. Hyacinthe-Gabrielle Roland
15. Hyacinthe-Gabrielle Varis
