= Baggrave Hall =

18th-century country house in Leicestershire

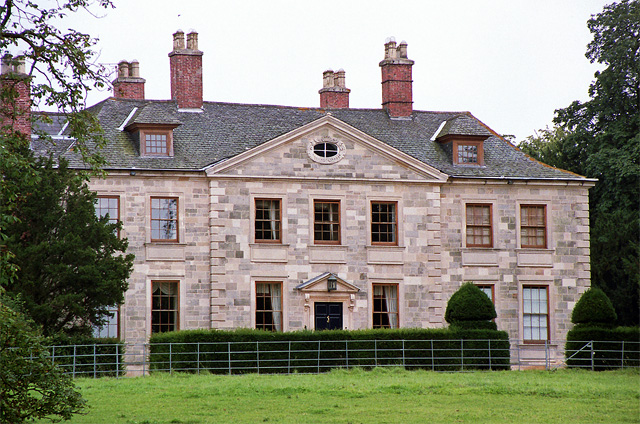

- Location within Leicestershire
- 52°40′27.84″N 0°58′5.52″W
- OS grid reference: SK6986109024

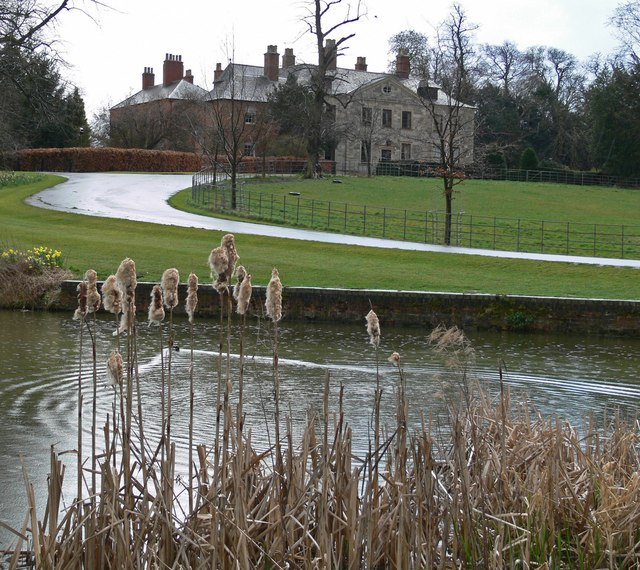
Baggrave Hall

Baggrave Hall is an 18th-century Grade II* listed country house in the parish of Hungarton, Leicestershire, England. It is a two and three-storey building in Palladian style, constructed in ashlar in the 1750s, with a Swithland slate hipped roof and brick-ridge chimney stacks. An extra wing in red brick can be dated to 1776. The current grounds cover 220 acres (89 ha). The hall was listed in 1951, but suffered serious damage from an owner in 1988–1990.

== History ==
Before the Dissolution of the Monasteries, the site belonged to Leicester Abbey. It was then sold by the Crown to Francis Cave, whose grandson, Sir Alexander Cave, sold it on before 1625 to Edward Villiers, half-brother of the Duke of Buckingham.

The hall belonged in the later 17th century to John Edwyn, whose grandson, also John, rebuilt it, but incorporated some parts of the 16th-century manor house. In 1770, his daughter Anna Edwyn married Andrew Burnaby, archdeacon of Leicester, and so ownership of the estate passed to the Burnaby family. Later owners included Edwyn Burnaby, high sheriff of Leicestershire, his son Edwyn Burnaby, and his grandson Algernon Edwyn Burnaby. Baggrave Hall was the childhood home of Louisa Burnaby, a great-grandmother of Queen Elizabeth II. Soon after Algernon Burnaby's death in 1938, his son and heir Hugh Edwyn Burnaby sold the estate. It became the home of the Earle family, which sold it about 1975.

The fabric of the building was severely damaged in 1988–1990 whilst in the ownership of an overseas company controlled by Asil Nadir, who had bought the estate for £3 million. Stonework was removed, walls were undermined, and interior walls, floors and ceilings ruined. The current owner has undertaken to rectify the damage as far as possible. The exterior of the house can be viewed close at hand from a public footpath that runs between South Croxton and Lowesby.

== Legend ==
According to legend, the hall was named after an incident involving a maidservant. She is said to have let a beggar woman take refuge at the hall, but later noticed by the boots that this was a man in disguise. Fearing he was a robber, she murdered him and wrapped his body in a potato bag, in which he was buried.
