= Edwyn Burnaby (courtier) =

English landowner (1798–1867)

Captain Edwyn Burnaby JP DL

High Sheriff of Leicestershire
- In office 1864–1864
- Preceded by: John Martin
- Succeeded by: Frederick Palmer

Personal details
- Born: 29 September 1798
- Died: 18 July 1867 (aged 68)
- Spouse: Anne Caroline Salisbury (m. 1829)
- Relations: Andrew Burnaby (grandfather)
- Children: Edwyn Burnaby; Louisa Cavendish-Bentinck; Cecilia Newton; Gertrude Vaughan, Countess of Lisburne; Ida Charlotte Conolly
- Parent(s): Edwyn Andrew Burnaby; Mary Browne
- Education: Worcester College, Oxford; Christ Church, Oxford

Captain Edwyn Burnaby JP DL (29 September 1798 – 18 July 1867) of Baggrave Hall, Leicestershire, was an English landowner, courtier, He was a maternal great-grandfather of Queen Elizabeth The Queen Mother and therefore a direct ancestor of Queen Elizabeth II and King Charles III.

== Early life ==
Edwyn was the eldest son of Edwyn Andrew Burnaby, (d. 1825), and his wife Mary Browne, daughter and heiress of the Reverend William Browne and his wife Mary Adcock. His grandfather was Andrew Burnaby. He was baptised on 30 September 1798 at Rotherby, Leicestershire, and was probably born the day before as various editions of Burke's Landed Gentry and other published sources give his date of birth as 29 September 1799. His age is given as 19 on matriculation at Worcester College, Oxford on 20 October 1817. He was educated at Christ Church, Oxford.

== Career ==
He served as a captain in the Prince of Wales's Dragoon Guards.

He was also a Justice of the Peace, Deputy Lieutenant, and High Sheriff of Leicestershire in 1864. He succeeded his father in the Court post of Gentleman of the Privy chamber.

== Personal life ==
On 29 August 1829, he married Anne Caroline Salisbury, daughter of Thomas Salisbury (solicitor), by Frances, daughter of Francis Webb. Together, they had several children, including:

- Edwyn Sherard Burnaby (1830–1883), major-general and Member of Parliament
- Caroline Louisa Burnaby (1832–1918), who married the Rev. Charles Cavendish-Bentinck, grandson of the Prime Minister, the 3rd Duke of Portland.

Burnaby died on 18 July 1867.
