= John Sullivan (MP) =

English Member of Parliament (1749–1839)

The Right Honourable John Sullivan PC

Member of Parliament for Ashburton
- In office 1811–1818 Serving with Lord Charles Bentinck, Richard Preston
- Preceded by: Walter Palk; Lord Charles Bentinck
- Succeeded by: Sir Lawrence Vaughan Palk; Sir John Copley

Member of Parliament for Aldborough
- In office 1802–1806 Serving with Charles Duncombe
- Preceded by: John Blackburn; Charles Duncombe
- Succeeded by: Henry Fynes; Gilbert Jones

Member of Parliament for Old Sarum
- In office 1790–1796 Serving with George Hardinge
- Preceded by: George Hardinge; The Hon. John Villiers
- Succeeded by: George Hardinge; The Earl of Mornington

Personal details
- Born: 7 April 1749
- Died: 31 October 1839 (aged 90)
- Spouse: Lady Henrietta Hobart (m. 1789; died 1828)
- Relations: Charles Stuart
- Parent(s): Benjamin Sullivan; Bridget Limric

John Sullivan PC (7 April 1749 – 31 October 1839), of Richings Park, Buckinghamshire, was an English Member of Parliament who served as Under-Secretary of State for War and the Colonies.

== Early life ==
Sullivan was born on 7 April 1749. He was the second son of Benjamin Sullivan of Dromeragh, County Cork, and Bridget Limric. His elder brother Sir Benjamin Sullivan was appointed a Judge in Madras, India in 1801. His younger brother was Sir Richard Sullivan, 1st Baronet, MP for New Romney. His father served as Clerk of the Crown for County Cork and County Waterford.

His maternal grandfather was the Rev. Dr. Paul Limric of Schull, County Cork. Through his brother Richard, he was uncle to Sir Henry Sullivan, 2nd Baronet and Rev. Frederick Sullivan, among others.

He was educated at Greenwich Academy until 1764. Like his brothers Benjamin and Richard, John travelled to India through the influence of their relative, Laurence Sulivan, the Chairman of the British East India Company.

== Career ==
He was a Member of the Parliament of Great Britain for Old Sarum from 1790 to 1796, for Ashburton from 1811 to 1818, and for Aldborough from 1802 to 1806. He held the office of Under-Secretary of State for War and the Colonies between 1801 and 1805 and was appointed Privy Counsellor in 1805.

He lived at Richings Park, Buckinghamshire and was High Sheriff of Buckinghamshire from 1797 to 1798. He was also a trustee of the Westminster Life Assurance Office in 1805, and the British Fire Office in 1811.

== Personal life ==
On 24 May 1789, he married Lady Henrietta Anne Barbara Hobart (c. 1762–1828), a daughter of George Hobart, 3rd Earl of Buckinghamshire and Albinia Bertie (a daughter of Lord Vere Bertie). Together, they were the parents of three sons and five daughters, including:

- Albinia Sullivan (c. 1790–1827), who married Capt. John James Stuart, son of Lt.-Gen. Hon. Sir Charles Stuart and Louisa Bertie (a daughter of Lord Vere Bertie), in 1807. After his death, she married the Rev. Marmaduke Thompson in 1825.
- Harriet Margaret Sullivan (1795–1873), who married Vice-Adm. Sir George Tyler, son of Adm. Sir Charles Tyler and Margaret Leach, in 1819.
- Maria Sullivan (1796–1885), who married the Rt. Rev. Henry Pepys, son of Sir William Pepys, 1st Baronet and Elizabeth Dowdeswell, in 1824.
- John Augustus Sullivan (1798–1871), who married Jane Tyler, daughter of Adm. Sir Charles Tyler and Margaret Leach, in 1826.
- Georgina Vere Sullivan (1804–1879), who married banker Robert Gosling of Botleys House, Chertsey.

Sullivan died on 31 October 1839.

=== Descendants ===
Through his daughter Albinia, he was a grandfather of Gen. Charles Stuart, MP for Buteshire.

Parliament of Great Britain
Preceded by George Hardinge; The Hon. John Villiers	Member of Parliament for Old Sarum; 1790–1796; With: George Hardinge	Succeeded by George Hardinge; The Earl of Mornington
Preceded by John Blackburn; Charles Duncombe	Member of Parliament for Aldborough; 1802–1806; With: Charles Duncombe	Succeeded by Henry Fynes; Gilbert Jones
Preceded by Walter Palk; Lord Charles Bentinck	Member of Parliament for Ashburton; 1811–1818; With: Lord Charles Bentinck; Richard Preston	Succeeded by Sir Lawrence Vaughan Palk; Sir John Copley
Political offices
Preceded by None (previously Under-Secretary of State for War and Under-Secretary of State for the Colonies	Under-Secretary of State for War and the Colonies; 1801–1804	Succeeded by Edward Cooke
