= Lady Charles Bentinck =

British aristocrat (1788–1875)

Lady Charles Cavendish-Bentinck
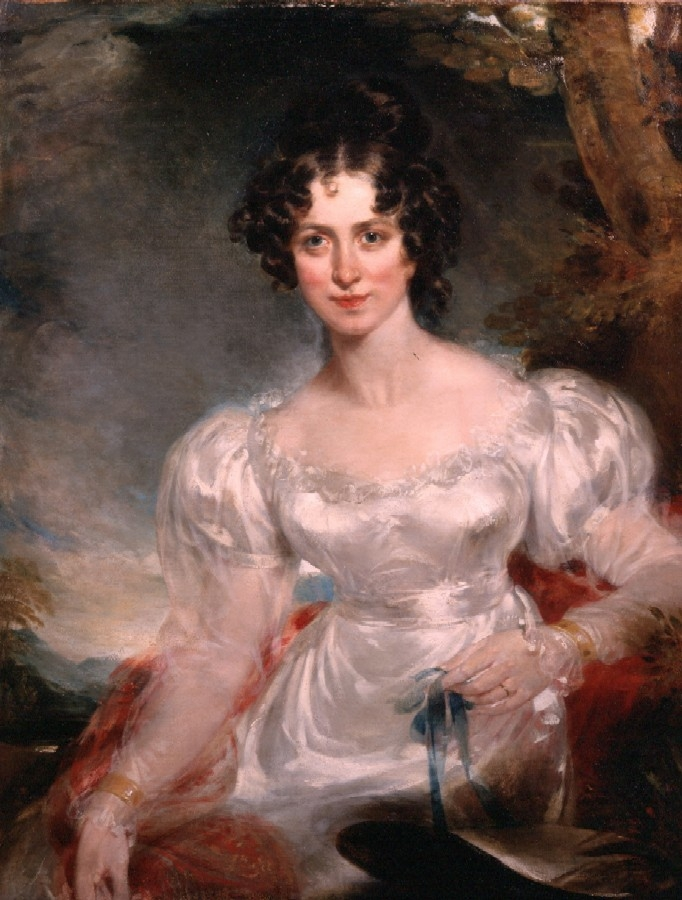
- Portrait by Sir Thomas Lawrence, c. 1825
- Born: 29 February 1788
- Died: 19 March 1875 (aged 87)
- Spouses: Sir William Abdy, 7th Baronet (m. 1806, div. 1816); Lord Charles Cavendish-Bentinck (m. 1816, widowed 1826)
- Issue: 4, including Charles
- Father: Richard Wellesley, 1st Marquess Wellesley
- Mother: Hyacinthe-Gabrielle Roland

Lady Charles Cavendish-Bentinck (born Anne Wellesley; 29 February 1788 – 19 March 1875), known between 1806 and 1816 as Lady Abdy, was a British aristocrat and a great-great-grandmother of Queen Elizabeth II.

== Background ==
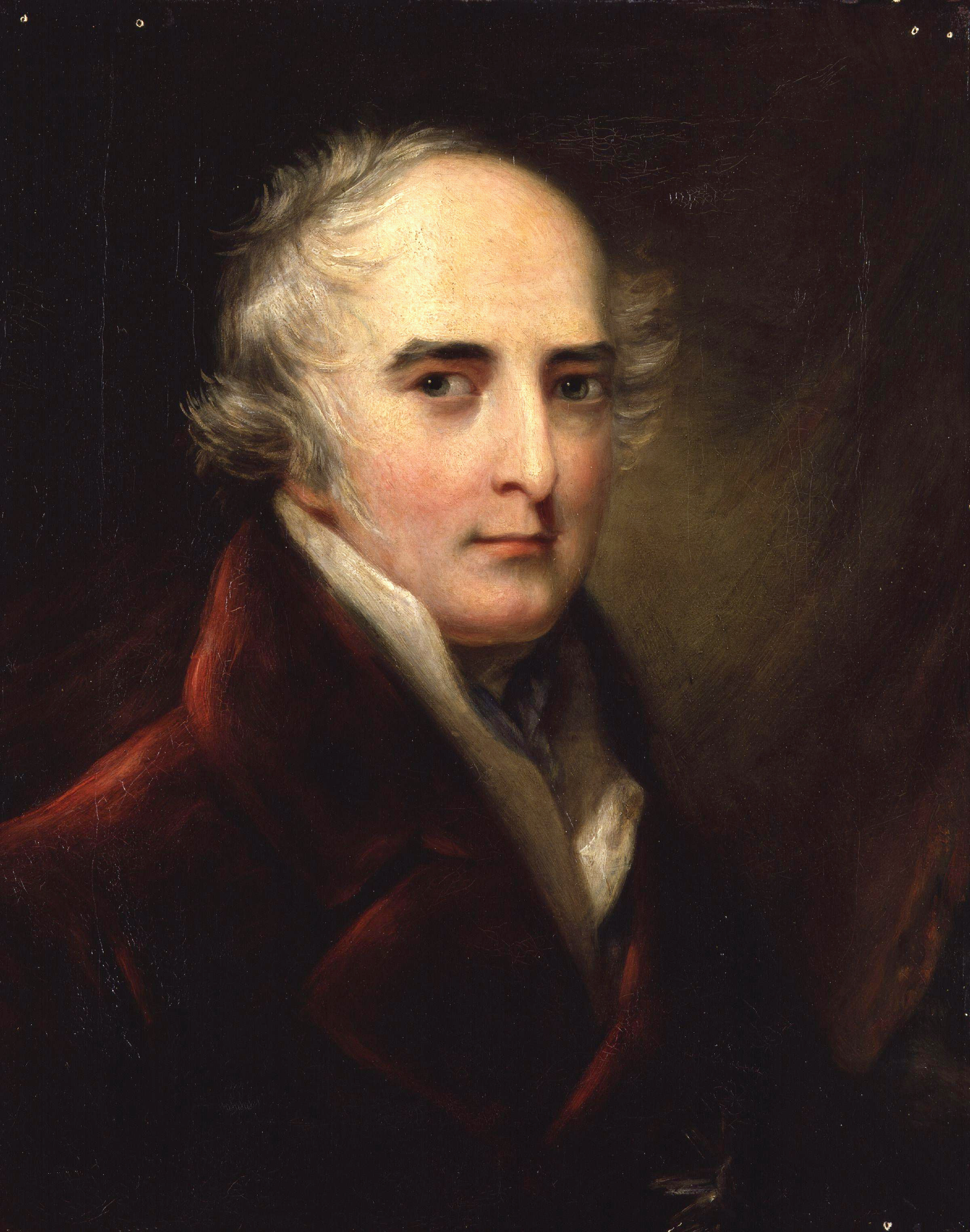
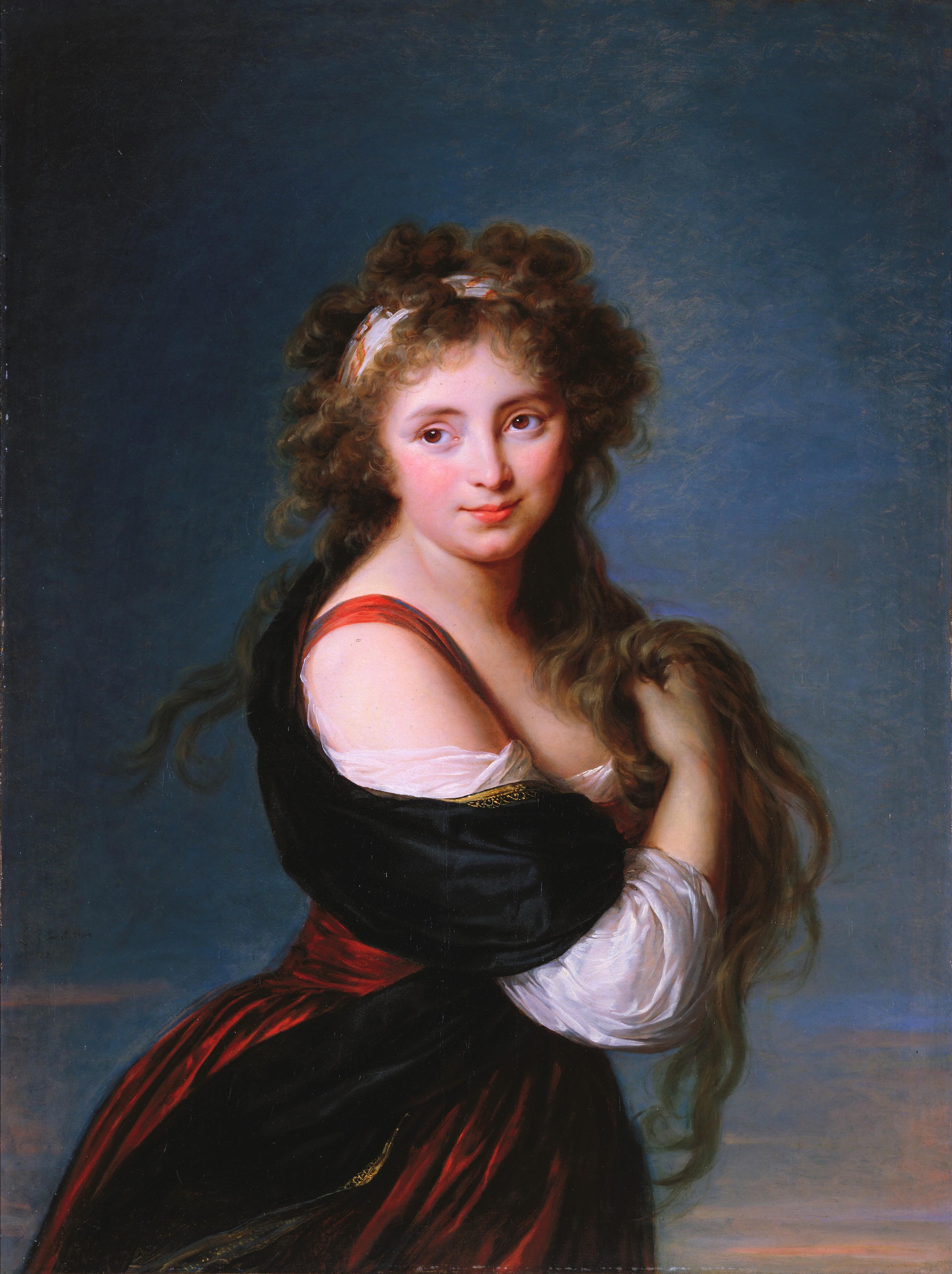
Her parents, the Marquess Wellesley and Hyacinthe-Gabrielle Roland

She was a daughter of Richard Wellesley, 1st Marquess Wellesley, and his mistress, Hyacinthe-Gabrielle Roland, an actress at the Palais Royal. Her parents were married six years after her birth, on 29 March 1794, at which point she was legitimised.

Her paternal grandparents were Garret Wesley, 1st Earl of Mornington, and Anne Hill, daughter of Arthur Hill-Trevor, 1st Viscount Dungannon.

Her paternal uncles included Arthur Wellesley, 1st Duke of Wellington, William Wellesley-Pole, 3rd Earl of Mornington, and Henry Wellesley, 1st Baron Cowley.

== Marriages and children ==
On 3 July 1806, she married her first husband, Sir William Abdy, 7th Baronet. Their marriage lasted nine years, but remained childless.

Abdy had introduced her to his friend Lord Charles Cavendish-Bentinck, a younger son of former British Prime Minister William Cavendish-Bentinck, 3rd Duke of Portland. At some point during her first marriage, Anne and Lord Charles became lovers. They eloped on 5 September 1815, following which Abdy brought a suit for criminal conversation ("crim. con.", in Regency parlance) for 30,000 pounds, but won only 7,000 pounds in damages. During the discussion of the divorce bill, the customary provision against remarriage was struck out in the House of Lords. Sir William Abdy was granted a divorce by royal consent to a special Act of Parliament on 25 June 1816.

Anne and Lord Charles were married on 23 July 1816, enabling their first child (which she was expecting) to be born legitimate three weeks later. They had four children:

- Anne Hyacinthe Cavendish-Bentinck (1 September 1816 – 7 June 1888)
- Emily Cavendish-Bentinck (died 6 June 1850), who married the Rev. Henry Hopwood and had children.
- The Reverend Charles William Frederick Cavendish-Bentinck (8 November 1817 – 17 August 1865):
  - Father to Cecilia Nina Cavendish-Bentinck, maternal grandfather to Queen Elizabeth the Queen Mother and great-grandfather to Queen Elizabeth II.
- Lt.-Gen. Arthur Cavendish-Bentinck (10 May 1819 – 11 December 1877):
  - He married firstly Elizabeth Sophia Hawkins-Whitshed; they were parents of William Cavendish-Bentinck, 6th Duke of Portland.
  - He married secondly Augusta Browne, 1st Baroness Bolsover; they were parents of Lady Ottoline Morrell.

== Ancestors ==
Ancestors of Lady Charles Bentinck

8. Richard Wesley, 1st Baron Mornington
4. Garret Wesley, 1st Earl of Mornington
9. Elizabeth Sale
2. Richard Wellesley, 1st Marquess Wellesley
10. Arthur Hill-Trevor, 1st Viscount Dungannon
5. The Hon. Anne Hill-Trevor
11. Anne Stafford
1. Lady Anne Wellesley
6. Pierre Roland
3. Hyacinthe-Gabrielle Roland
7. Hyacinthe-Gabrielle Varis
