= Governor Wellesley =

Governor Wellesley may refer to:

- Arthur Wellesley, 1st Duke of Wellington (1769–1852), Governor of Plymouth from 1819 from 1827
- Richard Wellesley, 1st Marquess Wellesley (1760–1842), Governor-General of India from 1798 to 1805
