= Lord Bentinck =

Lord Bentinck may refer to:

- Lord George Bentinck (1802–1848), English Conservative politician and racehorse owner
- Lord William Bentinck (1774–1839), British soldier and statesman

== See also ==
- Lord Charles Bentinck (1780–1826), British soldier and politician
