= Richard Preston (disambiguation) =

Richard Preston (born 1954) is an American writer.

Richard Preston may also refer to:

- Richard Preston (MP) (1768–1850), English legal author and politician
- Richard Preston (clergyman) (c. 1791–1861), Nova Scotia religious leader and abolitionist
- Richard Preston, 1st Earl of Desmond (died 1628), Scottish court favourite of King James VI
- Richard Franklin Preston (1860–1929), Canadian physician and political figure
- Richard Preston, a pen-name of Jack Lindsay (1900–1990) Australian-born British author
