= Lord Charles Bentinck =

British politician (1780–1826)

Lieutenant-Colonel The Right Honourable Lord Charles Cavendish-Bentinck

Treasurer of the Household
- In office 29 July 1812 – 28 April 1826
- Monarchs: George III; George IV
- Prime Minister: The Earl of Liverpool
- Preceded by: Viscount Jocelyn
- Succeeded by: Sir William Henry Fremantle

Personal details
- Born: Lord William Charles Augustus Cavendish-Bentinck; 20 May 1780 Burlington House, Westminster
- Died: 28 April 1826 (aged 45) Mayfair, London
- Spouses: Georgiana Seymour (m. 1808; died 1813); Anne Wellesley (m. 1816)
- Children: 4, including Charles
- Parents: William Cavendish-Bentinck, 3rd Duke of Portland (father); Lady Dorothy Cavendish (mother)

Lord William Charles Augustus Cavendish-Bentinck (20 May 1780 – 28 April 1826), known as Lord Charles Bentinck, was a British soldier and politician.

== Background ==
Bentinck was the third son of British Prime Minister William Cavendish-Bentinck, 3rd Duke of Portland and Lady Dorothy (1750–1794), only daughter of Prime Minister William Cavendish, 4th Duke of Devonshire. William Bentinck, 4th Duke of Portland, and Lord William Bentinck were his older brothers.

He was born on 20 May 1780 at Burlington House, Piccadilly.

== Political career ==
Bentinck was returned to Parliament for Ashburton in 1806, a seat he held until 1812. He served under the Earl of Liverpool as Treasurer of the Household between 1812 and 1826.

== Family ==
Bentinck married, firstly, Georgiana Augusta Frederica Seymour (baptised Elliott) (1782 – 10 December 1813), daughter of the courtesan Grace Elliott on 21 September 1808; she was said to be a daughter of the Prince of Wales or of the 4th Earl of Cholmondeley, both men claiming her paternity. They had one daughter, who was raised after Georgiana's death by Lord Cholmondeley at Cholmondeley Castle:

- Georgiana Augusta Frederica Henrietta Cavendish Bentinck (21 August 1811 – 12 September 1883).

The marriage enabled Bentinck to become Treasurer of the Household in 1812, a position he held till death, despite his involvement in a notorious divorce suit and his subsequent remarriage.

In 1815, Bentinck eloped with his mistress, Anne, Lady Abdy, natural daughter of Richard Wellesley, 1st Marquess Wellesley by Hyacinthe-Gabrielle Roland. Lady Abdy was the wife of Bentinck's friend Sir William Abdy, 7th Baronet. Following the elopement, Lady Abdy was divorced by her husband. She and Bentinck were married on 23 July 1816. They had four children:

- Reverend Charles William Frederick Cavendish-Bentinck (8 November 1817 – 17 August 1865). He was a great-grandfather of Queen Elizabeth II through his daughter, who married Claude Bowes-Lyon, 14th Earl of Strathmore and Kinghorne.
- Anne Hyacinthe Cavendish-Bentinck (1 September 1816 – 7 June 1888), christened on 14 May 1818. Died in Cannes in 1888, unmarried.
- Lieutenant General Arthur Cavendish-Bentinck (10 May 1819 – 11 December 1877). He married first Elizabeth Sophia Hawkins-Whitshed. They were parents of William Cavendish-Bentinck, 6th Duke of Portland. He married secondly Augusta Browne, 1st Baroness Bolsover, and they had three sons and a daughter, Lady Ottoline Morrell.
- Emily Cavendish-Bentinck (1820 – 6 June 1850), married Henry Hopwood.

== Abdy-Cavendish divorce ==
Anne and Lord Charles became lovers at some point during her first marriage. They eloped on 5 September 1815, following which Abdy brought a suit for criminal conversation (crim.con. in Regency parlance) for 30,000 pounds but won only 7,000 pounds in damages. (These damages were never paid by the impecunious Bentinck). During the discussion of the divorce bill, the customary provision against remarriage was struck out in the House of Lords. Lady Abdy (or rather, her husband Sir William Abdy) was granted a divorce on 25 June 1816. Anne and Lord Charles were married on 23 July 1816, enabling their first child (which she was expecting) to be born legitimate three weeks later.

Bentinck collapsed and died suddenly at age 45 while undressing at his apartment in Park Lane, and was quickly discovered by his footman. Dr. Sir Henry Halford diagnosed a blood aneurysm as cause of death. His wife survived him by almost 50 years and died in March 1875.

== Ancestors ==
Ancestors of Lord Charles Bentinck

8. Henry Bentinck, 1st Duke of Portland
4. William Bentinck, 2nd Duke of Portland
9. Lady Elizabeth Noel
2. William Cavendish-Bentinck, 3rd Duke of Portland
10. Edward Harley, 2nd Earl of Oxford and Earl Mortimer
5. Lady Margaret Harley
11. Lady Henrietta Holles
1. Lord Charles Bentinck
12. William Cavendish, 3rd Duke of Devonshire
6. William Cavendish, 4th Duke of Devonshire
13. Catherine Hoskins
3. Lady Dorothy Cavendish
14. Richard Boyle, 3rd Earl of Burlington
7. Charlotte Boyle, 6th Baroness Clifford
15. Lady Dorothy Savile

Parliament of the United Kingdom
Preceded by Walter Palk; Hon. Gilbert Elliot	Member of Parliament for Ashburton; 1807–1812; With: Hon. Gilbert Elliot 1807–1811; John Sullivan 1811–1812	Succeeded by John Sullivan; Richard Preston
Political offices
Preceded by Viscount Jocelyn	Treasurer of the Household; 1812–1826	Succeeded by Sir William Henry Fremantle
