= Charles Stuart (British Army officer, born 1810) =

British soldier and politician (1810–1892)

General Charles Stuart DL JP

Member of Parliament for Buteshire
- In office 1832–1833
- Preceded by: Sir William Rae
- Succeeded by: Sir William Rae

Personal details
- Born: 16 March 1810
- Died: 9 September 1892 (aged 82)
- Spouse(s): Georgiana Gore (m. 1839; died 1877) Louisa Gambier Murdoch (m. 1878; died 1892)
- Relations: Sir Charles Stuart (grandfather); John Sullivan (grandfather); Charles Stuart, 1st Baron Stuart de Rothesay (uncle)
- Parent(s): John James Stuart; Albinia Sullivan

Military service
- Allegiance: United Kingdom
- Branch/service: British Army
- Rank: General

General Charles Stuart DL JP (16 March 1810 – 9 September 1892) was a British politician and an officer in the British Army.

== Early life ==
Stuart was born on 16 March 1810, the son of Capt. John James Stuart (1782–1811) and Albinia Sullivan (d. 1827). His father died aboard his command, the frigate HMS Saldanha in 1811. After his father's death, his mother married the Rev. Marmaduke Thompson in 1825. After his mother's death in 1827, Rev. Thompson married Lucy Bird (a sister of Robert Merttins Bird).

His paternal grandparents were Gen. Hon. Sir Charles Stuart (younger son of Prime-Minister John Stuart, 3rd Earl of Bute) and Louisa Bertie (a daughter of Lord Vere Bertie). Through his paternal uncle, Charles Stuart, 1st Baron Stuart de Rothesay (who married Lady Elizabeth Margaret Yorke, a daughter of the 3rd Earl of Hardwicke), he was a first cousin of Hon. Charlotte Stuart (wife of Charles Canning, 1st Earl Canning) and Hon. Louisa Anne Stuart (wife of Henry Beresford, 3rd Marquess of Waterford). His maternal grandparents were Rt. Hon. John Sullivan and Lady Henrietta Anne Barbara Hobart (a daughter of the 3rd Earl of Buckinghamshire).

== Career ==
Stuart was Colonel of the 2nd Battalion, Duke of Cornwall's Light Infantry. He served as a Deputy Lieutenant of Bute and as a Justice of the Peace for Bute.

Stuart was elected as the Member of Parliament for Buteshire at the 1832, but resigned in 1833.

== Personal life ==
On 4 September 1839, Stuart married Georgiana Gore (1810–1877), a daughter of Admiral Sir John Gore and Georgiana Montagu (a daughter of Admiral Sir George Montagu). They resided at Hoburne, Christchurch in Hampshire, and his wife served as a Maid of Honour to Queen Adelaide (consort of King William IV).

After the death of his first wife in 1877, he married Louisa Gambier Murdoch (1843–1897) on 24 September 1878. Louisa was a daughter of James Gordon Murdoch, of Ashfold, Sussex and Caroline Penelope Gambier (a daughter of Samuel Gambier and sister of Sir Edward John Gambier). His second wife's brother, Charles Townshend Murdoch, was MP for Reading.

Stuart died, without issue, on 9 September 1892, at the age of 82.

Parliament of the United Kingdom
Vacant alternating constituency with Caithness Title last held by Sir William Rae to 1831	Member of Parliament for Buteshire; 1832 – 1833	Succeeded by Sir William Rae
