= Hyacinthe-Gabrielle Wellesley, Marchioness Wellesley =

French actress (c. 1766 – 1816)

The Most Honourable The Marchioness Wellesley
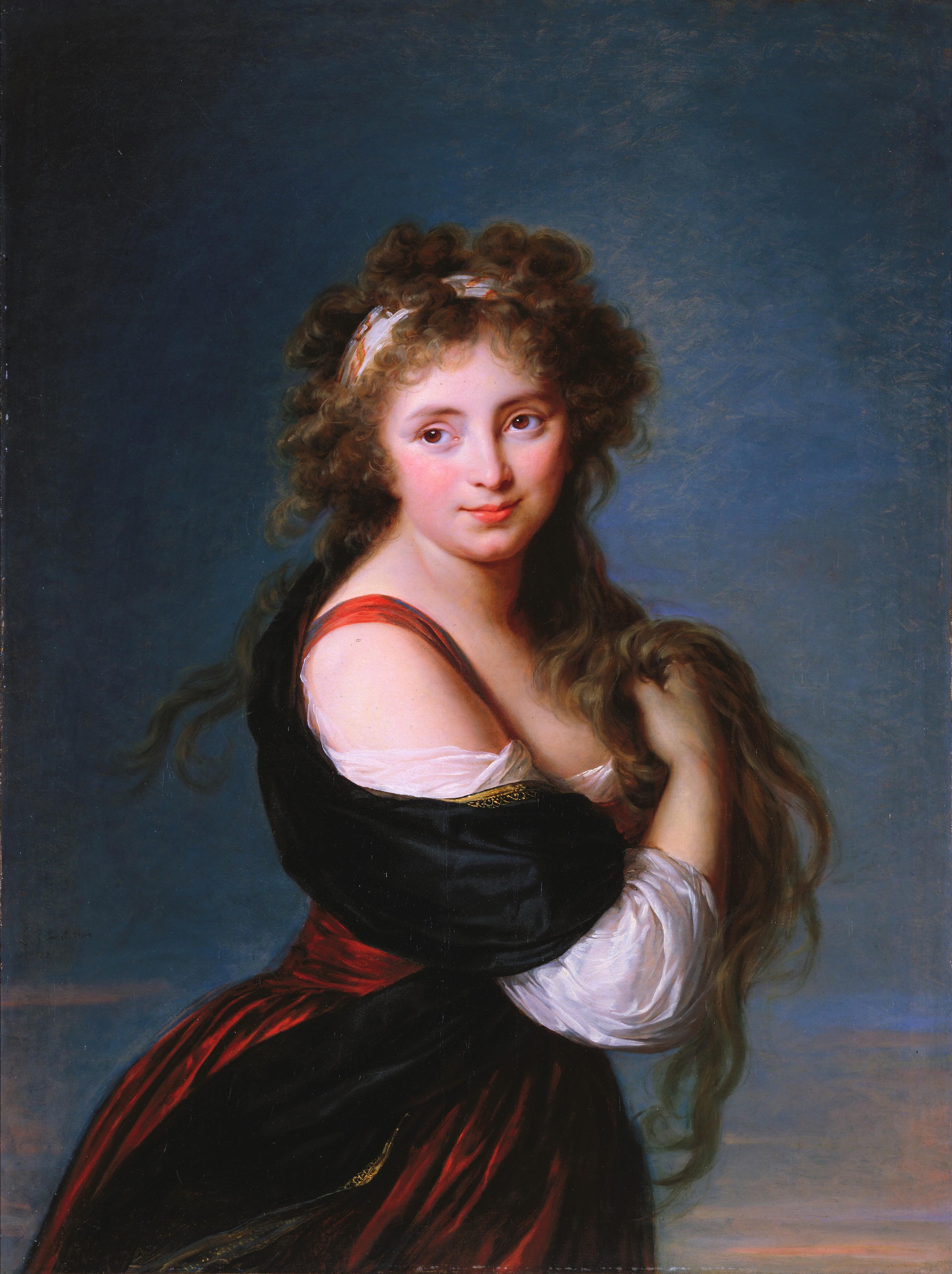
- Portrait of Hyacinthe Gabrielle Roland by Élisabeth Vigée Le Brun, 1791
- Born: Hyacinthe-Gabrielle Rolland c. 1766; Paris, France
- Died: 5 November 1816 (aged 55–56); Teddesley Hall, Staffordshire, England
- Resting place: St Michael's Church, Penkridge, Staffordshire
- Other names: Hyacinthe-Gabrielle Fagan
- Spouse: Richard Wellesley, 1st Marquess Wellesley (m. 1794)
- Children: Richard Wellesley; Anne Wellesley; Hyacinthe Mary Wellesley; Gerald Wellesley; Henry Wellesley

Hyacinthe-Gabrielle Wellesley, Marchioness Wellesley (née Rolland; c. 1766 – 5 November 1816) was a French actress who became the mistress, and later the wife, of Richard Wellesley, 1st Marquess Wellesley. As an actress, she was known as Gabrielle Fagan. Through her daughter, Anne, Rolland was a great-great-great grandmother of Queen Elizabeth II.

== Birth and paternity ==
Rolland was the legal daughter of Pierre Rolland, a Paris merchant, and Hyacinthe-Gabrielle Varis, an actress and milliner. The University of Southampton, which houses the Wellesley family papers, estimates Rolland's birth year to be 1760. Cockayne's The Complete Peerage and Burke's Peerage estimate her birth year to be between 1766 and 1771 in editions published after her death.

It was rumoured Rolland's biological father was an Irish gentleman, Christopher Alexander Fagan (1733–1816), the son of Patrick Fagan, and she was later adopted by Pierre Rolland. The 1976 edition of Burke's Irish Family Records listed Rolland as a natural born daughter of Fagan.

== Marriage ==
Richard Wellesley, the son of Garret Wesley, 1st Earl of Mornington, met Rolland at the Palais-Royal where she was an actress known as Gabrielle Fagan. She spoke no English at the time; however, she and Wellesley lived together for eight years without marrying. In 1781, Richard Wellesley succeeded as 2nd Earl of Mornington.

Rolland and Wellesley married on 29 November 1794 at St George's, Hanover Square, London. Prior to their marriage, they had three sons and two daughters:

- Richard Wellesley (1787–1831), a Member of Parliament
- Anne Wellesley (1788–1875), married firstly Sir William Abdy, 7th Baronet, and secondly Lieutenant-Colonel Lord Charles Bentinck. Great-great-grandmother to Elizabeth II.
- Hyacinthe Mary Wellesley (1789–1849), married Edward Littleton, 1st Baron Hatherton
- Gerald Wellesley (1792–1833), served as the East India Company's resident at Indore.
- Rev. Henry Wellesley (1794–1866), Principal of New Inn Hall, Oxford.

Rolland became the Countess of Mornington upon marriage, but she was a social outcast, though Wellesley's mother, Anne, was eventually persuaded to receive her. In 1799, Wellesley was created the 1st Marquess Wellesley, making Rolland a marchioness. However, this elevation did not change her social standing. Even the famously casual Viscountess Melbourne refused to call on Rolland. The Viscountess Melbourne scolded her daughter-in-law, Lady Caroline Lamb, severely for doing so, writing of Caroline's friendship with Rolland: "you are the only woman with any pretensions to character who ever courted Lady Wellesley's acquaintance".

== Separation and death ==
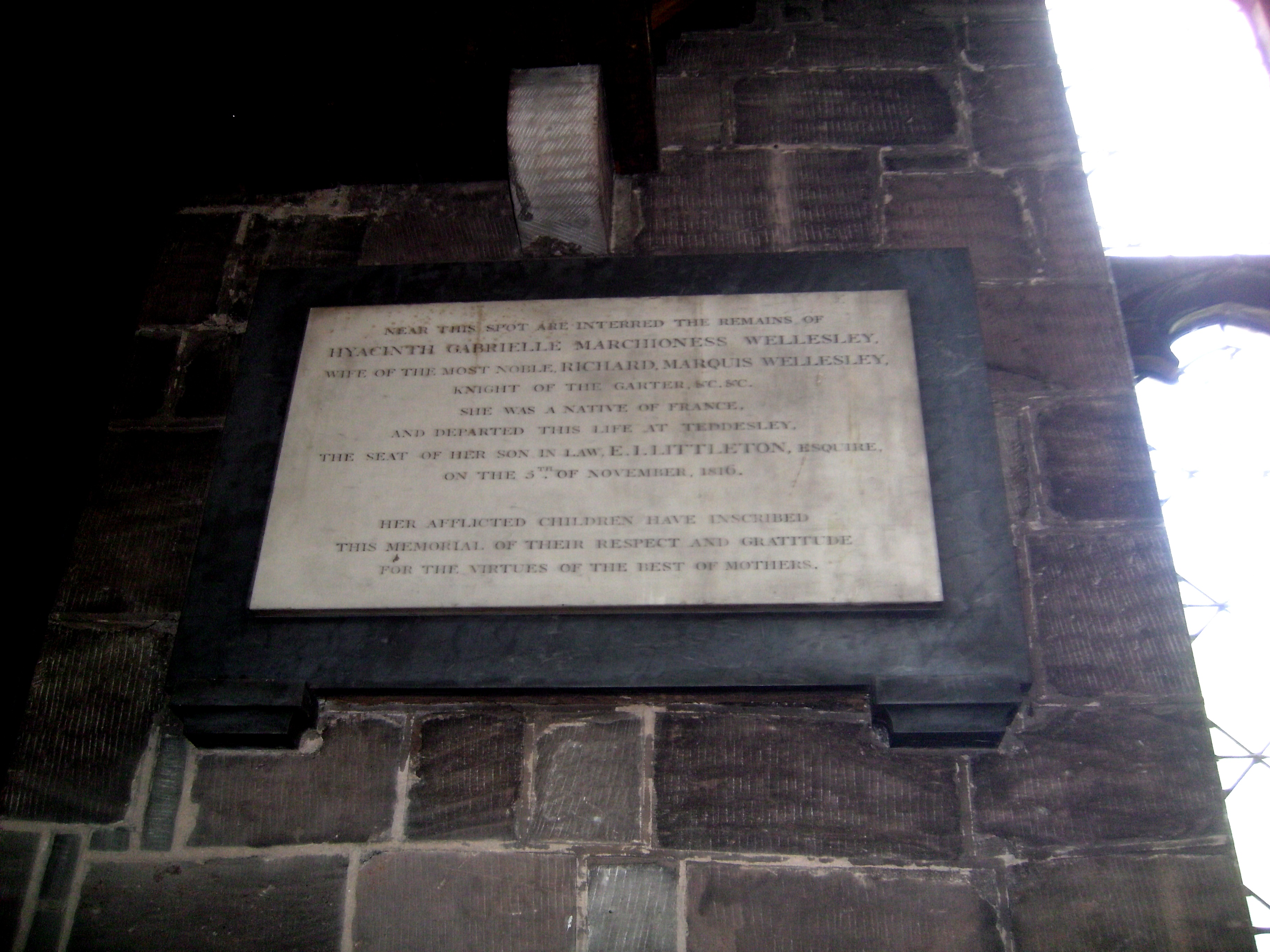
Memorial at St. Michael's Church, Penkridge

After their marriage, the Marquess Wellesley had two illegitimate children by another mistress, Elizabeth Johnston. In 1797, the Marquess Wellesley was obliged to travel to India in his capacity as Governor-General, Rolland did not accompany him although he attempted to persuade her on many occasions. Rolland was seeking evidence for a divorce as early as 1795.

In 1801, Rolland's letters detailed accusations of her husband's infidelity with another woman, known only as Madame de Cocrement, and of severe neglect of his family. Upon the Marquess Wellesley's return to Britain in 1805, he purchased Apsley House as a family home. However, he took another mistress, and he and Rolland were again estranged. The Wellesleys formally separated in 1810, and Rolland moved from Apsley House. She lived in Grosvenor Square for some time, and then at Great Cumberland Place.

Rolland died on 5 November 1816 at Teddesley Hall, Staffordshire, a house belonging to Edward Littleton, the husband to her daughter Hyacinthe-Marie. She was laid to rest at St. Michael's Church in Penkridge where her family posted a memorial.
