= Richard Wellesley, 1st Marquess Wellesley =

British politician (1760–1842)

The Most Honourable The Marquess Wellesley KG KP PC PC (Ire)
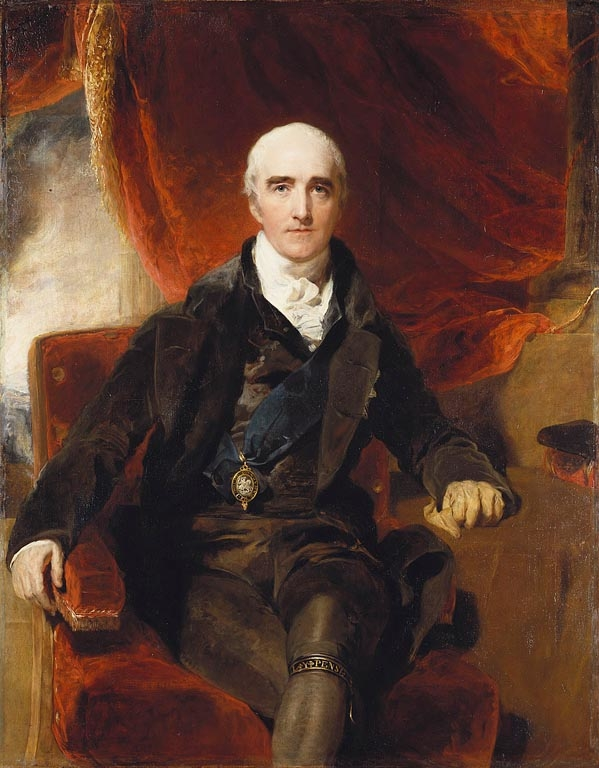
- Portrait of the Marquess Wellesley by Sir Thomas Lawrence, c. 1813

Lord Lieutenant of Ireland
- In office 8 December 1821 – 27 February 1828
- Monarch: George IV
- Prime Minister: The Earl of Liverpool; George Canning; The Viscount Goderich; The Duke of Wellington
- Preceded by: The Earl Talbot
- Succeeded by: The Marquess of Anglesey
- In office 12 September 1833 – November 1834
- Monarch: William IV
- Prime Minister: The Earl Grey; The Duke of Wellington
- Preceded by: The Marquess of Anglesey
- Succeeded by: The Earl of Haddington

Secretary of State for Foreign Affairs
- In office 6 December 1809 – 4 March 1812
- Monarch: George III
- Prime Minister: Spencer Perceval
- Preceded by: The Earl Bathurst
- Succeeded by: Viscount Castlereagh

Governor-General of the Presidency of Fort William
- In office 18 May 1798 – 30 July 1805
- Monarch: George III
- Prime Minister: William Pitt the Younger; Henry Addington
- Preceded by: Sir Alured Clarke (provisional)
- Succeeded by: The Marquess Cornwallis

Personal details
- Born: 20 June 1760 Dangan Castle, County Meath, Ireland
- Died: 26 September 1842 (aged 82) Knightsbridge, London, United Kingdom of Great Britain and Ireland
- Resting place: Eton College Chapel
- Party: Tory
- Spouses: Hyacinthe-Gabrielle Roland (m. 1794; died 1816); Marianne (Caton) Patterson (m. 1825)
- Children: 5, including Richard, Anne, and Henry
- Parents: Garret Wesley (father); Anne Hill-Trevor (mother)
- Education: Christ Church, Oxford

Richard Colley Wellesley, 1st Marquess Wellesley, KG, KP, PC, PC (Ire) (20 June 1760 – 26 September 1842) was an Anglo-Irish politician and colonial administrator. He was styled as Viscount Wellesley until 1781, when he succeeded his father as 2nd Earl of Mornington. In 1799, he was granted the Irish peerage title of Marquess Wellesley of Norragh. He was also Baron Wellesley in the Peerage of Great Britain.

Richard Wellesley first made his name as fifth Governor-General of Bengal between 1798 and 1805. He later served as Foreign Secretary in the British Cabinet and as Lord Lieutenant of Ireland. In 1799, his forces invaded Mysore and defeated Tipu, the Sultan of Mysore, in a major battle. He also initiated the Second Anglo-Maratha War.

Wellesley was the eldest son of Garret Wesley, 1st Earl of Mornington, an Irish peer, and Anne, the eldest daughter of Arthur Hill-Trevor, 1st Viscount Dungannon. His younger brother was Field Marshal, the Duke of Wellington Arthur Wellesley.

== Early life ==
Wellesley was born in 1760 in Dangan Castle in County Meath, Ireland, where his family was part of the Ascendancy, the old Anglo-Irish aristocracy. He was educated at the Royal School, Armagh, Harrow School and Eton College, where he distinguished himself as a classical scholar, and at Christ Church, Oxford. He is one of the few men known to have attended both Harrow and Eton.

In 1780, he entered the Irish House of Commons as the member for Trim until the following year when, at his father's death, he became 2nd Earl of Mornington, taking his seat in the Irish House of Lords. He was elected Grand Master of the Grand Lodge of Ireland in 1782, a post he held for the following year. Due to the extravagance of his father and grandfather, he found himself so indebted that he was ultimately forced to sell all the Irish estates. However, in 1781, he was appointed to the coveted position of Custos Rotulorum of Meath.

In 1784, he joined also the British House of Commons as member for the rotten borough of Bere Alston in Devon. Soon afterwards he was appointed a Lord of the Treasury by William Pitt the Younger.

The 1792 Slave Trade Bill passed the House of Commons. Mangled and mutilated by the modifications and amendments of Pitt, the Earl of Mornington, Edward James Eliot and the Attorney General, it lay for years in the House of Lords.

In 1793, he became a member of the Board of Control over Indian affairs. In 1797 he was appointed Governor-General of India. In 1799 he arrived in Fort St. George, Madras for the war against Tipu Sultan, he built a small hunting lodge in the outskirts of the city, later used by Arthur Wellesley for his time away from the heat of Fort St.George.

== India ==
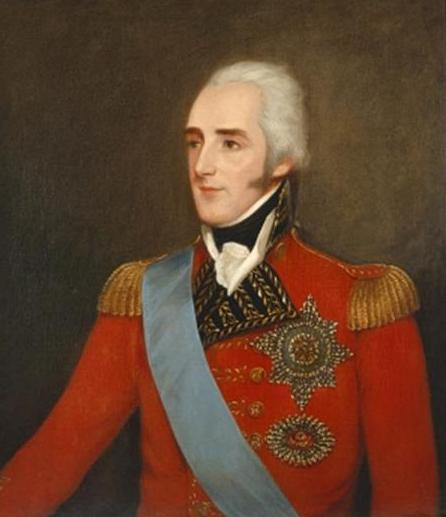
Portrait of Wellesley ca. 1803 in officer's uniform with star and sash of the Order of St Patrick, painted by Robert Home.

=== Voyage ===
According to biographers of Wellesley, his highest priority during his term as Governor-General of India was for Britain to prevail over French power in India. This was a period in which Britain organized a series of military coalitions in Europe against France. His voyage to India is mentioned briefly in Robert William Eastwick's biography, as he transported his younger brother, Arthur Wellesley from Madras to Calcutta to meet Richard Wellesley.

=== Governor-General ===
==== War with Mysore ====
On the voyage out, he formed the design of curbing French influence in the Deccan. Soon after his arrival, in April 1798, he learned that an alliance was being negotiated between Tipu Sultan and France. He soon after was appointed Governor-General of Bengal on May 12, replacing Lord Cornwallis. Wellesley resolved to anticipate the action of the Sultan and ordered preparations for war. The first step was to order the disbandment of the French troops employed by the Nizam of Hyderabad.

The capture of Mysore followed in February 1799, and the campaign was brought to a swift conclusion by the capture of Seringapatam on 4 May 1799 and the death of Tipu Sultan, who was killed in action. Wellesley is widely attributed with the toast, "Ladies and gentlemen, I drink to the corpse of India," following the 1799 defeat of Tipu Sultan. Historians have identified the phrase as a modern invention originating in Bhagwan Gidwani's 1976 historical novel, The Sword of Tipu Sultan. In 1803, the restoration of the Peshwa, Baji Rao II, proved the prelude to the war against Daulat Rao Sindhia of Gwalior and the raja of Berar, Raghoji II Bhonsle in which his brother Arthur took a leading role.

The result of these wars and of the treaties which followed them was that French influence in India was reduced to Pondicherry, and that Britain acquired increased influence in the heartlands of central India. He proved to be a skilled administrator, and picked two of his talented brothers for his staff: Arthur was his military adviser, and Henry was his personal secretary. He founded Fort William College, a training centre intended for those who would be involved in governing India. In connection with this college, he established the governor-general's office, to which civilians who had shown talent at the college were transferred, in order that they might learn something of the highest statesmanship in the immediate service of their chief. He endeavoured to remove some of the restrictions on the trade between Europe and Asia. He took the time to publish an appreciation of British composer Harriet Wainwright's opera Comala in the Calcutta Post on 27 April 1804. During his tenure the magnificent Government House in Calcutta was built as a residence for the governor-general.

=== Policies ===
Both the commercial policy of Wellesley and his educational projects brought him into hostility with the court of directors of the East India Company, and he more than once tendered his resignation, which, however, public necessities led him to postpone till the autumn of 1805. He reached England just in time to see Pitt before his death.

He had been created a Peer of Great Britain in 1797 as Baron Wellesley, and in 1799 became Marquess Wellesley in the Peerage of Ireland. (Note: Having hoped to receive the Order of the Garter, Wellesley was much disappointed by an Irish peerage, which he contemptuously referred to as a "double-gilt potato.") He formed an enormous collection of over 2,500 painted miniatures in the Company style of Indian natural history.

He founded short-lived 'The Institution for Promoting the Natural History' in 1801 at Barrackpore near Calcutta. The institution was supervised by Francis Buchanan-Hamilton. As a part of this endeavor 'Barrackpore Menagerie' was founded which survived till 1878 when animals and birds were transferred to Alipore which later became Calcutta Zoo.

A motion by James Paull MP to impeach Wellesley due to his expulsion of British traders from Oudh was defeated in the House of Commons by 182 votes to 31 in 1808. Wellesley also disapproved of liaisons between Company officials and soldiers and locals, seeing them as improper.

== Britain ==
=== Re-entering Parliament ===
After his governorship ended in 1808, he returned to Britain and began to join British politics yet again. The few years back in Parliament were quite uneventful, despite the overwhelming crisis the British government faced with the war in Europe and its domination by Napoleon Bonaparte. The growing French influence threatened Britain and its empire to the extent of causing high tensions in the country. While the crisis abroad wasn't enough, the British government had been led by weak and unsuited men from 1806 to 1809 with two short-lived ministries under Lord Grenville and the Duke of Portland respectively.

But when on the fall of the Ministry of All the Talents in 1807, Wellesley was invited by George III to join the Duke of Portland's cabinet, he declined, pending the discussion in parliament of certain charges brought against him in respect of his tenure as governor-general and because of criticism of his administration. Resolutions condemning him for the abuse of power were moved in both the Lords and Commons but defeated by large majorities.

=== Ambassador to Spain ===
In 1809, Wellesley was soon appointed as the British ambassador to Spain by Spencer Perceval. He landed at Cádiz just after the Allies victory at the Battle of Talavera, and he tried to bring the Spanish government into an effective co-operative agreement to support the campaign against the French with his brother, Sir Arthur Wellesley who was commander-in-chief of the British Forces. However, the failure of his allies to cooperate with the British soon forced both allies to retreat after French counter-attacks.

=== Foreign Secretary ===
A few months later, after a dispute between George Canning and Robert Stewart, Viscount Castlereagh led to a duel and soon led to the resignation of both ministers, Spencer Perceval offered Wellesley the post of Foreign Secretary in his cabinet, which he accepted. Unlike his brother Arthur, he was an eloquent speaker, but was subject to inexplicable "black-outs" when he was apparently unaware of his surroundings.

He held this office until February 1812, when he retired, partly from dissatisfaction at the inadequate support given to Wellington by the ministry, but also because he had become convinced that the question of Catholic emancipation could no longer be kept in the background. From early life, Wellesley had, like his brother Arthur, been an advocate of Catholic emancipation, and from then on he publicly supported that cause.

Twice Lord Lieutenant of Ireland, and one of the original Knights of St Patrick, he surrendered that order on being made a Knight of the Garter on 31 March 1812.

Upon Perceval's assassination he, along with Canning, refused to join Lord Liverpool's administration, and he remained out of office until 1821, severely criticising the proceedings of the Congress of Vienna and the European settlement of 1814, which, while it reduced France to its ancient limits, left to the other great powers the territory that they had acquired by the Partitions of Poland and the destruction of the Republic of Venice.

He was one of the peers who signed the protest against the enactment of the Corn Laws in 1815. His reputation never fully recovered from a fiasco in 1812 when he was expected to make a crucial speech denouncing the new government, but suffered one of his notorious "black-outs" and sat motionless in his place.

== Family life ==
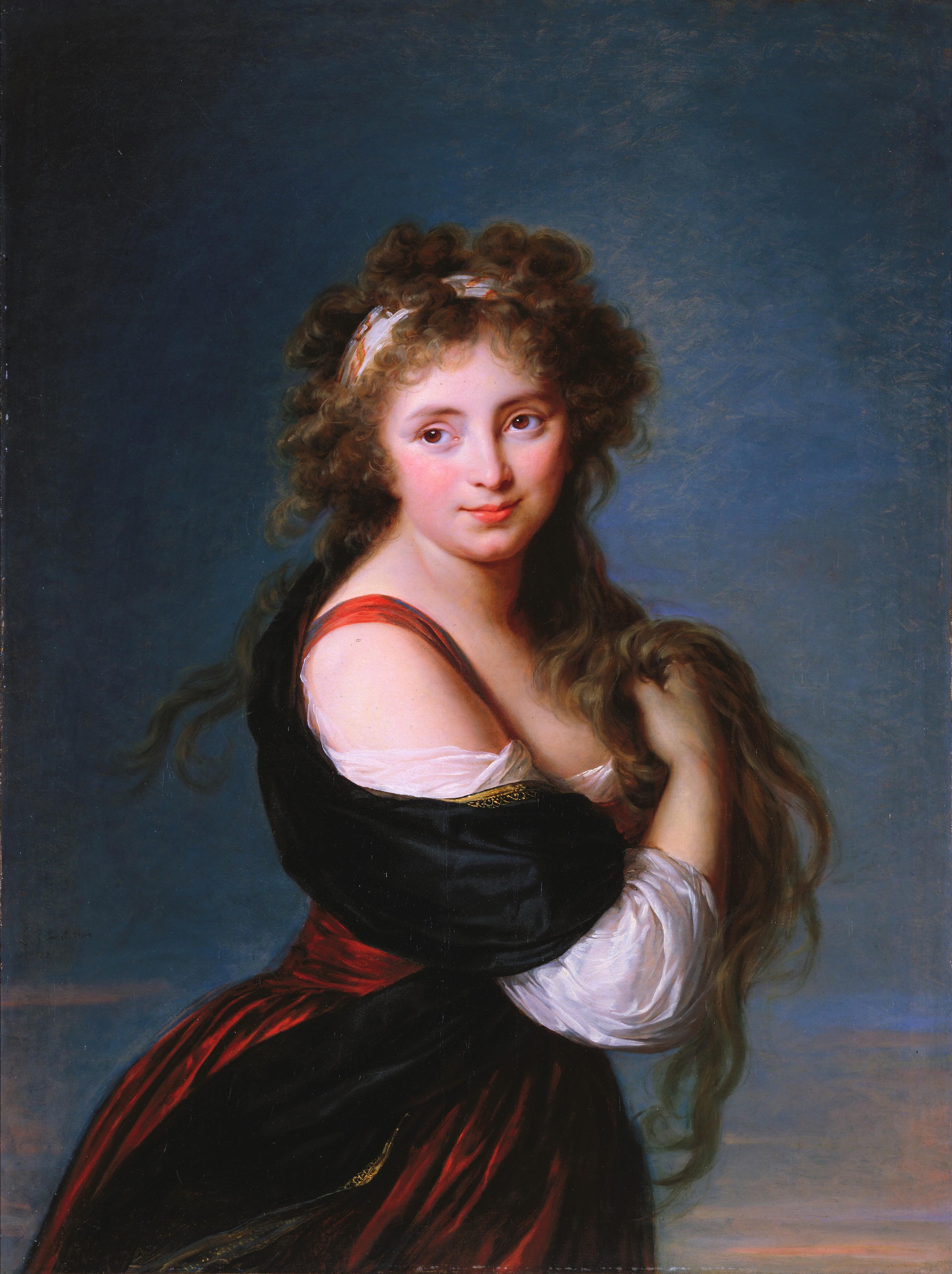
Portrait of Hyacinthe Gabrielle Roland by Élisabeth Vigée Le Brun, 1791

Wellesley lived together for many years with Hyacinthe-Gabrielle Roland, an actress at the Palais Royal. She had three sons and two daughters with Wellesley before he married her on 29 November 1794. He moved her to London, where Hyacinthe was generally miserable, as she never learned English and she was scorned by high society: Lady Caroline Lamb was warned by her mother-in-law, Elizabeth Milbanke, a noted judge of what was socially acceptable, that no respectable woman could afford to be seen in Hyacinthe's company.

Their children were:

- Richard Wellesley (1787–1831), a member of parliament
- Anne Wellesley (1788–1875), who married firstly Sir William Abdy, 7th Baronet, and secondly Lieutenant-Colonel Lord Charles Bentinck. She and her second husband are ancestors of King Charles III.
- Hyacinthe Mary Wellesley (1789–1849), who married Edward Littleton, 1st Baron Hatherton
- Gerald Wellesley (1792–1833), who served as the East India Company's resident at Indore.
- Henry Wellesley (1794–1866), Principal of New Inn Hall, Oxford.

Through his eldest daughter Lady Charles Bentinck, Wellesley was a great-great-great-grandfather to Queen Elizabeth II.

Wellesley also had at least two other illegitimate sons by his teenage mistress, Elizabeth Johnston, including Edward (later his father's secretary), born in Middlesex (1796–1877). Wellesley's children were seen by Richard's other relatives, including his brother Arthur, as greedy, unattractive and cunning, and as exercising an unhealthy influence over their father; in the family circle they were nicknamed "The Parasites".

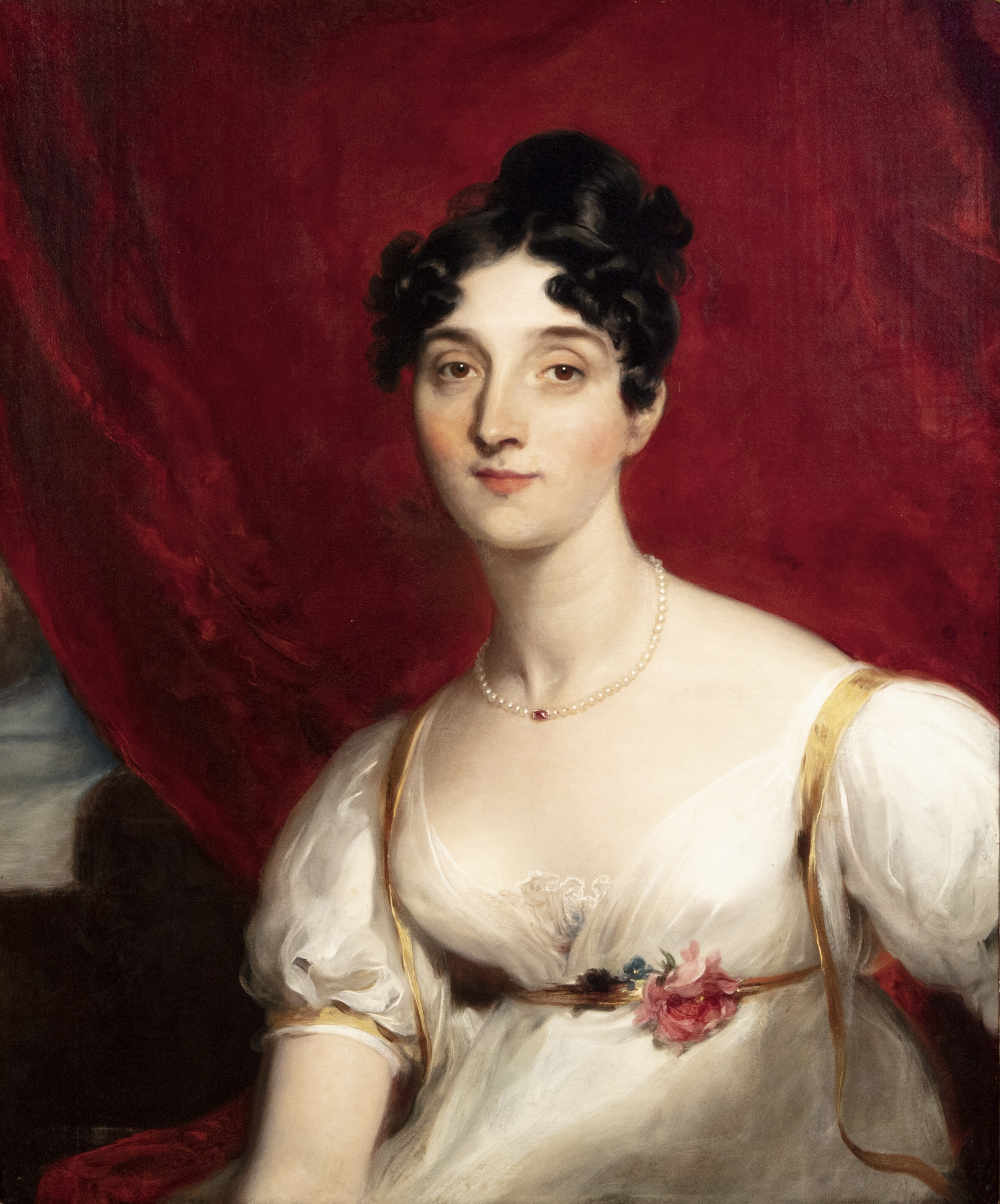
Portrait of Marianne Wellesley by Thomas Lawrence, c. 1817–1825

Following his first wife's death in 1816, he married, on 29 October 1825, the widowed Marianne (Caton) Patterson (died 1853), whose mother Mary was the daughter of Charles Carroll of Carrollton, the last surviving signatory of the United States Declaration of Independence; her former sister-in-law was Elizabeth Patterson Bonaparte. Wellington, who was very fond of Marianne (rumour had it that they were lovers) and was then on rather bad terms with his brother, pleaded with her not to marry him, warning her in particular that "The Parasites" would see her as an enemy. The Duke's concern seems to have been misplaced; they had no children, but the marriage was a relatively happy one - "much of the calm and sunshine of his old age can be attributed to Marianne".

== Later life ==
=== Lord Lieutenant of Ireland ===
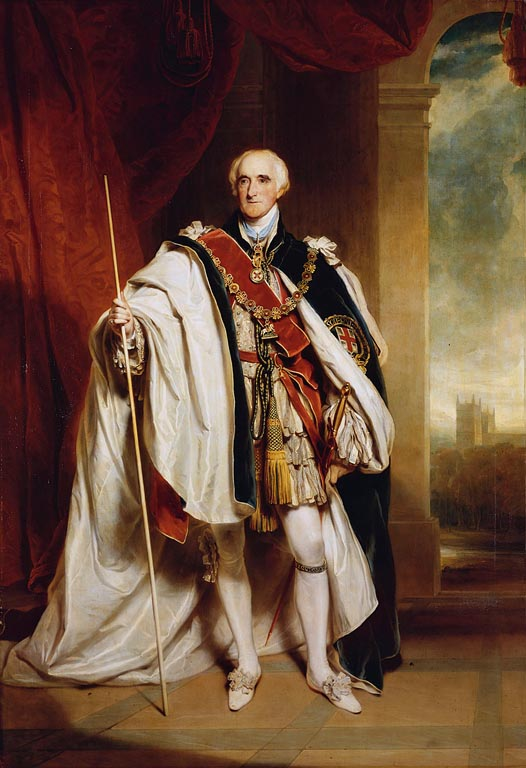
Lord Wellesley in Garter Robes, with the badge of the Grand Master of the Order of St Patrick around his neck and carrying the white staff of office as Lord Steward, presumably dressed for the coronation of William IV on 8 September 1831. Westminster Abbey in the background. Portrait by Sir Martin Archer Shee and exhibited at the Royal Academy in 1833

In 1821, he was appointed Lord Lieutenant of Ireland. Catholic emancipation had now become an open question in the cabinet, and Wellesley's acceptance of the viceroyalty was believed in Ireland to herald the immediate settlement of the Catholic claims but they would remain unfulfilled. Some efforts were made to placate Catholic opinion, notably the dismissal of the long-serving Attorney-General for Ireland, William Saurin, whose anti-Catholic views had made him bitterly unpopular. Lord Liverpool died without having grappled with the problem. His successor, Canning, died only a few months after taking up office as prime minister, to be succeeded briefly by Lord Goderich.

On the assumption of office by Wellington, his brother resigned the lord-lieutenancy. He is said to have been deeply hurt by his brother's failure to find a Cabinet position for him (Arthur made the usual excuse that one cannot give a Cabinet seat to everyone who wants one).

He had, however, the satisfaction of seeing the Catholic claims settled in the next year by the very statesmen who had declared against them. In 1833, he resumed the office of Lord Lieutenant under Earl Grey, but the ministry soon fell, and, with one short exception, Wellesley did not take any further part in official life.

=== Death ===
On his death, he had no successor in the marquessate, but the earldom of Mornington and minor honours devolved on his brother William, Lord Maryborough, on the failure of whose issue in 1863 they fell to Arthur Wellesley, 2nd Duke of Wellington.

He and Arthur, after a long estrangement, had been once more on friendly terms for some years: Arthur wept at the funeral and said that he knew of no honour greater than being Lord Wellesley's brother.

Wellesley was buried in Eton College Chapel, at his old school. Wellesley's library was sold at auction in London by R. H. Evans on 17 January 1843 (and three following days); a copy of the catalogue, annotated with prices and buyers' names, is held at Cambridge University Library (shelfmark Munby.c.149(1)).

== Legacy ==
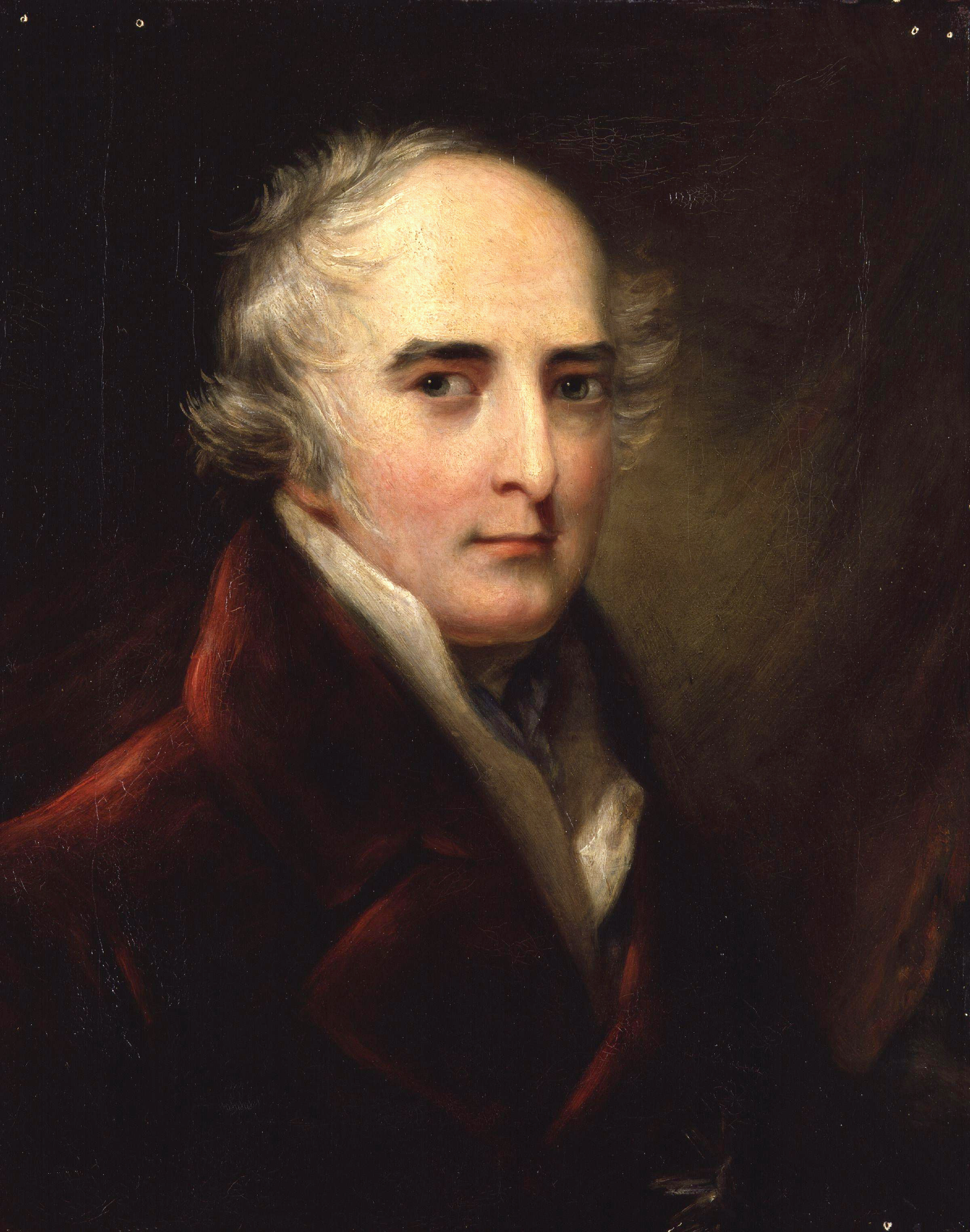
Marquess Wellesley by John Philip Davis ("Pope" Davis).

The Township of Wellesley, in Ontario, Canada, was named in Richard Wellesley's honour, despite the many references (e.g.: Waterloo, Wellington County) to his brother, Arthur Wellesley in the surrounding area, as was Wellesley Island, located in the St. Lawrence river at Alexandria Bay. Wellesley Island also serves as the last point exiting the United States before crossing to Hill Island, in Canada.

Province Wellesley, in the state of Penang, Malaysia, was named after Richard Wellesley. It was originally part of the state of Kedah. It was ceded to the British East India Company by Sultan Dziaddin Mukarram Shah II of Kedah in 1798, and has been part of the settlement and state of Penang ever since. It was renamed Seberang Perai ("across the Perai" in the Malay language) not long after independence within Malaya.

The Wellesley Islands off the north coast of Queensland, Australia, were named by Matthew Flinders in honour of Richard Wellesley, as was the largest island in the group, Mornington Island. Flinders is believed to have done this during his imprisonment by the French on Mauritius as Wellesley had tried to secure his release.

Mornington Peninsula, south of Melbourne, was named after him.

A street in Mirzapur (United Provinces) was named Wellesleyganj.

== Arms ==
Coat of arms of Richard Wellesley, 1st Marquess Wellesley
Crest 1st: Out of a Ducal Coronet Or a Demi Lion rampant Gules holding a Banner Purpure charged with an Estoile radiated wavy between eight Spots of the Royal Tiger in pairs saltirewise Or Staff Gold surmounted by a Pennon Argent charged with the Cross of St George, motto over in Hindustan characters; 2nd: A Cubit Arm erect vested Gules enfiled with a Ducal Coronet Or holding a Staff bendwise on the top thereof the Union Standard of Great Britain and Ireland and underneath the Mysore Standard all proper. Escutcheon Quarterly, 1st and 4th, Gules a Cross Argent between five Plates saltirewise in each quarter (Wellesley); 2nd and 3rd, Or a Lion rampant Gules ducally gorged of the field (Colley); and as an Honourable Augmentation, by Sign Manual in Dec 1790, an Inescutcheon Purpure charge with an Estoile radiated wavy between eight Spots of the Royal Tiger in pairs saltirewise Or, representing the Standard of the Sultan of Mysore. Supporters Dexter: a Lion Gules holding in the off-paw the Republican Flag of France inscribed "Republic of France" within a Wreath of Laurel the Staff broken all proper; Sinister: the Royal Tiger Guard Vert spotted Or supporting in the off-paw the Mysore Standard Staff also broken all proper, both supporters ducally crowned and chained Gold. Motto Above the second crest: Virtutis Fortuna Comes; Beneath the shield: Porro Unum Est Necessarium.

== Bibliography ==
- Butler, Iris. The Eldest Brother: the Marquess Wellesley 1760-1842. London: Hodder and Stoughton, 1973.
- Harrington, Jack (2010). Sir John Malcolm and the Creation of British India. New York: Palgrave Macmillan. ISBN 978-0-230-10885-1.
- Ingram, Edward, ed. Two Views of British India: The Private Correspondence of Mr. Dundas and Lord Wellesley, 1798–1801. Bath: Adams and Dart, 1970.
- Longford, Elizabeth (November 1972). Wellington: Pillar of state. Weidenfeld & Nicolson. ISBN 978-0-297-00250-5.
- Martin, Robert Montgomery, ed. The Despatches, Minutes & Correspondence of the Marquess Wellesley During His Administration in India. 5 vols. London: 1836–37.
- Pearce, Robert Rouiere. Memoirs and Correspondence of the Most Noble Richard Marquess Wellesley. 3 vols. London: 1846.
- Renick, M. S. Lord Wellesley and the Indian States. Agra: Arvind Vivek Prakashan, 1987.
- Roberts, P. E. India Under Wellesley. London: George Bell & Sons, 1929.
- Severn, John Kenneth (2007). Architects of empire : the Duke of Wellington and his brothers. Norman, OK: University of Oklahoma Press. ISBN 9780806138107.
- Torrens, William McCullagh. The Marquess Wellesley: Architect of Empire. London: Chatto and Windus, 1880.
- Wellesley, Richard Colley (1914). The Wellesley Papers: The Life and Correspondence of Richard Colley Wellesley (Hardcover). London: Herbert Jenkins.

Parliament of Ireland
Preceded by Thomas Fortescue; John Pomeroy	Member of Parliament for Trim; 1780–1781; With: John Pomeroy	Succeeded by William Arthur Crosbie; John Pomeroy
Parliament of Great Britain
Preceded by Viscount Feilding; Laurence Cox	Member of Parliament for Bere Alston; 1784–1787; With: Viscount Feilding	Succeeded by Viscount Feilding; Charles Rainsford
Preceded by Charles Jenkinson; Charles Ambler	Member of Parliament for Saltash; 1786–1787; With: Charles Ambler	Succeeded by Charles Ambler; John Lemon
Preceded by John Hussey-Montagu; Peniston Portlock Powney	Member of Parliament for Windsor; 1787–1796; With: Peniston Portlock Powney 1787–1794; William Grant 1794–1796	Succeeded by Robert Fulke Greville; Henry Isherwood
Preceded by George Hardinge; John Sullivan	Member of Parliament for Old Sarum; 1796–1797; With: George Hardinge	Succeeded by George Hardinge; Charles Williams-Wynn
Masonic offices
Preceded by The Earl of Antrim	Grandmaster of the Grand Lodge of Ireland; 1782–1783	Succeeded by The Lord Muskerry
Government offices
Preceded by Sir Alured Clarke, acting	Governor-General of India; 1798–1805	Succeeded by The Marquess Cornwallis
Political offices
Preceded by The Earl Bathurst	Foreign Secretary; 1809–1812	Succeeded by Viscount Castlereagh
Preceded by The Earl Talbot	Lord Lieutenant of Ireland; 1821–1828	Succeeded by The Marquess of Anglesey
Preceded by The Duke of Buckingham and Chandos	Lord Steward; 1830–1833	Succeeded by The Duke of Argyll
Preceded by The Marquess of Anglesey	Lord Lieutenant of Ireland; 1833–1834	Succeeded by The Earl of Haddington
Preceded by The Earl of Jersey	Lord Chamberlain; 1835	Succeeded by The Marquess Conyngham
Diplomatic posts
Preceded by John Hookham Frere	British Ambassador to Spain; 1808–1809	Succeeded by Henry Wellesley, 1st Baron Cowley
Peerage of Great Britain
New creation	Baron Wellesley; 1797–1842	Extinct
Peerage of Ireland
New creation	Marquess of Wellesley; 1799–1842	Extinct
Preceded by Garret Wesley	Earl of Mornington; 1781–1842	Succeeded by William Wellesley
