= Portrait of Hyacinthe Gabrielle Roland =

Painting by Élisabeth Vigée Le Brun

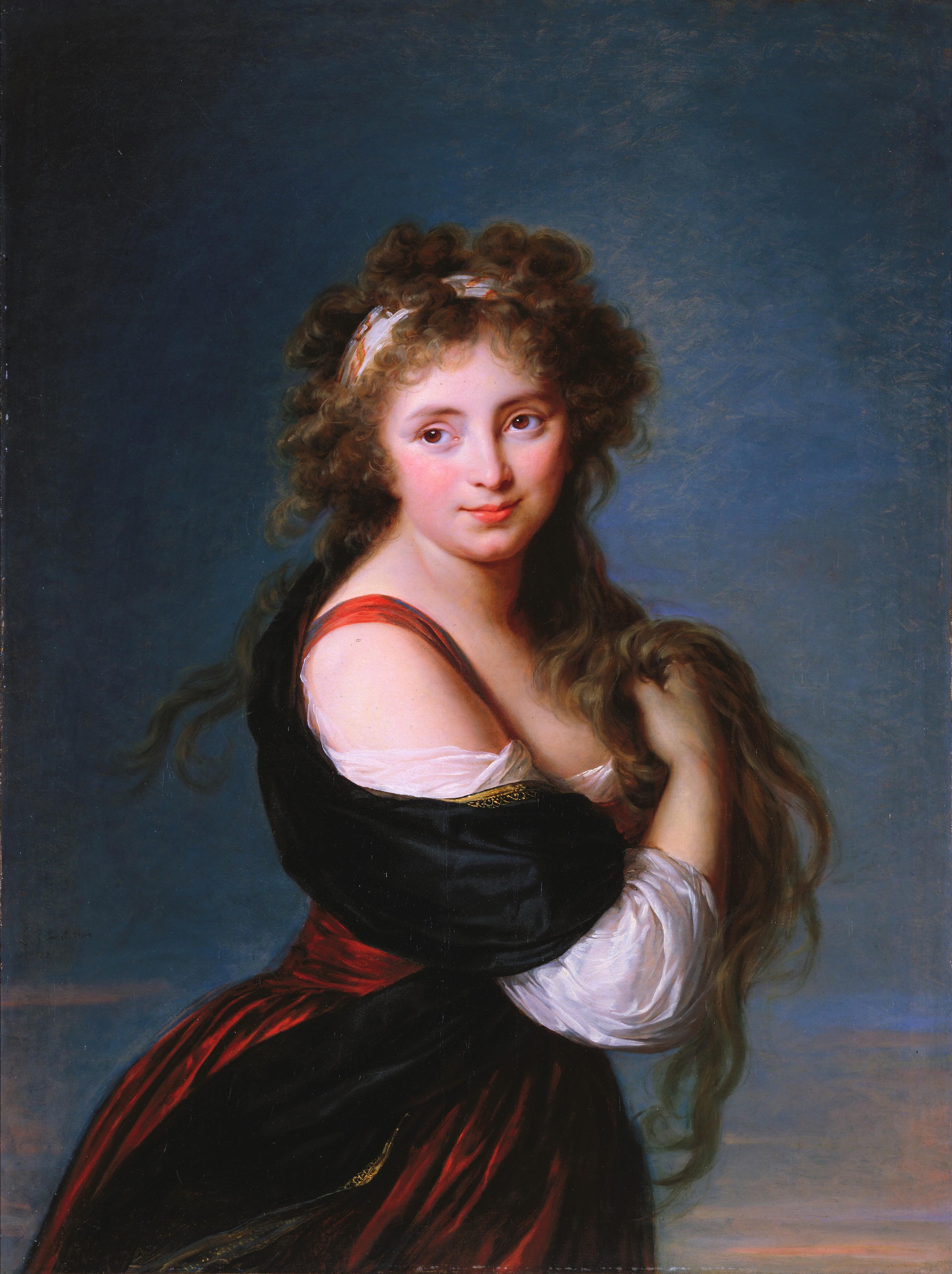
- Artist: Élisabeth Vigée Le Brun
- Year: 1791
- Type: Oil on canvas, portrait painting
- Dimensions: 99.1 cm × 74.9 cm (39.0 in × 29.5 in)
- Location: Fine Arts Museums of San Francisco, San Francisco

Portrait of Hyacinthe Gabrielle Roland is a 1791 portrait painting by the French artist Élisabeth Vigée Le Brun depicting the courtesan and actress Hyacinthe-Gabrielle Roland. At the time of the painting Roland was living with the Irish aristocrat and Tory politician Richard Wellesley. In 1794 the couple married and she first became Countess of Mornington and later Marchioness Wellesley in the Irish peerage, having previously had several children together.

Le Brun met and painted Roland in Rome, where she had recently settled following the French Revolution. Its composition echoes a portrait of Helena Fourment by Peter Paul Rubens. Today the painting is in the collection of the Fine Arts Museums of San Francisco in California, having been acquired in 1991.

== Bibliography ==
- Baillio, Joseph, Baetjer, Katharine & Lang, Paul. Vigée Le Brun. Metropolitan Museum of Art, 2016.
- Quinn, Bridget. Portrait of a Woman: Art, Rivalry, and Revolution in the Life of Adélaïde Labille-Guiard. Chronicle Books, 2024.
