= Henry Wellesley (1794–1866) =

British scholar

- Born: 1794; Park Lane, London
- Died: 1866 (aged 71–72); Oxford
- Occupations: Anglican cleric and university academic

The Rev. Lord Henry Wellesley was a British scholar, who held senior positions at Oxford University, and who is remembered for writing several books.

== Life ==
He was the fifth and last child of Richard Wellesley, 1st Marquess Wellesley and Hyacinthe-Gabrielle Roland. His parents married, but after all their children were born, so Wellesley's sons could not inherit his titles. He matriculated at Christ Church, Oxford in 1811, graduating B.A. in 1816 and M.A. in 1818. In 1816 he entered Lincoln's Inn.

Wellesley was Principal of Oxford University's New Inn Hall, curator of the Bodleian Library, curator of Ashmolean Museum and Taylor Institute.

Two of the books he is known for are Anthologica Polyglotta (1849) and Stray Notes of Shakespeare (1865).
