= Sir William Rae, 3rd Baronet =

Scottish politician and lawyer

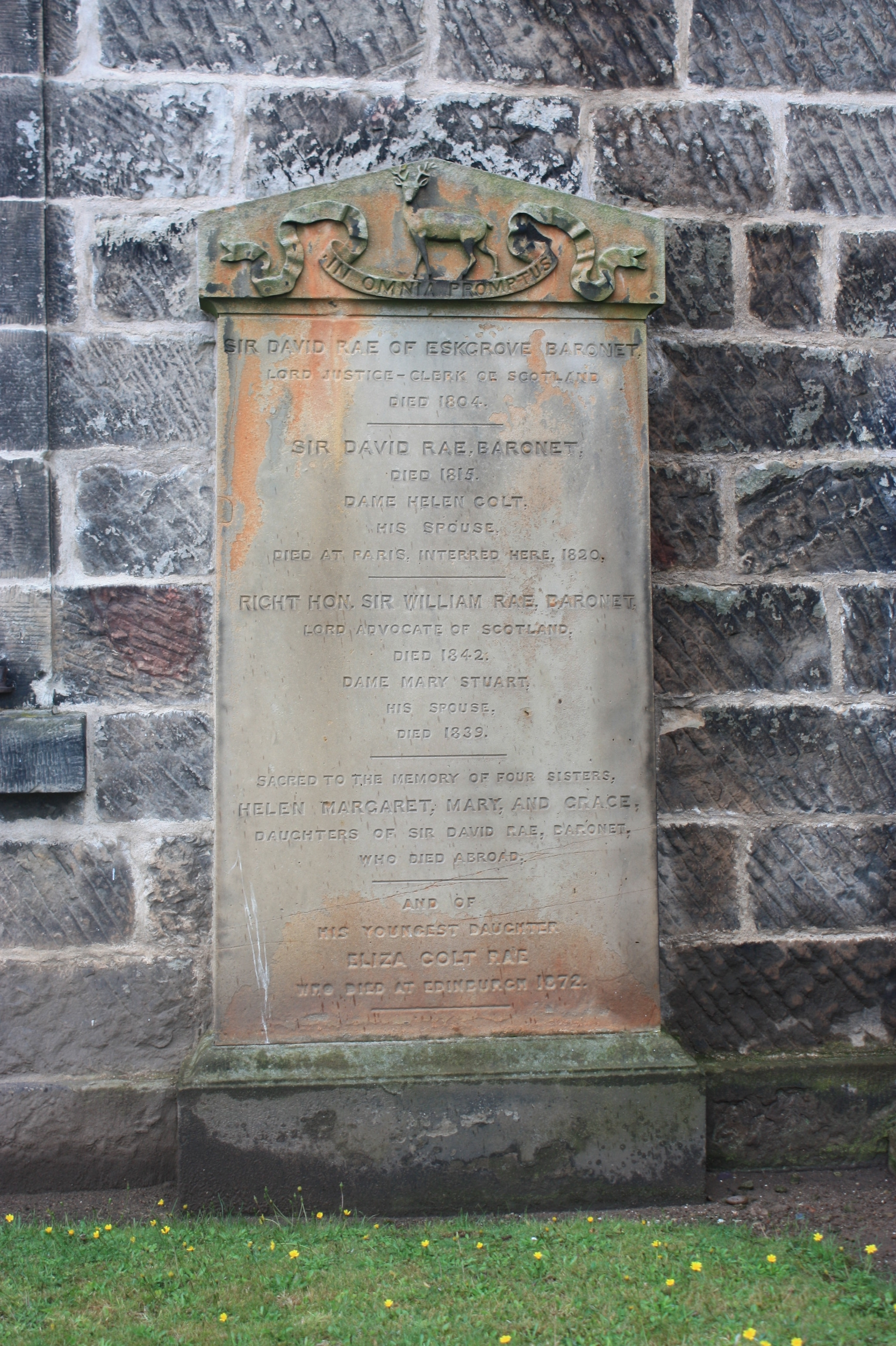
The Rae family grave, Inveresk

Sir William Rae, 3rd Baronet (14 April 1769 – 19 October 1842), was a Scottish politician and lawyer.

== Life ==
He was born at Old Assembly Close off the Royal Mile in Edinburgh, son of Margaret Stewart, youngest daughter of John Stewart of Blairhall and David Rae, Lord Eskgrove. He was educated at the High School in Edinburgh and studied law at the University of Edinburgh from 1785, qualifying as an advocate in 1791.

His first major role was as Sheriff of Orkney and Shetland in 1801, but in 1809 he transferred to an equivalent post as Sheriff of Edinburgh, which he held until 1819. He succeeded his father to the baronetcy in 1815.

He was Member of Parliament for Anstruther Burghs, in Fife, from 1819 to 1826, Harwich, Essex, England, from 1827 to 1830, Buteshire in 1830 and from 1833 to 1842, and for Portarlington, Queen's County, Ireland, from 1831 to 1832.

He served as Lord Advocate from 1819 to 1830 and from 1834 to 1835 and between September 1841 to October 1842. In the aftermath of the Peterloo Massacre, he reported to the Home Secretary, Viscount Sidmouth, on radical unrest in Scotland. He was made a Privy Councillor on 19 July 1830.

Grant's Old and New Edinburgh tells us that he was present at the Great Edinburgh Fire of 1824, actively trying to extinguish the flames of the building on the Royal Mile at the head of Old Assembly Close as it was "the house of his birth".

He died aged 73 at St Catherines, near Mortonhall in south Edinburgh on 18 October 1842.

He is buried with his father and mother on the south-west corner of St Michael's church in Inveresk. The stone is modest.

== Family ==
In 1793 he married Mary Stuart.

== Sources ==
- Lee, Sidney, ed. (1896). "Rae, William (1769-1842)" . Dictionary of National Biography. Vol. 47. London: Smith, Elder & Co.

Parliament of the United Kingdom
Preceded by Alexander Maconochie	Member for Anstruther Burghs; 1819–1826	Succeeded by James Balfour
Preceded by Nicholas Conyngham Tindal; John Charles Herries	Member for Harwich; 1827–1830; With: John Charles Herries	Succeeded by George Robert Dawson; John Charles Herries
Vacant alternating constituency (with Caithness) Title last held by Lord Patrick Crichton-Stuart to 1826	Member for Buteshire; 1830–1831	Vacant alternating constituency Title next held by Charles Stuart from 1832
Preceded by Sir Charles Ogle, Bt	Member for Portarlington; 1831–1832	Succeeded by Thomas Gladstone
Preceded by Charles Stuart	Member for Buteshire; 1833–1842	Succeeded by James Stuart-Wortley
Legal offices
Preceded by Alexander Maconochie	Lord Advocate; 1819–1830	Succeeded by Francis Jeffrey
Preceded by John Murray	Lord Advocate; 1834–1835	Succeeded by John Murray
Baronetage of the United Kingdom
Preceded by David Rae	Baronet (of Esk Grove); 1815–1842	Extinct
