= Richard Wellesley (1787–1831) =

Anglo-Irish politician

Richard Wellesley (22 April 1787 – 1 March 1831) was an Anglo-Irish Member of Parliament.

He was the illegitimate son of Richard Wellesley, 1st Marquess Wellesley and his mistress (later wife) Hyacinthe-Gabrielle Roland and educated at Eton College (1800), Christ Church, Oxford (1805), and Lincoln's Inn (1808).

He represented Queenborough in Parliament from 1810 to 1812, East Grinstead from January to March 1812, and Ennis from 1820 to 1826. He was appointed one of the Lords Commissioners of the Treasury from January to June 1812 and Commissioner of Stamp Duties from 1812 to his death.

He married in 1821, Jane Eliza, the daughter of George Chambers of Hartford, Huntingdonshire. They had 4 sons and a daughter.

His papers are held at the University of Southampton.

== Ancestors ==
Ancestors of Richard Wellesley (1787–1831)

16. Henry Colley
8. Richard Wesley, 1st Baron Mornington
17. Mary Usher
4. Garret Wesley, 1st Earl of Mornington
18. John Sale
9. Elizabeth Sale
19. Ellinor Desminières
2. Richard Wellesley, 1st Marquess Wellesley
20. Michael Hill
10. Arthur Hill-Trevor, 1st Viscount Dungannon
21. Anne Trevor
5. The Hon. Anne Hill-Trevor
22. Edmund Stafford
11. Anne Stafford
23. Penelope Leslie
1. Richard Wellesley
6. Pierre Roland
3. Hyacinthe-Gabrielle Roland
7. Hyacinthe-Gabrielle Varis

Parliament of the United Kingdom
Preceded by Joseph Hunt; John Villiers	Member of Parliament for Queenborough; 1810–1812; With: John Villiers	Succeeded by John Villiers; Robert Moorsom
Preceded by Nathaniel Dance-Holland; Charles Rose Ellis	Member of Parliament for East Grinstead; January 1812 – March 1812; With: Charles Rose Ellis	Succeeded by Charles Rose Ellis; George Gunning
Preceded by Sir Ross Mahon, Bt	Member of Parliament for Ennis; 1820–1826	Succeeded by Thomas Frankland Lewis
