= Sneyd Davies =

English poet, academic and churchman

Sneyd Davies (30 October 1709–20 January 1769) was an English poet, academic and churchman, archdeacon of Derby from 1755.

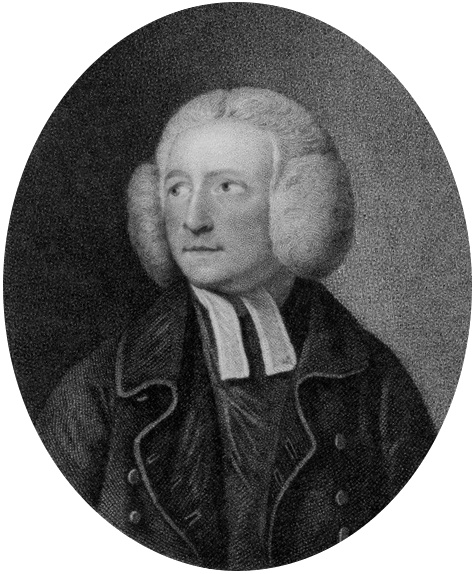
Sneyd Davies, 1817 engraving by Henry Hoppner Meyer.

== Life ==
He was born on 30 October 1709 at Shrewsbury, Shropshire, where, at St Mary's Church, he was baptised the next day. His father, John Davies, was rector of Kingsland, Herefordshire, and prebendary of Hereford and St Asaph Cathedrals. His mother, Honora, was daughter of Ralph Sneyd, and married, first, William Ravenscroft in 1690, who died in 1698, and secondly, John Davies, by whom she had four children, Sneyd being the second son. He was on the foundation at Eton College, and later became scholar and fellow of King's College, Cambridge. At Eton he made the acquaintance of Charles Pratt, who also became a Fellow of King's College, and of Frederick Cornwallis.

Davies wrote poems at school, and was noted for scholarship. His father died in 1732, and left him the advowson of Kingsland, where, once ordained priest by the Bishop of Ely in 1733, he assumed his father's position as rector. Here he settled, and led the life of a recluse, keeping up occasional correspondence with Pratt, Cornwallis, and other college friends. His particular crony was Timothy Thomas, rector of Presteigne, Radnorshire, in his neighbourhood, who joined him in translating the Essay on Man into Latin verse; he died, aged 59, in 1751.

Cornwallis, on becoming bishop of Lichfield in 1749, appointed Davies to a chaplaincy, and later appointed him master of St. John's Hospital in 1751, prebendary of Lichfield Cathedral, and in 1755 archdeacon of Derby. Davies became known in the literary circles of Lichfield; Anna Seward, then a girl, thought him a spirit "beatified before his time". Davies was interested in further preferment, but when Pratt as Lord Camden eventually offered him a small living in the neighbourhood of Kingsland in 1768, the health of Davies, who had a stroke in 1763, was breaking, and he died on 20 January 1769 aged 59.

Davies left the living of Kingsland and his whole fortune to Richard Evans; he was the nephew of his brother-in-law Henry Morgan of Henblas.

== Works ==
Davies's poems were not collected. They included Latin verses, imitations of Horace's epistles, serious and burlesque imitations of John Milton, and verses in the manner of Jonathan Swift. Some of them were published anonymously in two volumes of poems (1732 and 1745) by John Whaley, also a fellow of King's College. These and other poems by Davies are in James Dodsley's Collection (1775), and John Nichols's Collection (1780). Thomas Pennant's Tour in Wales contains a poem on Caractacus, delivered at an annual meeting on Caer Caradoc. One poem is in the fourth volume of William Duncombe's Imitations of Horace, which is dedicated to Davies. Others are in the life of Davies, by George Hardinge, in the first volume of Nichols's Illustrations of Literature.

Some letters, really written by James Davis and called Origines Divisianæ; or the Antiquities of the Devizes, in familiar letters to a friend (1754), have been attributed to Sneyd Davies.
