= Sir William Abdy, 7th Baronet =

English politician and baronet (1779–1868)

Sir William Abdy, 7th Baronet (1779 – 16 April 1868) was a British politician and baronet.

== Background ==
Born in Marylebone, he was the only son of Sir William Abdy, 6th Baronet, and his wife Mary Gordon, daughter of James Gordon. Abdy was educated at Eton College and Christ Church, Oxford, where he matriculated in 1796. In 1803, he succeeded his father as baronet.

== Career ==
He served in the British Army and was promoted to lieutenant of the South Essex Militia in 1798. Later he was second lieutenant of the Southwark Volunteers. In 1817, Abdy entered the British House of Commons as a Member of Parliament (MP) for Malmesbury until the following year.

Abdy co-owned three estates in Antigua and St Vincent, and when the British government emancipated the slaves in the 1830s, he was compensated to the tune of about £13,000 for the liberation of over 300 slaves.

== Family ==
On 3 July 1806, he married Anne Wellesley, eldest and illegitimate born, later legitimitated, daughter of Richard Wellesley, 1st Marquess Wellesley and Hyacinthe-Gabrielle Roland, at Hyde Park Corner. At some point during their marriage, she became lover of Lord Charles Bentinck and as result Abdy and his wife were divorced in 1816. He never remarried and died aged 89, without legitimate issue, at Hill Street, London. With his death the baronetcy became extinct.

Parliament of the United Kingdom
Preceded by William Hicks-Beach; Peter Patten	Member of Parliament for Malmesbury; 1817 – 1818; With: Peter Patten	Succeeded by Sir Charles Forbes; Kirkman Finlay
Baronetage of England
Preceded by William Abdy	Baronet (of Felix Hall); 1803 – 1868	Extinct
