= Baron Bolsover =

Extinct barony in the Peerage of the United Kingdom

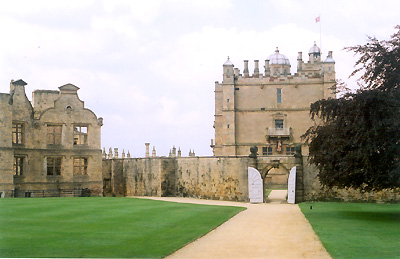
Bolsover Castle, Derbyshire

Baron Bolsover, of Bolsover Castle in the County of Derby, was a title in the Peerage of the United Kingdom. It was created on 23 April 1880 (as Baroness Bolsover) for Augusta Cavendish-Bentinck, with remainder to the heirs male of the body of her late husband Lieutenant-General Arthur Cavendish-Bentinck, younger son of Lord Charles Bentinck, third son of William Cavendish-Bentinck, 3rd Duke of Portland. Lady Bolsover was the daughter of the Very Reverend Henry Montague Browne, Dean of Lismore, second son of James Caulfeild Browne, 2nd Baron Kilmaine. She was succeeded according to the special remainder by her stepson William Cavendish-Bentinck, 6th Duke of Portland, who became the second Baron Bolsover. He was the only child from Arthur Cavendish-Bentinck's first marriage, to Elizabeth Sophia Hawkins-Whitshed.

The barony remained united with the dukedom until the death of the sixth Duke's son, the seventh Duke, in 1977. The dukedom was passed on to a cousin while the barony became extinct.

== Barons Bolsover (1880) ==
- Augusta Cavendish-Bentinck, 1st Baroness Bolsover (1834–1893)
- William John Arthur Charles James Cavendish-Bentinck, 2nd Baron Bolsover, 6th Duke of Portland (1857–1943)
- William Arthur Henry Cavendish-Bentinck, 3rd Baron Bolsover, 7th Duke of Portland (1893–1977)

== Arms ==
Coat of arms of Augusta, Baroness Bolsover
Coronet A coronet of a baroness Escutcheon Sable three lions passant in bend between four bendlets Argent. Supporters Dexter a lion doubled-queued Or gorged with a plain collar Sable holding in the mouth a slip of oak acorned Proper sinister a lion double-queued Sable gorged with a plain collar Or and holding in the mouth a like slip of oak.

== See also ==
- Lady Ottoline Morrell, daughter of the 1st Baroness and half-sister of the 2nd Baron
- Duke of Portland
- Baron Cavendish of Bolsover (held by the Dukes of Newcastle-upon-Tyne of the 1665 creation)
- Baron Kilmaine
