= George Hardinge =

English judge and writer (1743–1816)

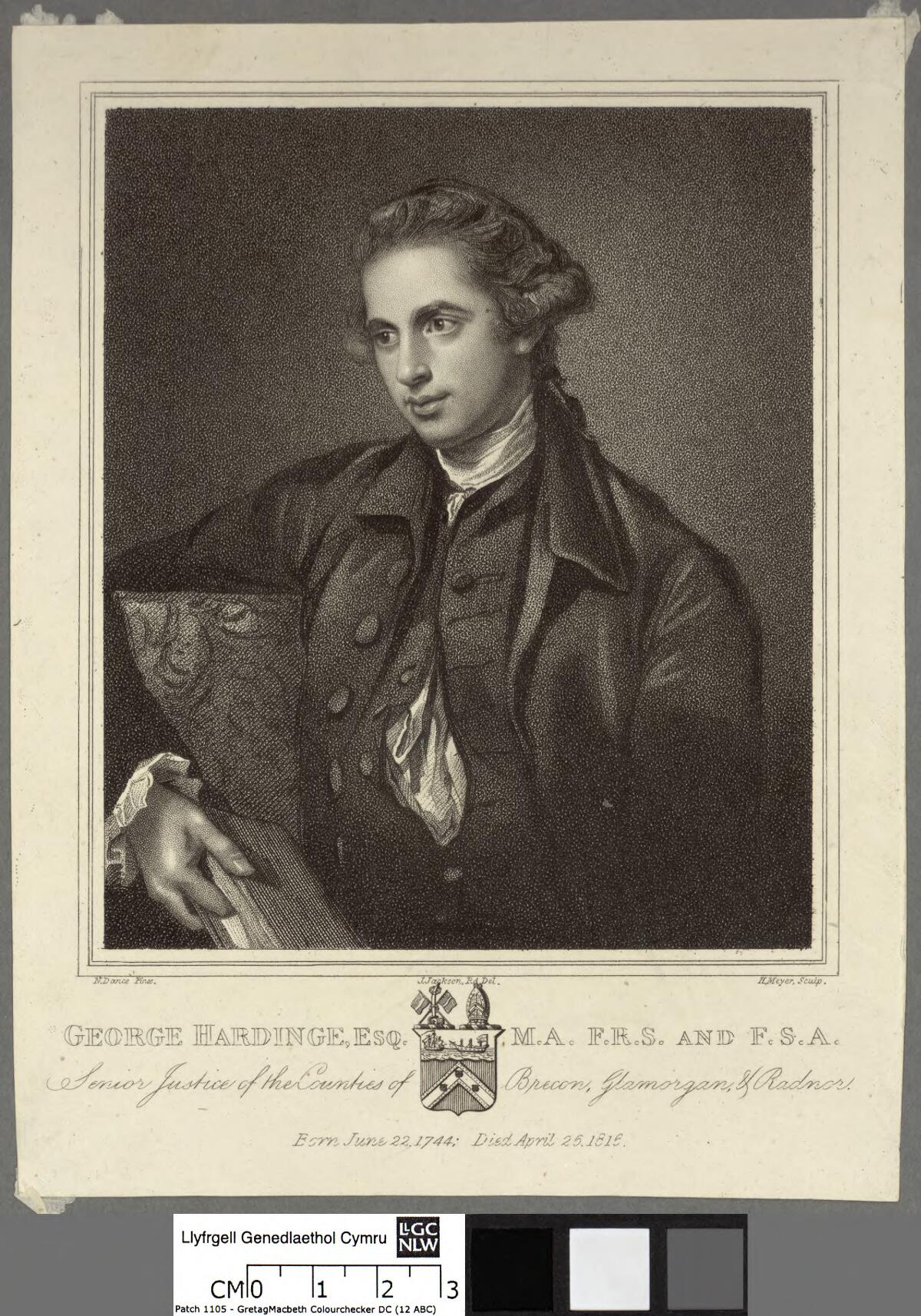
Portrait of George Haerdinge, Esq. M.A. F.R.S. and F.S.A (4672554)

George Hardinge (1743–1816) was an English judge, writer and Member of Parliament.

== Life ==
He was born on 22 June (new style) 1743 at Canbury, a manorhouse in Kingston upon Thames. He was the third but eldest surviving son of Nicholas Hardinge, by his wife Jane, daughter of Sir John Pratt. He was educated by Woodeson, a Kingston schoolmaster, and at Eton College under Edward Barnard.

Hardinge succeeded to his father's estate on the death of the latter on 9 April 1758. On 14 January 1761 he was admitted pensioner at Trinity College, Cambridge. He took no B.A. degree, but in 1769 obtained that of M.A. by royal mandate. On 9 June 1769 he was called to the bar (Middle Temple), and soon had considerable practice at nisi prius. One of his friends at this time was Mark Akenside the poet. In 1776 he visited France and Switzerland.

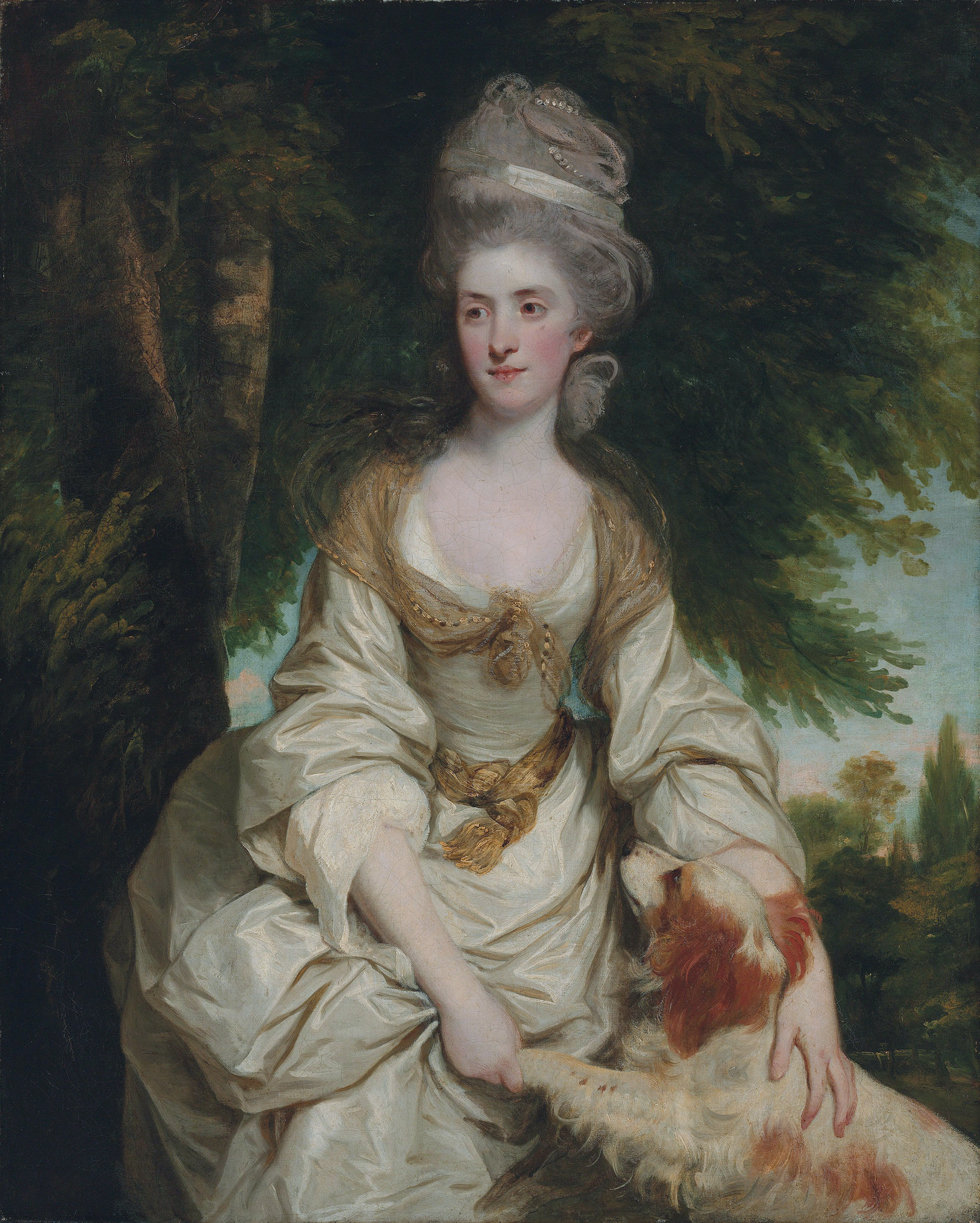
Lucy Long, Mrs George Hardinge (Joshua Reynolds, 1778)

On 20 October 1777 he married Lucy, daughter and heiress of Richard Long of Hinxton, Cambridgeshire, who survived her husband. They had no children, but Hardinge educated and adopted as his son and heir George Nicholas Hardinge, son of his brother, Henry Hardinge. Soon after his marriage Hardinge went to live at Ragman's Castle, a small house at Twickenham. Here he saw much of his neighbour, Horace Walpole, and later wrote about him. In April 1782 he was appointed solicitor-general to the Queen, and in March 1794 her attorney-general. In 1783 he was counsel in the House of Commons for the defence of Sir Thomas Rumbold, 1st Baronet, and on 16 December of that year was counsel at the bar of the House of Lords for the East India Company, in opposition to Charles James Fox's India Bill.

In 1784 he was returned M.P. for Old Sarum, by the favour of his intimate friend, Thomas Pitt, 1st Baron Camelford. He was re-chosen in November 1787, in 1790, 1796, and 1801. John Nichols says he was an eloquent and ingenious speaker. On 16 December 1788 he supported William Pitt the Younger's resolution declaring the right of the Houses to appoint a regent. On 5 April 1792 he pleaded at Warwick as counsel for the hundred in mitigation of the damages claimed by Joseph Priestley. In August 1787 he had been appointed senior justice of the Welsh counties of Breconshire, Glamorgan, and Radnorshire. He held the office until his death, which took place at Presteigne from pleurisy, on 26 April 1816.

Hardinge was 'the waggish Welsh judge, Jefferies Hardsman' of Lord Byron's Don Juan (xiii. stanza 88). It is stated that he collected more than £10,000 for charitable objects. He was vice-president and an early promoter of the Philanthropic Society. He was a fellow of the Society of Antiquaries (elected November 1769) and of the Royal Society (elected April 1788). Among his correspondents were Jacob Bryant, Horace Walpole and Anna Seward; Seward's letters to him are in her Letters (1811), vols. i. and ii.

== Works ==
Hardinge made biographical contributions to Nichols's Literary Anecdotes and Literary Illustrations, including memoirs of Daniel Wray and Sneyd Davies. He also edited some of his father's writings. In 1791 he published A Series of Letters to the Rt. Hon. E. Burke [as to] the Constitutional Existence of an Impeachment against Mr. Hastings, London; 3rd edit. same year. In 1800 he published two editions, The Essence of Malone, or the Beauties of that fascinating Writer extracted from his immortal work in 539 pages and a quarter, just published, and with his accustomed felicity intituled "Some Account of the Life and Writings of John Dryden." Another Essence of Malone followed in 1801. He was also the author of Rowley and Chatterton in the Shades, 1782 and of other writings, many of which are printed in his Miscellaneous Works, edited by his friend, John Nichols, 3 vols., London, 1818.

== Notes ==
Parliament of Great Britain
Preceded by Pinckney Wilkinson; Hon. John Villiers	Member of Parliament for Old Sarum; 1784–1800; With: Hon. John Villiers to 1790; John Sullivan 1790–96; The Earl of Mornington 1796–97; Charles Williams-Wynn 1797–99; Sir George Yonge from 1799	Succeeded by Parliament of the United Kingdom
Parliament of the United Kingdom
Preceded by Parliament of Great Britain	Member of Parliament for Old Sarum; 1801–1802; With: Sir George Yonge to 1801; John Horne Tooke 1801–02	Succeeded by Henry Alexander; Nicholas Vansittart
