= Richard Preston (MP) =

English legal author and politician

Richard Preston (1768–1850) was an English legal author and politician.

== Life ==
The only son of the Rev. John Preston of Okehampton in Devon, he was born at Ashburton in the same county in 1768, inheriting the family's notable Roman nose from his mother, Gunilda Preston. He began life as an attorney, but attracted the notice of Sir Francis Buller by his first work. On Buller's advice he entered the Inner Temple in 1793. After practising for some years as a certificated conveyancer, he was called to the bar on 20 May 1807, was elected a bencher in 1834, in which year he took silk, and was reader in 1844.

Preston represented Ashburton in the parliament of 1812–18, and was one of the early advocates of the Corn Laws. He had invested in land in Devon. In law, as in politics, he was intensely conservative, and thought the Fines and Recoveries Act a dangerous innovation.

Preston was for some time professor of law at King's College London. He died on 20 June 1850 at his seat, Lee House, Chulmleigh, in North Devon.

== Works ==
Preston was author of:

- An Elementary Treatise by way of Essay on the Quantity of Estates, Exeter, 1791.
- A Succinct View of the Rule in Shelley's Case, Exeter, 1794.
- A volume of Tracts (on cross-remainders, fines and recoveries, and related subjects), London, 1797.
- A Treatise on Conveyancing, London, 1806–9, 2 vols.; 2nd edit., 1813; 3rd edit., 1819–29.
- An Essay in a Course of Lectures on Abstracts of Title, London, 1818; 2nd edit. 1823–4.

His political views are in Address to the Fundholder, the Manufacturer, the Mechanic, and the Poor on the subject of the Corn Laws, London, 1815; and other tracts in The Pamphleteer, vols. vii.–xi., London, 1816–18.

Preston also edited in 1828 William Sheppard's Touchstone of Common Assurances, London.

== Notable Relatives ==
Preston's grandson, John Burgess Karslake, was a Member of Parliament from 1867-68 and 1873-76, Solicitor General in 1866, and Attorney General from 1867-86 and in 1874.

== Notes ==
Attribution

This article incorporates text from a publication now in the public domain: Lee, Sidney, ed. (1896). "Preston, Richard". Dictionary of National Biography. Vol. 46. London: Smith, Elder & Co.
