= List of cabinets of Greece =

This is a list of the government cabinets of Greece.

Greece officially adopted the Gregorian calendar on 16 February 1923 (which became 1 March). All dates prior to that are Old Style.

== Third Hellenic Republic, 1974–present ==
Cabinet	Tenure	Prime Minister	Parties
Second Cabinet of Kyriakos Mitsotakis	27 June 2023 -	Kyriakos Mitsotakis	New Democracy
Caretaker Cabinet of Ioannis Sarmas	26 May 2023 – 25 June 2023	Ioannis Sarmas	Non-party caretaker government to hold June 2023 Greek legislative election
First Cabinet of Kyriakos Mitsotakis	9 July 2019 – 25 May 2023	Kyriakos Mitsotakis	New Democracy
Second Cabinet of Alexis Tsipras	23 September 2015 – 8 July 2019	Alexis Tsipras	SYRIZA, Independent Greeks
Caretaker Cabinet of Vassiliki Thanou-Christophilou	28 August 2015 – 23 September 2015	Vassiliki Thanou	Non-party caretaker government to hold September 2015 Greek legislative election
First Cabinet of Alexis Tsipras	27 January 2015 – 28 August 2015	Alexis Tsipras	SYRIZA; Independent Greeks; Ecologist Greens
Cabinet of Antonis Samaras	21 June 2012 – 26 January 2015	Antonis Samaras	New Democracy; Panhellenic Socialist Movement; Democratic Left (until 25 June 2013); Agreement for the New Greece (from 9 June 2014)
Caretaker Cabinet of Panagiotis Pikrammenos	17 May 2012 - 20 June 2012	Panagiotis Pikrammenos	Non-party caretaker government to hold June 2012 Greek legislative election
Coalition Cabinet of Lucas Papademos	11 November 2011 – 17 May 2012	Lucas Papademos	Panhellenic Socialist Movement; New Democracy; Popular Orthodox Rally
Cabinet of George Papandreou (junior)	7 October 2009 – 11 November 2011	George Papandreou (junior)	Panhellenic Socialist Movement
Second Cabinet of Kostas Karamanlis	19 September 2007 – 7 October 2009	Kostas Karamanlis	New Democracy
First Cabinet of Kostas Karamanlis	10 March 2004 – 19 September 2007	Kostas Karamanlis	New Democracy
Third Cabinet of Costas Simitis	13 April 2000 – 10 March 2004	Costas Simitis	Panhellenic Socialist Movement
Second Cabinet of Costas Simitis	25 September 1996 – 13 April 2000	Costas Simitis	Panhellenic Socialist Movement
First Cabinet of Costas Simitis	22 January 1996 – 25 September 1996	Costas Simitis	Panhellenic Socialist Movement
Third Cabinet of Andreas Papandreou	13 October 1993 – 25 January 1996	Andreas Papandreou	Panhellenic Socialist Movement
Cabinet of Konstantinos Mitsotakis	11 April 1990 – 13 October 1993	Konstantinos Mitsotakis	New Democracy
Ecumenical Cabinet of Xenophon Zolotas	23 November 1989 – 11 April 1990	Xenophon Zolotas	New Democracy; Panhellenic Socialist Movement; Synaspismos
Caretaker Cabinet of Ioannis Grivas	12 October 1989 – 23 November 1989	Ioannis Grivas	Non-party caretaker government to hold November 1989 Greek legislative election
Cabinet of Tzannis Tzannetakis	2 July 1989 – 12 October 1989	Tzannis Tzannetakis	New Democracy, Synaspismos
Second Cabinet of Andreas Papandreou	5 June 1985 – 2 July 1989	Andreas Papandreou	Panhellenic Socialist Movement
First Cabinet of Andreas Papandreou	21 October 1981 – 5 June 1985	Andreas Papandreou	Panhellenic Socialist Movement
Cabinet of Georgios Rallis	10 May 1980 – 21 October 1981	George Rallis	New Democracy
Seventh Cabinet of Konstantinos Karamanlis	28 November 1977 – 10 May 1980	Konstantinos Karamanlis	New Democracy
sixth Cabinet of Konstantinos Karamanlis	21 November 1974 – 28 November 1977	Konstantinos Karamanlis	New Democracy
National Unity Cabinet of Konstantinos Karamanlis	24 July 1974 – 21 November 1974	Konstantinos Karamanlis	National Radical Union (until 4 October 1974); New Democracy (from 4 October 1974); Centre Union (until 7 October 1974); Centre Union – New Forces (from 7 October 1974)

== Greek junta, 1967–1974 ==
Cabinet	Tenure	Prime Minister	Parties
Cabinet of Adamantios Androutsopoulos	25 November 1974 - 24 July 1974	Adamantios Androutsopoulos	appointed by the junta regime
Cabinet of Spyros Markezinis	8 October 1973 - 25 November 1974	Spyros Markezinis	appointed by the junta regime
Cabinet of Georgios Papadopoulos	18 December 1967 - 8 October 1973	Georgios Papadopoulos	leader of the Greek junta
Cabinet of Konstantinos Kollias	21 April 1967 - 13 December 1967	Konstantinos Kollias	appointed by the junta regime

== Kingdom of Greece (Second Crowned Republic (1935–1967) ==
Cabinet	Tenure	Prime Minister	Parties
Cabinet of Ioannis Paraskevopoulos	22 December 1967 - 3 April 1967	Ioannis Paraskevopoulos	non party caretaker government
Cabinet of Stefanos Stefanopoulos	17 September 1965 - 22 December 1967	Stefanos Stefanopoulos	appointed by the King Constantine II of Greece from defectors of the Center Union
Cabinet of Ilias Tsirimokos	20 August 1965 - 17 September 1965	Ilias Tsirimokos	appointed by the King Constantine II of Greece from defectors of the Center Union
Cabinet of Georgios Athanasiadis-Novas	15 July 1965 - 20 August 1965	Georgios Athanasiadis-Novas	appointed by the King Constantine II from defectors of the Center Union
Fifth Cabinet of Georgios Papandreou	19 February 1964 - 15 July 1965	Georgios Papandreou	Center Union
Cabinet of Ioannis Paraskevopoulos	16 December 1963 - 18 February 1964	Ioannis Paraskevopoulos	caretaker government to hold 1964 Greek legislative election
Fourth Cabinet of Georgios Papandreou	0 November 1963 - 31 December 1963	Georgios Papandreou	coalition cabinet under Center Union leadership
Cabinet of Stylianos Mavromichalis	28 September 1963 - 8 November 1963	Stylianos Mavromichalis	caretaker government to hold 1963 Greek legislative election
Cabinet of Panagiotis Pipinelis	19 June 1963 - 28 September 1963	Panagiotis Pipinelis	non-party government, appointed by King Paul of Greece
Fourth Cabinet of Konstantinos Karamanlis	4 November 1961 - 19 July 1963	Konstantinos Karamanlis	National Radical Union
Cabinet of Konstantinos Dovas	20 September 1961 - 4 November 1961	Konstantinos Dovas	caretaker government to hold 1961 Greek legislative election
Third Cabinet of Konstantinos Karamanlis	17 May 1958 - 20 September 1961	Konstantinos Karamanlis	National Radical Union
Cabinet of Konstantinos Georgakopoulos	5 March - 17 May 1958	Konstantinos Georgakopoulos	caretaker government to hold 1958 Greek legislative election
Second Cabinet of Konstantinos Karamanlis	29 February 1956 - 5 March 1958	Konstantinos Karamanlis	National Radical Union
First Cabinet of Konstantinos Karamanlis	6 October 1955 - 29 February 1056	Konstantinos Karamanlis	appointed by the King Paul of Greece / vote of confidence by Parliament
Cabinet of Alexander Papagos	19 November 1952 - 6 October 1955	Alexander Papagos	Greek Rally
Cabinet of Dimitrios Kiousopoulos	11 October - 19 November 1952	Dimitrios Kiousopoulos	caretaker government to hold 1952 Greek legislative election
Third Cabinet of Nikolaos Plastiras	27 October 1951 - 11 October 1952	Nikolaos Plastiras	National Progressive Center Union; Liberal Party (Greece)
Fifth Cabinet of Sophoklis Venizelos	3 November 1950 - 27 October 1951	Sophoklis Venizelos	Liberal Party (Greece); Democratic Socialist Party of Greece
Fourth Cabinet of Sophoklis Venizelos	13 September - 3 November 1950	Sophoklis Venizelos	Liberal Party; People's Party (Greece); Georgios Papandreou Party
Third Cabinet of Sophoklis Venizelos	21 August - 13 September 1950	Sophoklis Venizelos	Liberal Party; Georgios Papandreou Party; National Party of Greece
Second Cabinet of Nikolaos Plastiras	15 April - 21 August 1950	Nikolaos Plastiras	National Progressive Center Union; Liberal Party; Georgios Papandreou Party
Second Cabinet of Sophoklis Venizelos	23 March - 15 April 1950	Sophoklis Venizelos	Liberal Party; National Unionist Party
Cabinet of Ioannis Theotokis	6 January - 23 March 1950	Ioannis Theotokis	caretaker government to hold 1950 Greek legislative election
Cabinet of Alexandros Diomidis	30 June 1949 - 6 January 1950	Alexandros Diomidis	People's Party (Greece); Liberal Party; National Unionist Party appointed by King Paul of Greece due to unexpected death of the Prime Minister
Sixth Cabinet of Themistoklis Sofoulis	14 April - 30 June 1949	Themistoklis Sofoulis	Liberal Party; People's Party; National Unionist Party
Fifth Cabinet of Themistoklis Sofoulis	20 January - 14 April 1949	Themistoklis Sofoulis	Liberal Party; People's Party; National Unionist Party; New Party
Fourth Cabinet of Themistoklis Sofoulis	18 November 1949 - 20 January 1950	Themistoklis Sofoulis	Liberal Party; People's Party
Third Cabinet of Themistoklis Sofoulis	7 September 1947 - 18 November 1948	Themistoklis Sofoulis	Liberal Party; People's Party
Third Cabinet of Konstantinos Tsaldaris	29 August - 7 September 1947	Konstantinos Tsaldaris	People's Party; National Party of Greece
Cabinet of Dimitrios Maximos	24 January - 29 August 1947	Dimitrios Maximos	United Alignment of Nationalists; National Political Union (1946); National Party of Greece; Union of Nationalists; Union of Agrarian Parties
Second Cabinet of Konstantinos Tsaldaris	2 October 1946 - 24 January 1947	Konstantinos Tsaldaris	United Alignment of Nationalists
First Cabinet of Konstantinos Tsaldaris	18 April - 2 October 1946	Konstantinos Tsaldaris	United Alignment of Nationalists
Cabinet of Panagiotis Poulitsas	4 - 18 April 1946	Panagiotis Poulitsas	People's Party; National Political Union (1946)
Second Cabinet of Themistoklis Sofoulis	22 November 1945 - 4 April 1946	Themistoklis Sofoulis	appointed by regent of Greece, Damaskinos of Athens
Cabinet of Panagiotis Kanellopoulos (1945)	1–22 November 1945	Panagiotis Kanellopoulos	appointed by regent of Greece, Damaskinos of Athens
Cabinet of Archbishop Damaskinos	17 October - 1 November 1945	Archbishop Damaskinos	provisional government
Second Cabinet of Petros Voulgaris	11 August - 17 October 1945	Petros Voulgaris	extension of the term of office of the previous government
First Cabinet of Petros Voulgaris	8 April - 11 August 1945	Petros Voulgaris	caretaker government to hold constitutional referendum
First Cabinet of Nikolaos Plastiras	3 January - 8 April 1945	Nikolaos Plastiras	appointed by Regent of Greece, Damaskinos of Athens
Third Cabinet of Georgios Papandreou (II National Unity)	18 October 1944 - 3 January 1945	Georgios Papandreou	National unity government

=== Axis occupation of Greece (1941 - 1944) (parallel administrations) ===
==== Hellenic State ====
Cabinet	Tenure	Prime Minister	Parties
Cabinet of Ioannis Rallis	7 April 1943 - 12 October 1944	Ioannis Rallis	puppet government /no parties
Cabinet of Konstantinos Logothetopoulos	2 December 1942 - 7 April 1943	Konstantinos Logothetopoulos	puppet government /no parties
Cabinet of Georgios Tsolakoglou	30 April 1941 - 2 December 1942	Georgios Tsolakoglou	puppet government /no parties

==== Greek government-in-exile ====
Cabinet	Tenure	Prime Minister	Parties
Second Cabinet of Georgios Papandreou (I National Unity)	24 May - 18 October 1944	Georgios Papandreou	National unity government
First Cabinet of Georgios Papandreou	26 April - 22 May 1944	Georgios Papandreou	appointed by the George II of Greece
First Cabinet of Sophoklis Venizelos	14 April - 26 April 1944	Sophoklis Venizelos	appointed by the King
Cabinet of Emmanouil Tsouderos	21 April 1941 - 14 April 1944	Emmanouil Tsouderos	appointed by the King

==== Political Committee of National Liberation ====
Cabinet	Tenure	Prime Minister	Parties
Interim cabinet of Evripidis Bakirtzis	10 March - 18 April 1944	Evripidis Bakirtzis	Communist Party of Greece; Union of People's Democracy; Agrarian Party
Cabinet of Alexandros Svolos	18 April- 2 September 1944	Alexandros Svolos	Communist Party of Greece; Union of People's Democracy; Agrarian Party

=== 4th of August Regime ===
Cabinet	Tenure	Prime Minister	Parties
Cabinet of Alexandros Koryzis	29 January - 18 April 1941	Alexandros Koryzis	appointed by the King /no parties
Cabinet of Ioannis Metaxas	13 April 1936 - 29 January 1941	Ioannis Metaxas	appointed by the King /no parties

=== Restoration of Monarchy ===
Cabinet	Tenure	Prime Minister	Parties
Cabinet of Konstantinos Demertzis	30 November 1935 - 13 April 1936	Konstantinos Demertzis	caretaker cabinet
Second Cabinet of Georgios Kondylis	10 October = 30 November 1935	Georgios Kondylis	appointed by Fifth National Assembly at Athens

== Second Hellenic Republic ==
Cabinet	Tenure	Prime Minister	Parties
Second Cabinet of Panagis Tsaldaris	10 March 1933 - 10 October 1935	Panagis Tsaldaris	People's Party; National Democratic Party; Freethinkers' Party
Cabinet of Alexandros Othonaios	6 March - 10 March 1933	Alexandros Othonaios	interim military government appointed by President of Greece
Ninth Cabinet of Eleftherios Venizelos	16 January - 6 March 1933	Eleftherios Venizelos	Liberal Party; Agricultural and Labour Party; Progressive Party; Conservative Democratic Party
First Cabinet of Panagis Tsaldaris	4 November 1932 - 16 January 1933	Panagis Tsaldaris	People's Party; Freethinkers' Party; National Democratic Party
Eighth Cabinet of Eleftherios Venizelos	5 June - 4 November 1932	Eleftherios Venizelos	Liberal Party
Second Cabinet of Alexandros Papanastasiou	26 May - 5 June 1932	Alexandros Papanastasiou	Agricultural and Labour Party with the parliamentary support of the Liberal Party
Seventh Cabinet of Eleftherios Venizelos	16 December 1929 - 26 May 1932	Eleftherios Venizelos	Liberal Party
Sixth Cabinet of Eleftherios Venizelos	7 June - 16 December 1929	Eleftherios Venizelos	Liberal Party
Fifth cabinet of Eleftherios Venizelos	4 July 1928 - 7 June 1929	Eleftherios Venizelos	Liberal Party
Eighth Cabinet of Alexandros Zaimis	8 February - 4 July 1928	Alexandros Zaimis	Liberal Party; Freethinkers' Party; Progressive Party
Seventh Cabinet of Alexandros Zaimis	17 August 1927 - 8 February 1928	Alexandros Zaimis	Liberal Party; Freethinkers' Party; Democratic Union
Sixth Cabinet of Alexandros Zaimis	4 December 1926 - 17 August 1927	Alexandros Zaimis	Liberal Party; People's Party; Freethinkers' Party; Democratic Union
First Cabinet of Georgios Kondylis	26 August - 4 December 1926	Georgios Kondylis	appointed by Pavlos Kountouriotis, President of Hellenic Republic
Cabinet of Athanasios Eftaxias	19 July - 23 August 1926	Athanasios Eftaxias	appointed by Theodoros Pangalos President of Hellenic Republic after 1925 Greek coup d'état
Cabinet of Theodoros Pangalos	26 June 1925 - 19 July 1926	Theodoros Pangalos	1925 Greek coup d'état / appointed by Pavlos Kountouriotis, President of Hellenic Republic
Cabinet of Andreas Michalakopoulos	7 October 1924 - 26 June 1925	Andreas Michalakopoulos	Conservative Democratic Party; National Democratic Party
First Cabinet of Themistoklis Sofoulis	24 July - 7 October 1924	Themistoklis Sofoulis	Liberal Party
First Cabinet of Alexandros Papanastasiou	12 March - 24 July 1924	Alexandros Papanastasiou	Democratic Union

== Kingdom of Greece - First Crowned Republic (1863-1924) ==
Cabinet	Tenure	Prime Minister	Parties
Cabinet of Georgios Kafantaris	6 February - 12 March 1924	Georgios Kafantaris	Liberal party
Fourth Cabinet of Eleftherios Venizelos	11 January - 6 February 1924	Eleftherios Venizelos	Liberal party
Cabinet of Stylianos Gonatas	14 November 1922 - 11 January 1924	Stylianos Gonatas	appointed by the "Revolutionary Committee" of 1922 Greek coup
Cabinet of Sotirios Krokidas	17 September - 14 November 1922	Sotirios Krokidas	appointed by the "Revolutionary Committee" of 1922 Greek coup
Cabinet of Anastasios Charalambis	16 - 17 September 1922	Anastasios Charalambis	appointed by the "Revolutionary Committee" of 1922 Greek coup
Cabinet of Nikolaos Triantaphyllakos	28 August - 16 September 1922	Nikolaos Triantaphyllakos	United Opposition (Greece)
Cabinet of Petros Protopapadakis	9 May - 26 August 1922	Petros Protopapadakis	United Opposition (Greece)
Cabinet of Nikolaos Stratos	3 - 9 May 1922	Nikolaos Stratos	United Opposition
Third Cabinet of Dimitrios Gounaris	2 March - 3 May 1922	Dimitrios Gounaris	United Opposition
Second Cabinet of Dimitrios Gounaris	26 March 1921 - 2 March 1922	Dimitrios Gounaris	United Opposition
Second Cabinet of Nikolaos Kalogeropoulos	24 January - 26 March 1921	Nikolaos Kalogeropoulos	United Opposition
Fifth Cabinet of Dimitrios Rallis	4 November 1920 - 24 January 1921	Dimitrios Rallis	United Opposition
Third Cabinet of Eleftherios Venizelos	14 June 1917 - 4 November 1920	Eleftherios Venizelos	appointed by Triple Entente (National Schism)
Fifth Cabinet of Alexandros Zaimis	21 April - 21 June 1917	Alexandros Zaimis	appointed by the King Constantine I of Greece
Provisional Government of National Defence	26 December 1916 - 14 June 1917	Eleftherios Venizelos	parallel administration due to the National Schism
Cabinet of Spyridon Lambros	27 September 1916 - 21 April 1917	Spyridon Lambros	Non-party caretaker government appointed by the King Constantine I of Greece
First Cabinet of Nikolaos Kalogeropoulos	3 - 27 September 1916	Nikolaos Kalogeropoulos	appointed by the King Constantine I of Greece (Crown Council of Greece)
Fourth Cabinet of Alexandros Zaimis	9 June - 3 September 1916	Alexandros Zaimis	appointed by the King (Crown Council of Greece)
Cabinet of Stephanos Skouloudis	25 October 1915 - 9 June 1916	Stephanos Skouloudis	Nationally-minded Party
Third Cabinet of Alexandros Zaimis	24 September - 25 October 1915	Alexandros Zaimis	appointed by the King Constantine I
Second Cabinet of Eleftherios Venizelos	10 August - 24 September 1915	Eleftherios Venizelos	Liberal Party
First Cabinet of Dimitrios Gounaris	25 February - 10 August 1915	Dimitrios Gounaris	appointed by the King
First Cabinet of Eleftherios Venizelos	6 October 1910 - 25 February 1915	Eleftherios Venizelos	Liberal Party
Cabinet of Stephanos Dragoumis	18 January - 6 October 1910	Stephanos Dragoumis	appointed by the King George I of Greece (Crown Council of Greece)
Cabinet of Kyriakoulis Mavromichalis	15 August 1909 - 18 January 1910	Kyriakoulis Mavromichalis	appointed by the King George I of Greece / National Party
Fourth Cabinet of Dimitrios Rallis	7 July - 15 August 1909	Dimitrios Rallis	Neohellenic Party
Fourth Cabinet of Georgios Theotokis	8 December 1905 - 7 July 1909	Georgios Theotokis	New Party
Third Cabinet of Dimitrios Rallis	9 June - 8 December 1905	Dimitrios Rallis	Working majority government
Fifth Cabinet of Theodoros Deligiannis	17 December 1904 - 9 June 1905	Theodoros Deligiannis	National Party (Greece)
Third Cabinet of Georgios Theotokis	6 December 1903 - 17 December 1904	Georgios Theotokis	New Party
Second Cabinet of Dimitrios Rallis	28 June - 6 December 1903	Dimitrios Rallis	Minority government
Second Cabinet of Georgios Theotokis	14 - 28 June 1903	Georgios Theotokis	Majority government
Fourth Cabinet of Theodoros Deligiannis	24 November 1902 - 14 June 1903	Theodoros Deligiannis	National Party; Neohellenic Party
Second Cabinet of Alexandros Zaimis	12 November 1901 - 18 November 1902	Alexandros Zaimis	appointed by the King George I of Greece
First Cabinet of Georgios Theotokis	2 April 1899 - 12 November 1901	Georgios Theotokis	Modernist Party
First Cabinet of Alexandros Zaimis	21 September 1897 - 2 April 1899	Alexandros Zaimis	appointed by the King
First Cabinet of Dimitrios Rallis	18 April - 21 September 1897	Dimitrios Rallis	appointed by the King
Third Cabinet of Theodoros Deligiannis	31 May 1895 - 18 April 1897	Theodoros Deligiannis	National Party
Cabinet of Nikolaos Deligiannis	12 January - 31 May 1895	Nikolaos Deligiannis	Non-party caretaker government to hold 1895 Greek legislative election
Seventh Cabinet of Charilaos Trikoupis	30 October 1893 - 12 January 1895	Charilaos Trikoupis	Modernist Party
Cabinet of Sotirios Sotiropoulos	3 May - 30 October 1893	Sotirios Sotiropoulos	minority government appointed by King
Sixth Cabinet of Charilaos Trikoupis	10 June 1892 - 3 May 1893	Charilaos Trikoupis	Modernist Party
Cabinet of Konstantinos Konstantopoulos	10 February - 10 June 1892	Konstantinos Konstantopoulos	minority government appointed by King George I of Greece
Second Cabinet of Theodoros Deligiannis	24 October 1890 - 18 February 1892	Theodoros Deligiannis	National Party
Fifth Cabinet of Charilaos Trikoupis	9 May 1886 - 24 October 1890	Charilaos Trikoupis	majority government
Cabinet of Dimitrios Valvis	30 April - 9 May 1886	Dimitrios Valvis	extra-parliamentary government appointed by King George I
First Cabinet of Theodoros Deligiannis	19 April 1885 - 30 April 1886	Theodoros Deligiannis	National Party
Fourth Cabinet of Charilaos Trikoupis	3 March 1882 - 19 April 1885	Charilaos Trikoupis	Majority government
Tenth Cabinet of Alexandros Koumoundouros	13 October 1880 - 3 March 1882	Alexandros Koumoundouros	Majority government
Third Cabinet of Charilaos Trikoupis	10 March - 13 October 1880	Charilaos Trikoupis	Majority government
Ninth Cabinet of Alexandros Koumoundouros	26 October 1878 - 10 March 1880	Alexandros Koumoundouros	Winner of 1879 Greek legislative election
Second Cabinet of Charilaos Trikoupis	21 October - 26 October 1878	Charilaos Trikoupis	Parliamentary majority
Eighth Cabinet of Alexandros Koumoundouros	11 January - 21 October 1878	Alexandros Koumoundouros	Parliamentary majority
Fifth Cabinet of Konstantinos Kanaris	26 May 1877 - 11 January 1878	Konstantinos Kanaris	Coalition cabinet (ecumenical)
Seventh Cabinet of Alexandros Koumoundouros	19 - 26 May 1877	Alexandros Koumoundouros	Parliamentary majority
Sixth Cabinet of Epameinondas Deligiorgis	26 February - 19 May 1877	Epameinondas Deligiorgis	Parliamentary majority
Sixth Cabinet of Alexandros Koumoundouros	1 December 1876 - 26 February 1877	Alexandros Koumoundouros	Parliamentary majority
Fifth Cabinet of Epameinondas Deligiorgis	26 November - 1 December 1876	Epameinondas Deligiorgis	Parliamentary minority
Fifth Cabinet of Alexandros Koumoundouros	15 October 1875 - 26 November 1876	Alexandros Koumoundouros	Parliamentary majority (dedilomeni principle)
First Cabinet of Charilaos Trikoupis	27 April - 15 October 1875	Charilaos Trikoupis	appointed by King George I
Eighth Cabinet of Dimitrios Voulgaris	9 February 1874 - 27 April 1875	Dimitrios Voulgaris	appointed by King George I
Fourth Cabinet of Epameinondas Deligiorgis	8 July 1872 - 9 February 1874	Epameinondas Deligiorgis	parliamentary minority
Seventh Cabinet of Dimitrios Voulgaris	25 December 1871 - 8 July 1872	Dimitrios Voulgaris	coalition government (Voulgaris - Koumoundouros)
Second Cabinet of Thrasyvoulos Zaimis	28 October - 25 December 1871	Thrasyvoulos Zaimis	Parliamentary majority
Fourth Cabinet of Alexandros Koumoundouros	3 December 1870 - 28 October 1871	Alexandros Koumoundouros	Parliamentary majority
Third Cabinet of Epameinondas Deligiorgis	9 July - 3 December 1870	Epameinondas Deligiorgis	appointed by King George I
First Cabinet of Thrasyvoulos Zaimis	25 January 1869 - 9 July 1870	Thrasyvoulos Zaimis	appointed by King George I
Sixth Cabinet of Dimitrios Voulgaris	25 January 1868 - 25 January 1869	Dimitrios Voulgaris	caretaker government to hold 1868 Greek legislative election /majority government after elections
Cabinet of Aristeidis Moraitinis	20 December 1867 - 25 January 1868	Aristeidis Moraitinis	caretaker government to hold legislative election
Third Cabinet of Alexandros Koumoundouros	18 December 1866 - 20 December 1867	Alexandros Koumoundouros	Parliamentary majority
Fifth Cabinet of Dimitrios Voulgaris	9 June 1866 - 17 December 1866	Dimitrios Voulgaris	coalition government between Voulgaris-Deligiorgis
Second Cabinet of Benizelos Roufos	28 November 1865 - 9 June 1866	Benizelos Roufos	appointed with the consent of the three leaders (Koumoundoros, Voulgaris, Deligiorgis)
Second Cabinet of Epameinondas Deligiorgis	13 - 28 November 1865	Epameinondas Deligiorgis	Parliamentary minority
Second Cabinet of Alexandros Koumoundouros	6 - 13 November 1865	Alexandros Koumoundouros	Parliamentary minority
Cabinet of Dimitrios Voulgaris (1865)	3 - 6 November 1865	Dimitrios Voulgaris	Parliamentary minority
First Cabinet of E. Deligiorgis	20 October - 3 November 1865	Epameinondas Deligiorgis	Parliamentary minority
First Cabinet of A. Koumoundouros	2 March - 20 October 1865	Alexandros Koumoundouros	Winner of 1865 Greek legislative election
Fourth Cabinet of K. Kanaris	26 July 1864 - 2 March 1865	Konstantinos Kanaris	appointed by Second National Assembly of the Greeks at Athens
Cabinet of Zinovios Valvis (1864)	16 April - 26 July 1864	Zinovios Valvis	appointed by Second National Assembly at Athens
Cabinet of Konstantinos Kanaris (1864, March)	5 March - 16 April 1864	Konstantinos Kanaris	appointed by Second National Assembly at Athens
Cabinet of Dimitrios Voulgaris (1863)	25 October 1863 - 5 March 1864	Dimitrios Voulgaris	majority at the Second National Assembly of the Greeks at Athens
Cabinet of Benizelos Roufos (1863)	29 April - 18 October 1863	Benizelos Roufos	appointed by Second National Assembly at Athens
Cabinet of Diomidis Kyriakos (1863)	27 March - 29 April 1863	Diomidis Kyriakos	appointed by Second National Assembly at Athens
Cabinet of Zinovios Valvis (1863)	11 February - 25 March 1863	Zinovios Valvis	appointed by Second National Assembly at Athens
Cabinet of Aristidis Moraitinis (1863)	9 - 11 February 1863	Aristidis Moraitinis	appointed by Second National Assembly at Athens
Provisional Government of Greece (1862–63)	11 October 1862 - 8 February 1863	D. Voulgaris - B. Roufos - K. Kanaris	coalition government (ecumenical) after King Otto's expulsion

== Kingdom of Greece - Constitutional monarchy (1844 - 1862) ==
Cabinet	Tenure	Prime Minister	Parties
Cabinet of Ioannis Kolokotronis (1862)	26 May - 11 October 1862	Ioannis Kolokotronis	appointed by King Otto
Cabinet of Athanasios Miaoulis (1857)	13 November 1857 - 26 May 1862	Athanasios Miaoulis	appointed by King Otto
Cabinet of Dimitrios Voulgaris (1855)	29 September 1855 - 13 November 1857	Dimitrios Voulgaris	appointed by King Otto
Cabinet of Alexandros Mavrokordatos (1854)	16 May 1854 - 29 September 1855	Alexandros Mavrokordatos	appointed by King Otto
Cabinet of Antonios Kriezis (1849)	14 December 1849 - 16 May 1854	Antonios Kriezis	appointed by King Otto
Cabinet of Konstantinos Kanaris (1848)	27 October 1848 - 14 December 1849	Konstantinos Kanaris	coalition government
Cabinet of Georgios Kountouriotis (1848)	8 March - 12 October 1848	Georgios Kountouriotis	extra parliamentary government appointed by King Otto
Cabinet of Kitsos Tzavelas (1847)	5 September 1847 - 12 October 1848	Kitsos Tzavelas	parliamentary majority
Cabinet of Ioannis Kolettis (1844)	6 August 1844 - 5 September 1847	Ioannis Kolettis	parliamentary majority
Cabinet of Alexandros Mavrokordatos (1844)	30 March - 4 August 1844	Alexandros Mavrokordatos	caretaker government to hold first legislative elections
Cabinet of Konstantinos Kanaris (1844)	12 February - 30 March 1844	Konstantinos Kanaris	caretaker government
Cabinet of Andreas Metaxas (1843)	3 September 1843 - 12 February 1844	Andreas Metaxas	caretaker coalition government

== Kingdom of Greece - Absolut Monarchy (1833-1843) ==
Cabinet	Tenure	Prime Minister	Parties
Cabinet of Otto of Greece (1841)	10 August 1841 - 3 September 1843	Otto of Greece	
Cabinet of Alexandros Mavrokordatos (1841)	24 June - 10 August 1841	Alexandros Mavrokordatos	appointed by the King
Cabinet of Otto of Greece (1837)	8 December 1837 - 24 June 1841	Otto of Greece	
Cabinet of Ignaz von Rundhart (1837)	2 February - 8 December 1837	Ignaz von Rundhart	appointed by the King
Cabinet of Josef Ludwig von Armansperg	9 May 1835 - 2 February 1837	Josef Ludwig von Armansperg	Regency council of Otto of Greece
Cabinet of Ioannis Kolettis (1834)	31 May 1834 - 9 May 1835	Ioannis Kolettis	appointed by the Regency council of Otto of Greece
Cabinet of Alexandros Mavrokordatos (1833)	12 October 1833 - 31 May 1834	Alexandros Mavrokordatos	appointed by the Regency council of Otto of Greece
Cabinet of Spyridon Trikoupis (April 1833)	3 April 1833 - 12 October 1833	Spyridon Trikoupis	appointed by the Regency council of Otto of Greece
Cabinet of Spyridon Trikoupis (January 1833)	25 January - 3 April 1833	Spyridon Trikoupis	appointed by the Regency

== Hellenic State (1827 - 1833) ==
Cabinet	Tenure	leader
Administrative Committee of Greece (1832)	28 March 1832 -25 January 1833	5 member committee
Administrative Committee of Greece (1831)	27 September 1831- 10 December 1831	Augustinos Kapodistrias (president)
Cabinet of Ioannis Kapodistrias	20 January 1828 - 27 September 1831	Ioannis Kapodistrias (governor)
Vice-gubernatorial Committee of 1827	3 April 1827 - 20 January 1828	3 member committee

== Provisional Administration of Greece (1822 - 1827) ==
Cabinet	Tenure	leader
Administrative Committee of Grece (1826)	18 April 1826 - 26 March 1827	Andreas Zaimis (president of the comitte)
Executive of 1824	11 October 1824 - 17 April 1826	Georgios Kountouriotis (president of the Executive)
Executive of 1823	26 April 1823 - 11 October 1824	Petrobey Mavromichalis (26 April 1823 - 5 January 1824) discharged (president of the Executive); Georgios Kountouriotis (6 January 1824 - 11 October 1824) (president of the Executive)
Executive of 1822	15 January 1822 - 26 April 1823	Alexandros Mavrokordatos (president of the Executive)

== See also ==
- List of heads of state of Greece
- List of Prime Ministers of Greece

== Sources ==
- Γενική Γραμματεία Νομικών και Κοινοβουλευτικών Θεμάτων (General Secretariat of the Government - List of Greek governments since 1909)
- Ανδρέας Γ. Δημητρόπουλος : "Οι Ελληνικές κυβερνήσεις 1843 - 2004" (Andreas G. Dimitropoulos : Greek governments 1843 - 2004)
- Τρύφων Ευαγγελίδης: "Ιστορία του Όθωνος Βασιλέως της Ελλάδος (1832-1862) : Κατά τας νεωτάτας πηγάς ξένων τε και ημετέρων ιστορικών" (Trifon Evaggelidis: History of Otto, King of Greece (1832 - 1862)...)
- Γεώργιος Δ. Δημακόπουλος: "Αι Κυβερνητικαί Αρχαί της Ελληνικής Πολιτείας (1827-1833)" (G.D.Dimakopoulos: Hellenic State government authorities (1827 - 1833))
- Γεώργιος Δ. Δημακόπουλος: "Η διοικητική οργάνωσις κατά την Ελληνικήν Επανάστασιν (1821 - 1827)" (G.D.Dimakopoulos: The administrative organisation during the Greek War of Independence")
