= Dimitrios Liapidis =

Greek lawyer and politician

Dimitrios Liapidis (Greek: Δημήτριος Λιαπίδης; Kalabaka, Trikala, Ottoman Empire 1871 – ?) was a Greek politician.

== Biography ==
He was from Kalabaka and studied medicine. He entered the army reaching the rank of general chief physician. He also acted as president of the community of Kalabaka.

He was elected member of parliament for Trikala, with the support of the Farmers' Party in the 1932 Greek legislative election and reelected as member of parliament for Kalabaka in 1933 and 1935.
