= Georgios Filippidis =

Greek politician

Georgios Filippidis (Greek: Γεώργιος Φιλιππίδης) was a Greek politician and landowner.

He was born in Milies, Pelion, was the son of Argyros Filippidis and descended from a wealthy and family in the area. He was president of the community of Milies.

He was elected member of parliament for Larisa, with the support People's Party in the 1932 election and was reelected for Volos in 1933, and for Larisa again in 1935 and 1946.
