= Konstantinos Demertzis =

Greek politician (1876–1936)

- Κωνσταντίνος Δεμερτζής
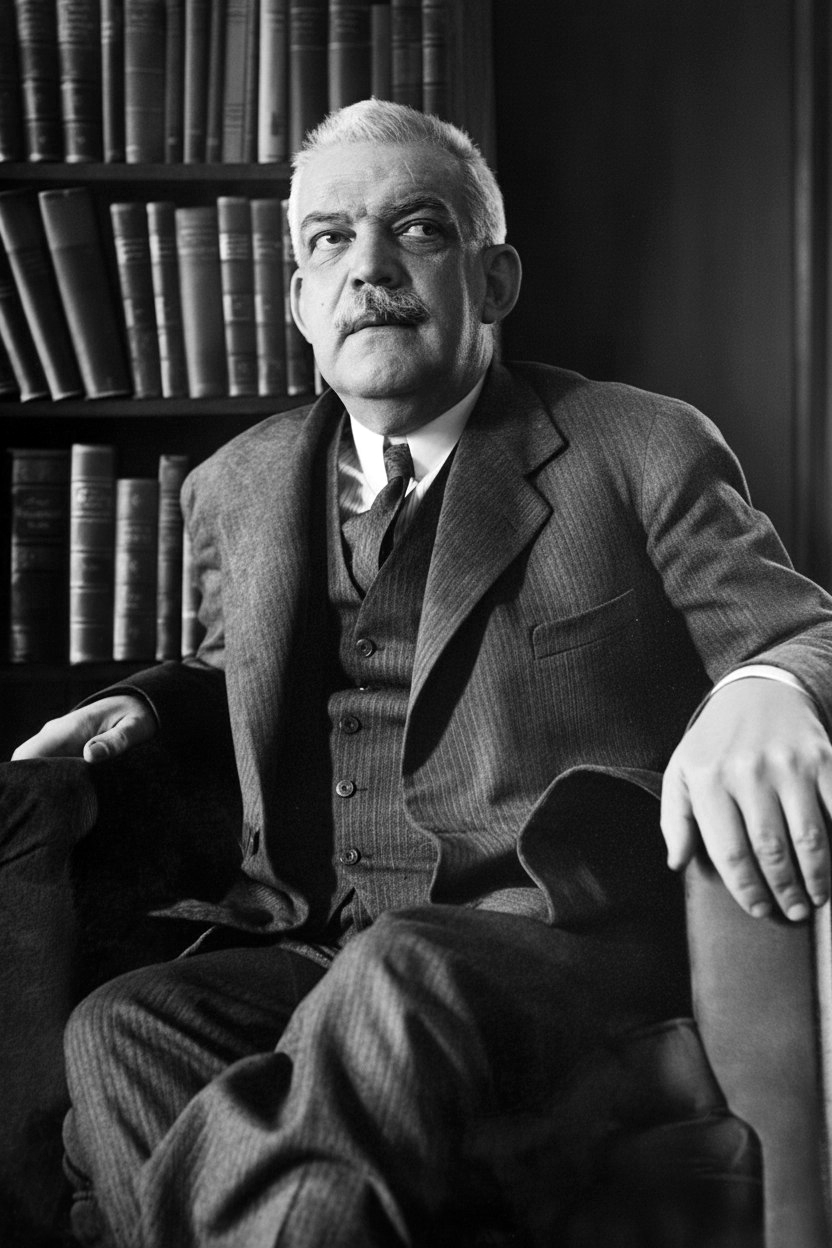
- Demertzis in 1935

Prime Minister of Greece
- In office 30 November 1935 – 13 April 1936
- Monarch: George II
- Preceded by: Georgios Kondylis
- Succeeded by: Ioannis Metaxas

Personal details
- Born: 12 January 1876 Athens, Greece
- Died: 13 April 1936 (aged 60) Athens, Greece
- Party: Freethinkers' Party (1922–1936)

Konstantinos Demertzis (Greek: Κωνσταντίνος Δεμερτζής; January 12, 1876 – April 13, 1936) was a Greek academic and politician. He was the 49th Prime Minister of Greece from November 1935 to April 1936. Demertzis died during his mandate, of a heart attack, on April 13, 1936.

== Life and career ==
He was born in Athens and studied at the Law School of the University of Athens, from which he was awarded a doctorate in 1896. He then went to Munich where he stayed for three years. Returning to Athens, he started teaching as professor of law. In 1904, he became a professor of Civil law, teaching for four years. In 1910, he was elected for the first time as a Member of Parliament with the Liberal Party in the parliamentary elections which were held on November 28, 1910, contributing the most due to his knowledge to the revision of the Constitution in 1911. Having a good command of the judiciary, he was in favor of suspending the judges for life.

== Political career ==
=== First period of political action (1912–1928) ===
In the elections on March 11, 1912, he was elected a member of parliament and in 1913 he succeeded Nikolaos Stratos in the Ministry of Marines of the Venizelos government, where he remained for about a year. However, he also became Minister of the Navy a second time during the government of Alexandros Zaimis in 1917.

In 1924, together with other politicians of the time, he founded the "Unionist Progressive Party", in which he was declared leader. The life of this party was short-lived.

General Theodoros Pangalos assumed power in June 1925, and dissolved Parliament in September of the same year. A few months later, in March 1926, after the resignation of the President of the Republic, Pavlos Kountouriotis, who was protesting the arbitrariness of the Pangalos government, Demertzis was nominated, by almost all the parties at the time, as a common candidate to succeed him. The democratic parties finally called for abstention, but to no avail, while Demertzis also did not receive support. Pangalos was comfortably elected President of the Republic, receiving 782,589 votes against Demertzis's 56,126. After the fall of the Pangalos dictatorship, in the elections on November 7, 1926, he was elected Member of Parliament for Athens.

In 1928, he assumed the position of professor of family law at the Law School of Athens. From that year until 1935, he remained away from any involvement with politics, limiting himself to his university duties.

=== Prime Minister (1935–1936) ===
In 1935 and after the restoration of the Kingdom in Greece, Konstantinos Demertzis, who was not a member of any political party at the time, was invited by King George II to take over as prime minister and finally form the " Achron government ", succeeding Georgios Kondylis. Thus, on November 30, 1935, he was sworn in as prime minister, keeping the Ministry of Foreign Affairs for himself. The main task of his government was to hold elections, which took place on January 26, 1936, with proven exemplary order. The day after the elections, Demertzis put his resignation at the disposal of the King, but because all the attempts of negotiations made with the political leaders failed to form a government, according to the then constitution, King George II once again resorted to Demertzis in order to form government and then to be judged by the Parliament with a vote of confidence. In the end, this process was not completed, because on the morning of April 13, 1936, Konstantinos Demertzis died from a heart attack. His position was taken by his party's vice-president and former vice-president of his government, Ioannis Metaxas.
