= Farmers' Party (Greece) =

The Farmers' Party (Greek: Αγροτικό Κόμμα) was a political party in Greece in the 1920s and 1930s.

== History ==
The party first contested national elections in 1928, but failed to win a seat in the parliamentary elections that year. However, they won two seats in the Senate elections the following year.

The 1932 elections saw the party win 13 seats in the Vouli, making it the fourth-largest faction in the Hellenic Parliament after the People's Party, the Liberal Party and the National Democratic Party, although they also lost both seats in the Senate.

In the 1933 elections the party was reduced to a single seat in the Vouli, and did not contest any further elections.
