= Ioannis Metaxas =

Prime Minister of Greece from 1936 to 1941

- Ιωάννης Μεταξάς
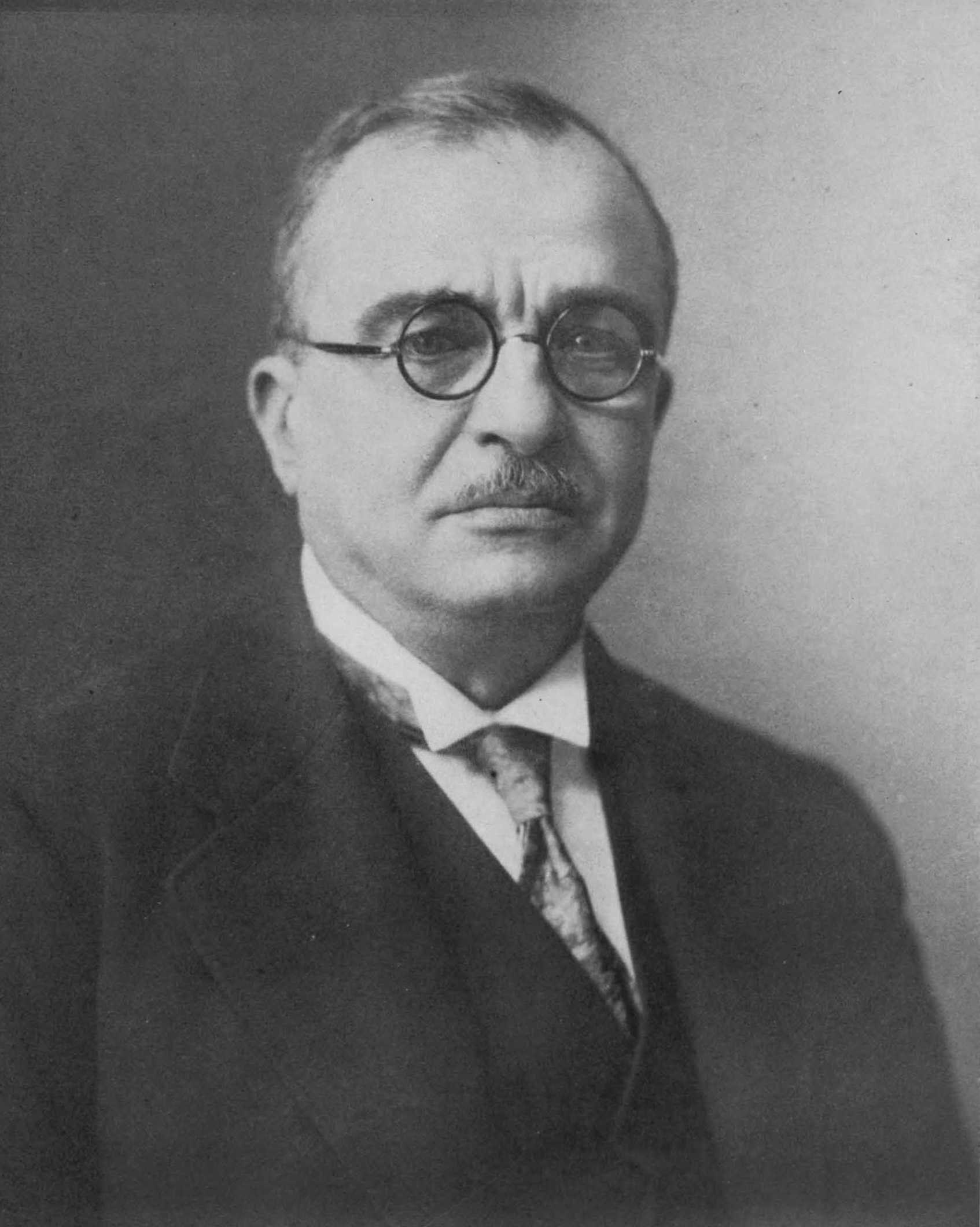
- Metaxas in 1937

Prime Minister of Greece
- In office 13 April 1936 – 29 January 1941
- Monarch: George II
- Preceded by: Konstantinos Demertzis
- Succeeded by: Alexandros Koryzis

Deputy Prime Minister of Greece
- In office 30 November 1935 – 12 April 1936
- Monarch: George II
- Prime Minister: Konstantinos Demertzis
- Preceded by: Ioannis Theotokis
- Succeeded by: Konstantinos Zavitsianos

Minister of Defense
- In office 5 March 1935 – 13 March 1935
- President: Alexandros Zaimis
- Prime Minister: Panagis Tsaldaris
- Preceded by: Georgios Kondylis
- Succeeded by: Georgios Kondylis
- In office 14 March 1936 – 29 January 1941
- Monarch: George II
- Prime Minister: Konstantinos Demertzis; Himself
- Preceded by: Konstantinos Demertzis
- Succeeded by: Alexandros Koryzis

Minister of the Interior
- In office 4 November 1932 – 16 January 1933
- President: Alexandros Zaimis
- Prime Minister: Panagis Tsaldaris
- Preceded by: Ioannis Tsirimokos
- Succeeded by: Georgios Maris

Minister of Public Transport
- In office 4 December 1926 – 4 July 1928
- President: Pavlos Kountouriotis
- Prime Minister: Alexandros Zaimis

Personal details
- Born: 12 April 1871 Vathy, Ithaca, Greece
- Died: 29 January 1941 (aged 69) Kifissia, Greece
- Cause of death: Toxemia
- Party: Freethinkers' Party (1922–1936); Independent (1936–1941)
- Education: Hellenic Army Academy; Prussian War College
- Awards: Gold Cross of the Order of the Redeemer
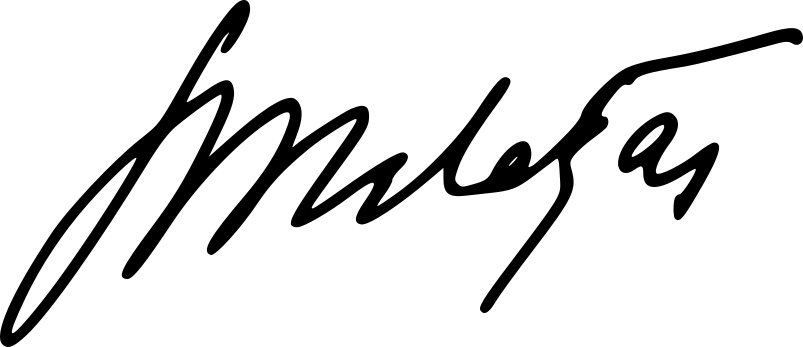
- Signature

Military service
- Allegiance: Kingdom of Greece
- Branch/service: Hellenic Army
- Years of service: 1890–1920
- Rank: Lieutenant General
- Unit: Army of Thessaly
- Commands: Epistratoi
- Battles/wars: Greco-Turkish War (1897); Balkan Wars; First Balkan War; Battle of Bizani; Second Balkan War; World War I; National Schism; Noemvriana

Ioannis Metaxas (Note: /ˈmɛtəksɑːs/) (Greek: Ιωάννης Μεταξάς; 12 April 1871 – 29 January 1941) was a Greek general and statesman who was the prime minister of Greece from 1936 until his death in 1941. He governed constitutionally for the first four months of his tenure, and thereafter as the strongman leader of the 4th of August Regime, following his appointment by King George II.

Born to an aristocratic family in Ithaca, Metaxas took part in the Greco-Turkish War of 1897 and the Balkan Wars (1912–13), and quickly rose through the ranks of the Hellenic Army. As a monarchist during the National Schism, Metaxas unsuccessfully opposed Prime Minister Eleftherios Venizelos and Greece's entry in World War I, most famously leading monarchist forces during the Noemvriana. He was exiled to Corsica in response in 1917. On his return, Metaxas moved into politics and founded the Freethinkers' Party, but had only limited success under the Second Hellenic Republic.

Metaxas was appointed prime minister in April 1936, a year after the Greek monarchy was restored. With the support of King George II, Metaxas initiated a self-coup and established an authoritarian, nationalist, and anti-communist regime, which Metaxas himself and some historians called totalitarian. The ideology and system associated with his rule, Metaxism, has been described as a form of fascism, a conventional authoritarian-conservative dictatorship, or a regime with a strong fascist component.

On 28 October 1940, Metaxas rejected an ultimatum imposed by the Italians to surrender, committing Greece to the Allies and bringing the country into World War II. He died in January 1941 during the Greco–Italian War from a bloodstream infection, before the German invasion and subsequent fall of Greece.

== Military career ==
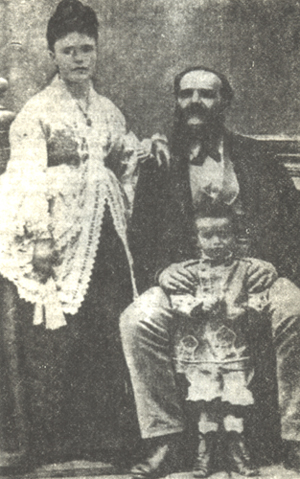
Metaxas as a child with his parents

Ioannis Metaxas was born in Vathy on the island of Ithaca in 1871. The Metaxas family descended from Byzantine nobility and in the 17th century were inscribed in the Libro d'Oro of the Ionian islands, which were then a Venetian possession. In 1879, the family moved to Kefalonia. Metaxas completed high school in Argostoli and then enrolled at the Hellenic Military Academy in 1885.

After graduating from the Academy, he became a career military officer, being sworn in as an Engineers 2nd Lieutenant on 10 August 1890. He first saw action in the Greco-Turkish War of 1897 attached to the staff of the Greek commander-in-chief, Crown Prince Constantine. Metaxas became a protégé of Constantine and much of his rise through the ranks of the Hellenic Army was a consequence of Crown Prince's patronage. Greece was characterized by a clientist system at the time, and a powerful patron in the form of Constantine boosted Metaxas's career.

After the war, he continued his military studies at the Berlin War Academy from 1899 to 1903. Metaxas was very close to Constantine and was personally selected by the Crown Prince to go to Berlin. During his time at the War Academy, Metaxas received consistently high marks from his German instructors with one writing that he was "ein kleiner Moltke" ("a little Moltke" – a reference to Metaxas's short stature). Metaxas's time in Germany made him into an admirer of Prussian militarism.

In his diary in March 1900, he wrote: "I have no other ambition than to fulfill my duty to my king and crown prince ... I consider the king the representative of the past, present and future of the nation. All opposition to him from whatever quarter I reject and find repulsive." Metaxas also expressed his opposition to the "intemperate parliamentarism" of Greece, preferring the authoritarian German system where the Chancellor was responsible to the Emperor, not the Reichstag. On his return in 1904, he joined the newly formed General Staff Corps. He was part of the modernizing process of the Greek Army before the Balkan Wars (1912–13). However, he opposed the Goudi coup. For Metaxas, the coup represented an attack on everything he valued because the Military League behind the coup were opposed to Constantine and the other princes holding positions of command.

=== Balkan Wars ===
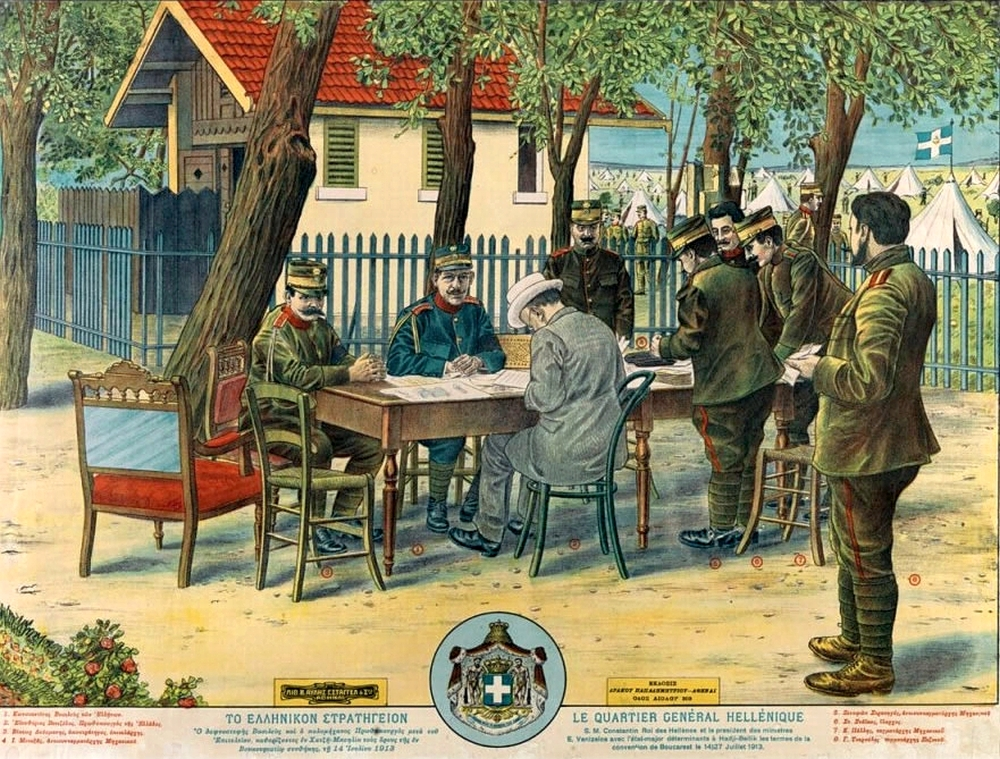
Greek lithograph during the Balkan Wars depicting Metaxas (at the back of the table) with King Constantine, PM Venizelos and other officers at the HQs of the Army.

In 1910, Metaxas was appointed by Prime Minister Eleftherios Venizelos, who had also assumed the post of Minister of Military Affairs, as his adjutant. Venizelos appointed Metaxas as part of an effort at rapprochement with the monarchy. Despite Venizelos's efforts to reach out, Metaxas was strongly opposed to his decision to have a French military mission arrive to train the Greek Army, and almost resigned in protest. In 1912, just before the Balkan Wars, Venizelos appointed Metaxas to negotiate the military treaty between Greece and Bulgaria, sending him to Sofia. He participated in the First Balkan War as a captain in the operations staff of the Army of Thessaly, before joining Venizelos as a military expert in the London Conference of 1912–13 in December 1912. In May 1913, as military plenipotentiary, he negotiated the military terms of the Greek–Serbian Alliance.

He took part in the Second Balkan War when he was promoted to Lieutenant Colonel. After the end of the Balkan Wars, he was appointed director of the 1st (Operations) Directorate of the Army Staff Service, and became deputy head of the Staff Service in January 1915. In October 1913, he was awarded by the King with the Golden Cross of the Redeemer.

=== Greco-Turkish crisis of 1914 ===
In the spring and summer of 1914, Greece found itself in a confrontation with the Ottoman Empire over the status of the eastern Aegean Islands, which had been occupied by Greece in the First Balkan War, and were finally awarded to Greece on 31 January 1914 by the Great Powers. The Ottomans refused to accept this, leading to a naval arms race between the two countries and persecutions of Greeks in Asia Minor. On 29 May, the Greek government issued an official protest to the Sublime Porte, threatening a breach of relations and even war, if the persecutions were not stopped.

On 6 June 1914, Metaxas, as the de facto head of the Staff Service, presented a study on the military options against the Ottoman Empire: the most decisive maneuver, a landing of the entire Greek army in Asia Minor, was virtually impossible due to the hostility with Bulgaria; instead, Metaxas proposed the sudden occupation of the Gallipoli Peninsula, without a prior declaration of war, the clearing of the Dardanelles, and the occupation of Constantinople so as to force the Ottomans to negotiate. However, on the previous day, the Ottoman government had suggested mutual talks, and the tension eased enough for Prime Minister Venizelos and the Ottoman Grand Vizier, Said Halim Pasha, to meet in Brussels in July.

=== World War I and the National Schism ===
Following the outbreak of World War I, the prospect of Greece's possible entry into the war emerged, especially given the obligation to provide military assistance to Serbia based on the Greek–Serbian Alliance. By 12 July 1914, the Serbian government had requested Greece's aid following the terms of the alliance, in the case of an Austrian and Bulgarian attack. Greece rejected the request on the grounds that Serbia had undertaken to provide 150,000 troops in the area of Gevgelija to guard against a Bulgarian attack; in addition, if Greece sent her army to fight the Austrians along the Danube, this would only incite a Bulgarian attack against both countries, with insufficient forces left to oppose it.

==== Clash with Venizelos over Greece's entry in the war ====
A German request on 14 July 1914 to join the Central Powers was rejected by both Venizelos and King Constantine, but on 1 August, Venizelos sounded out the Entente Powers, Britain, France, and Russia. The Entente governments were lukewarm to Venizelos' proposals, since they hoped to entice Bulgaria on their side, even offering territorial concessions at the expense of Serbia, Greece, and Romania. Russia in particular considered her interests best served if Greece remained neutral.

On 19 November, Serbia repeated its request for Greek assistance, supported by the Entente. Venizelos asked Metaxas for an evaluation of the situation; the opinion of the latter was that without a simultaneous entry of Romania into the war on the side of the Allies, Greece's position was too risky. Following the firm refusal of Romania to be drawn into the conflict at this time, the proposal was scuttled. On 11 January 1915, the British offered Greece "significant territorial concessions in Asia Minor" if it would enter the war to support Serbia, and in exchange for satisfying some of the Bulgarian territorial demands in Macedonia (Kavala, Drama, and Chrysoupolis) in exchange for Bulgarian entry into the war on the side of the Entente.

Venizelos argued in favor of the proposal, but Metaxas disagreed, for reasons which he laid down in a memorandum on 20 January: the Austrians were likely to defeat the Serbian army before a Greek mobilization could be completed, Bulgaria was likely to flank any Greek forces fighting against the Austrians, while a Romanian intervention would not be decisive. Metaxas judged that even if Bulgaria joined the Entente, it still would not suffice to shift the balance in Central Europe, and recommended the presence of four Allied army corps in Macedonia as the minimum necessary force for any substantial aid to the Greeks and Serbs. Furthermore, Metaxas argued that a Greek entry into the war would once again expose the Greeks of Asia Minor to Turkish reprisals. Venizelos rejected this report, and recommended entry into the war in a memorandum to the King, provided that Bulgaria and Romania also joined the Entente. By that time, however, it was clear that Bulgaria was aligning towards the Central Powers, and Romania's determination to remain neutral led the Greek government to again refuse.

However, in February 1915, the Entente attack on Gallipoli began. Venizelos decided to offer an army corps and the entire Greek fleet to assist the Entente, making an official offer on 16 February, despite the King's reservations. This caused Metaxas to resign on the next day in protest, basing his argument on the loss of the element of surprise, the fortification of the straits, the fact that a single army corps was insufficient to alter the balance of forces, and the uncertain stance of Bulgaria. Metaxas insisted that the campaign had been mishandled thus far, and that even if the Entente captured Gallipoli, the Turks still fielded 12 divisions in Eastern Thrace. Shaken by Metaxas's resignation, Venizelos convened meetings of the Crown Council (the King, Venizelos, and the living former prime ministers) on 18 and 20 February, but they proved indecisive. King Constantine decided to keep the country neutral, whereupon Venizelos submitted his resignation on 21 February 1915.

Venizelos won the May 1915 elections, and formed a new government on 17 August. When Bulgaria signed a treaty of alliance with Germany and mobilized against Serbia, Venizelos ordered a Greek counter-mobilization (10 September 1916). As part of the mobilization, Metaxas was recalled to active duty as deputy chief of staff. After Venizelos condoned the landing of British and French troops in Thessaloniki to aid the collapsing Serbian army, Venizelos presented his case for participation in the war to Parliament, securing 152 votes in favor to 102 against in a vote during the early hours of 22 September. On the next day, however, King Constantine dismissed Venizelos, and called upon Alexandros Zaimis to form a government.

==== Reservists and Noemvriana ====
This dismissal solidified the rift between monarchists and Venizelists, creating the "National Schism" that would be a centerpiece of Greek politics for decades. In May and August 1916, Constantine and the General Staff allowed Fort Roupel and parts of eastern Macedonia to be occupied, without opposition, by the Central Powers (Germany and Bulgaria), as a counterbalance to the Allied presence in Thessaloniki. This caused popular anger, especially in Greek Macedonia, and among Venizelist officers.

In August 1916, Venizelist officers launched a revolt in Greece's northern city of Thessaloniki, which resulted in the establishment of a separate "Government of National Defence" under Venizelos. The new government, with the Allied support, expanded its control over half the country and entered the war on the Allies' side. Meanwhile, the official Greek state and the royal government remained neutral. King Constantine and Metaxas were accused as pro-German by their Venizelist opponents. However they kept negotiating with the Allies a possible entry with their side.

Metaxas was later the creator and head of the monarchist paramilitary Epistratoi (reservists) forces during the Noemvriana events in Athens. When the French/British landed in Athens and demanded the surrender of material equal lost to Fort Rupel (as guarantee for Greece's neutrality), they met resistance. In June 1917, under Allied pressure, King Constantine was deposed, Alexander became King, and Venizelos came to power, declaring war officially on behalf of the whole country on 29 June 1917.

== Exile and interwar political career ==
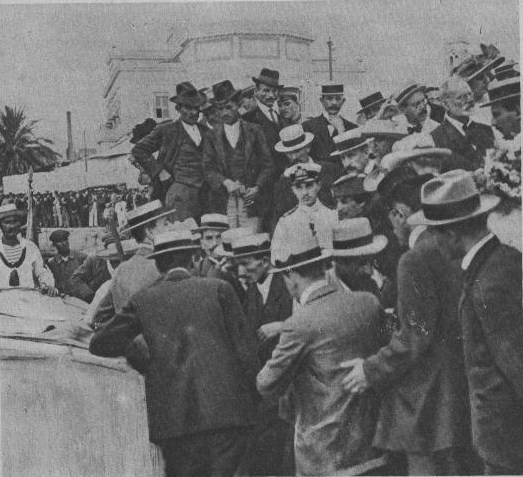
Metaxas with other political opponents of Venizelos go in exile, summer 1917

With Venizelos' coming to power in Summer 1917, Metaxas, along with other notable antivenizelists, were exiled to Corsica, from where he escaped to Sardinia (with Gounaris and Pesmazoglou) and later found himself with his family to Siena, Italy, while King Constantine with the royal family left for Switzerland. In January 1920, Metaxas was sentenced to death in absentia for his role in the Noemvriana.

He returned to Greece in November 1920, after the electoral defeat of Eleftherios Venizelos. He was reinstated in the army with the rank of Major General, but as he opposed the continued Greek campaign in Asia Minor, he resigned and went into retirement on 28 December 1920. He stated the following for the Greek Occupation of Anatolia to Venizelos: "The Greek state is not today ready for the government and exploitation of a so extensive a territory." He subsequently repeatedly rejected the military leadership of the Greek army offered to him by Constantine. As a soldier, Metaxas argued that Greece did not have logistical capacity nor the economic resources to support an army in the interior of Anatolia, and the decision by his patron, King Constantine, to continue the war against Turkey caused a rift between the two.

Following the defeat of Greek forces in Asia Minor, King Constantine was again forced into exile by the 11 September 1922 Revolution, led by Col. Nikolaos Plastiras. Metaxas moved into politics and founded the Freethinkers' Party on 12 October 1922. However, his association with the failed Monarchist Leonardopoulos-Gargalidis coup attempt in October 1923 forced him to flee the country again. Soon after, King George II (son of Constantine I) was also forced into exile. The monarchy was abolished, and the Second Hellenic Republic was proclaimed, in March 1924.

Metaxas returned to Greece soon after, publicly stating his acceptance of the Republic regime. Despite a promising start, and his status as one of the most prominent Monarchist politicians, Metaxas's foray into politics was not very successful. In the 1926 elections, his Freethinkers' Party claimed 15.8% of the vote and 52 seats in Parliament, putting it almost on a par with the other main Monarchist party, the People's Party. As a result, Metaxas became Communications Minister in the "ecumenical government" formed under Alexandros Zaimis.

However, infighting within the party and the departure of many members plunged the party to 5.3% and a single seat in the 1928 elections. The 1932 and 1933 elections saw the percentage drop to 1.6%, although the party still returned three MPs, and Metaxas became Interior Minister in the Panagis Tsaldaris cabinet. Metaxas was regarded as the most intransigent and extreme of all the Monarchist politicians and his open hostility to parliamentary government as useless might perhaps explain the relative failure of his parliamentary career. By 1933, even the officially monarchist Populist Party had tacitly came to accept the republic as much as the Liberals as both the Populist and Liberal leaders wanted a system that guaranteed the possibility of orderly change and the rule of law, and Metaxas's call for something resembling an absolute monarchy put him out of the mainstream of Greek politics. In 1933, there was a failed assassination attempt against Venizelos, which Metaxas praised in his newspaper Hellenki, expressing regret only that the attempt failed. The would-be assassins were never arrested, but Metaxas's editorial stance led to widespread suspicions both at the time and since that he was involved, through no definitive evidence has ever emerged.

On 1 March 1935, in Thessaloniki there was an attempted coup d'état by Venizelist officers ostensibly over the slow pace of the investigation into the attempted assassination, which almost succeeded. Thessaloniki, together with the rest of Greek Macedonia, had taken in the bulk of the about 1.3 million Greeks expelled from Turkey in the compulsory population exchange of 1923, and the majority of the refugees lived in extreme poverty with those living in rural areas making their living picking tobacco.

The collapse of international tobacco prices in the Great Depression lowered living conditions even more and Macedonia was the region of Greece hit worse by the Depression. As it was under the leadership of King Constantine that Greece was defeated in 1922, the refugees tended to be very hostile towards the House of Glücksburg and Thessaloniki was known as a "hotbed of republicanism".

The failed coup with its connotations of social unrest and protest alarmed the Greek elite and led to a swing towards the right among the elite, though not the Greek people. As a result of the failed coup, the Liberals came to be viewed within the elite as the party of insurgency and chaos while many Populists frightened by the prospect of a revolution swung behind Metaxas's viewpoint.

In response to the fears of the impoverished Greek people rising up in a revolution, Metaxas called for a "new order" in Greece, arguing that the Great Depression proved the failure of democracy and authoritarianism was the solution. Under pressure from the newly empowered and more extreme Monarchists like Metaxas, Tsaldaris announced for the first time his intention to hold a referendum on restoring the monarchy. In the 1935 elections, he cooperated in a union with other small Monarchist parties, returning seven MPs, a performance repeated in the 1936 elections.

Tsaldaris had called early elections in 1935 as a way of putting off the pressure to hold a referendum on restoring the monarchy, and his decisive victory in an election boycotted by the Liberals for the moment seemed to strengthened his hand. In the Peloponnese region, which was the traditional center of Greek royalism, Metaxas's party had fared poorly, but he won 20% of the vote in Athens, mostly in middle class and upper-class neighborhoods as the well off looked towards Metaxas as the best man to "impose order" on Greece.

When the War Minister, General Georgios Kondylis, until then a republican and one of the founders of the First Hellenic Republic in 1924, pronounced himself in favor of restoring the monarchy on 3 July 1935, he demoralized the republicans and the more opportunistic republicans started to defect over to the monarchist camp, though Metaxas drew little benefit electorally. Kondylis pronounced himself an admirer of Fascist Italy and Nazi Germany, and based his call to end the republic he himself had helped to found under the grounds that restoring the monarchy would permanently shift the center of the political gravity in Greece to the right.

Under strong pressure from Kondylis, Tsaldaris finally brought the necessary legislation for a referendum to a vote on the floor of parliament on 10 July 1935. From June to October 1935, there was a crisis atmosphere in Greece as the Army was purged of Venizelist officers, rumors swirled of coups being planned, Metaxas spoke openly of the possibility of a civil war and most politicians were fearful of being caught on the losing side as alliances were rapidly made and unmade. Adding to the crisis atmosphere was a wave of strikes and protests all across the country in both urban and rural areas as the unemployed demanded social reforms that would address the Great Depression. Despite his unpopularity with the Greek people, from August 1935 politicians began to openly visit the former King George II in his exile in London to assure him of their loyalty. On 8 October 1935 and 10 October 1935, the Foreign Minister Dimitros Maximos who was in Geneva attending a session of the League of Nations, telephoned George to tell him that Tsaldaris was preparing a National Council resolution calling for a constitutional monarchy.

In both telephone calls, Maximos asked George to publicly commit himself to obeying the National Council resolution asking him to behave strictly as a constitutional monarch who would uphold democracy and the rule of law. Both times George refused under the grounds that as a king he was above "procedures" and he would rule Greece whatever way he liked. On 10 October 1935, the "Thunder General" as Kondylis was known carried out a coup d'état in the name of a "revolutionary committee" that deposed Tsaldaris. On 3 November 1935, the monarchy was restored and George returned to Greece to reclaim his crown. The American Embassy in Athens reported that public opinion was firmly against the king, and that it would take a "miracle" for George to keep his throne again as he lacked any popular support.

== Prime Minister and the 4th of August Regime ==
EON's emblem.

After a heavily rigged plebiscite, King George II returned to take the throne in 1935. The extent of the voting fraud could be seen in that Crete, the homeland of Venizelos, an island that was well known for its republicanism, showed 50,655 votes for restoring the monarchy and only 1,276 votes for retaining the republic, a figure that was widely regarded at the time as laughable. On 11 December 1935, the king met with Ernst Eisenlohr, the German envoy in Athens, who in his account of the conversation reminded him that Germany was Greece's largest trading partner and that:

"the fact of a constant active balance in Greece's favor arising from the exchange of goods made it possible for Greece to obtain commodities from Germany which she could not purchase from other countries for lack of sufficient supplies of foreign exchange. In discussing economic changes, I endeavored to make clear to the King that Greece could not live without her German customers and that, in particular, a reduction or cessation of our purchases of tobacco must lead to the impoverishment of the Macedonian peasants and thus to grave disturbances in Greek domestic politics [emphasis in the original]. Careful fostering of these relationships (between Germany and Greece) was therefore as much a political as an economic imperative."

To stay favorable to the Reich, Eisenlohr told the king that he must "bind the armed forces to his person and thus provide himself with a reliable bulwark for his throne in the ever-changing currents of internal politics"; though Eisenlohr did not mention Metaxas by name, it is clear that he was the "reliable bulwark" that he wanted the king to rely upon. At the time, the Romanian foreign minister Nicolae Titulescu was seeking to link the Little Entente of Czechoslovakia, Romania and Yugoslavia together with the Balkan Pact of Yugoslavia, Romania, Greece and Turkey, which Eisenlohr vehemently objected to, saying he wanted the king to appoint as prime minister someone who was friendly towards Germany who would veto Titulescu's plan, which was aimed at building an alliance against Germany.

After the elections on 26 January 1936, Venizelists and anti-Venizelists could not form a government mainly on the question of the return of the democratic officers of the 1935 movement to the army. In 1936 elections, the Venizelists won 141 seats while the Populists loyal to Tsaldaris won 72 seats, another faction of the Populists loyal to Ioannis Theotokis won 38 seats, the followers of Kondylis won 12 seats and Metaxas's Eleftherophrones party won only 7 seats, making Metaxas in electoral terms the weakest of the right-wing leaders. The greatest surprise of the 1936 elections was the breakthrough of the Communist Party of Greece (KKE) which won 15 seats, settling off a hysterical reaction on the right that this presaged a Communist revolution as the fears were voiced that the great masses of the unemployed would rally to the KKE.

In 1935, the Comintern had ordered Communist parties around the world to engage in "popular fronts" against fascism, allying themselves with other left-wing parties. Following the Comintern's orders, the KKE declared itself in favor of a "popular front" to unite all left-wing parties against fascism, and called for an alliance with the Venizelists. Faced with a parliament evenly divided between left and right, the Liberals entered negotiations for Communist support for a Liberal government. The chief of the Army General Staff, General Alexandros Papagos, told the king that the Army would carry out an immediate coup d'état if the Liberals made an alliance with the KKE, saying he would never allow the Communists to form a government or have any role in the government.

Contrary to expectations, King George II had not taken sides in the 1936 election and remained neutral. The king had expected the Liberals to lose, and with the Venizelists forming the largest bloc in Parliament, he faced demands that the Venizelist officers dismissed in 1935 be restated, which led to warnings from the right-wing parties that the king risked being sent into exile again if any of the dismissed officers received their commissions again. There was considerable anger within right-wing circles at King George II for "stacking" the election in favor of the Venizelists, and the king's loyalist supporters were on the verge of turning against him. Tsaldaris wanted to compromise on the issue of the Venizelist officers, agreeing that some would have their commissions returned, but Theotokis was against any compromise, and thus it was a dispute between Tsaldaris and Theotokis as opposed to the dispute between the Venizelists and the anti-Venizelists that really paralyzed parliament.

Although Kondylis had been instrumental in restoring the monarchy in 1935, King George greatly distrusted him as he had not forgotten that it was Kondylis who had deposed and exiled him in 1924. King George II had often mused that if he was to play the role of King Victor Emmanuel III, he wanted his Mussolini to be a man who was loyal to the monarchy, which ruled out Kondylis and led the king to turn to Metaxas.

In a series of initiatives, King George II was able to play a decisive role in shaping the political scene. On 5 March, King George II appointed Metaxas the Minister of Defense, a post in which he would remain until his death in 1941. The political significance of this appointment was great since Metaxas was not only a dedicated Monarchist but one of the few politicians who had supported openly the imposition of an authoritarian, non-parliamentary regime in Greece.

On 14 March, the Demertzis government was sworn in, and Ioannis Metaxas was appointed vice-president of the government and Minister of Defense. Demertzis died suddenly on 13 April. That same day, the king appointed Metaxas Prime Minister. The very first action of Metaxas was to announce his opposition to Titulescu's plan, stating that he was opposed to Greece being allied with any non-Balkan power, which killed Titulescu's plan that required the unanimous approval of all Balkan Pact states. Following a failure by the Venizelists to come to an agreement with the anti-Venizelist parties, the Metaxas government secured a vote of confidence from the House of Parliament on 27 April with 241 votes in favor, 4 abstentions and 16 against. Three days later, the House of Parliament resolved and suspended its work for five months, authorizing the government to issue legislative decrees on all matters, with the agreement of a parliamentary committee which never operated. The appointment of Metaxas as prime minister caused a strike wave all across the country with Macedonia being the center of the protests and strikes. On 29 April 1936, the tobacco farmers of Macedonia went on a strike to protest his appointment and on 9 May a general strike began in Thessaloniki.

Widespread industrial unrest gave Metaxas justification to declare a state of emergency on 4 August 1936 with the excuse of the "communist danger". With the King's support, he adjourned parliament indefinitely and suspended various articles of the constitution guaranteeing civil liberties. In a national radio address, Metaxas declared that for the duration of the state of emergency, he would hold "all the power I need for saving Greece from the catastrophes which threaten her." The regime created as a result of this self-coup became known as the "4th of August Regime" after the date of its proclamation.

Greece since the 4th of August became an anticommunist State, an antiparliamentary State, a totalitarian State. A State based on its farmers and workers, and so antiplutocratic. There is not, of course, a particular party to govern. This party is all the People, except of the incorrigible communists and the reactionary old parties politicians.

— Ioannis Metaxas,

The regime's propaganda presented Metaxas as "the First Peasant", "the First Worker" and "the National Father" of the Greeks. Metaxas adopted the title of Arkhigos, Greek for "leader" or "chieftain", and claimed a "Third Hellenic Civilization", following ancient Greece and the Christian Byzantine Empire of the Middle Ages. State propaganda portrayed Metaxas as a "Saviour of the Nation", bringing unity to a divided country.

=== Internal policies ===
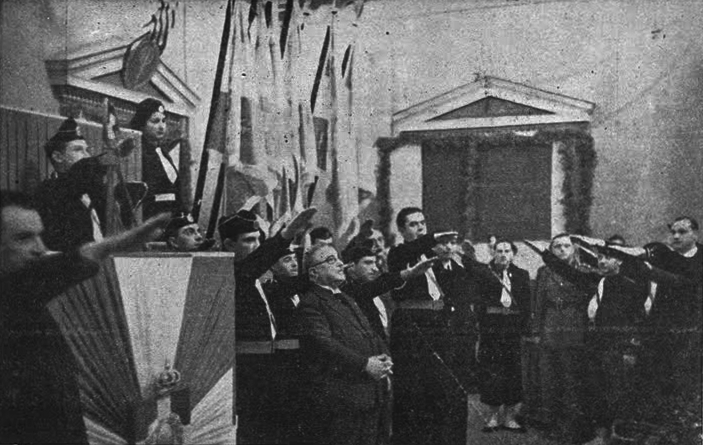
Members of the Greek National Organisation of Youth (EON) salute Ioannis Metaxas.

Patterning his regime on other authoritarian European governments of the day, Metaxas banned political parties (including his own), prohibited strikes and introduced widespread censorship of the media. National unity was to be achieved by the abolition of the previous political parliamentary system, which was seen as having left the country in chaos (see National Schism). Metaxas disliked the old parties of the political landscape, including traditional conservatives.

Along with anti-parliamentarism, anti-communism formed the second major political agenda of the 4th of August regime. Minister of Security Konstantinos Maniadakis quickly infiltrated and practically dissolved the Communist Party of Greece by seizing its archives and arresting Communist leader Nikos Zachariadis. Metaxas himself became Minister of Education in 1938 and had all school texts re-written to fit the regime's ideology.

Suppressing Communism was followed by a campaign against "anti-Greek" literature viewed as dangerous to the national interest. Book burnings targeted authors such as Johann Wolfgang von Goethe, George Bernard Shaw and Sigmund Freud, and several Greek writers. Arthur Koestler, who visited Athens in 1938, noted that even Plato's "Republic" was on Metaxas's list of prohibited books – which in Koestler's view made the Metaxas dictatorship "stupid as well as vicious". At that time Koestler met secretly with members of the underground opposition, hearing from them "horrifying stories of police brutality, especially the case of unspeakable torture inflicted on a young girl who was communist".

Wanting to build a corporatist state and secure popular support, Metaxas adopted or adapted many of the modernizing institutions being introduced elsewhere around the world: a National Labor Service, the eight-hour workday, mandatory improvements to working conditions, and the Social Insurance Institute (Greek: Ίδρυμα Κοινωνικών Ασφαλίσεων, IKA), still the biggest social security institution in Greece.

In terms of symbolism, the Roman salute and the Minoan double-axe, the labrys, were introduced. Unlike Mussolini, however, Metaxas lacked the support provided by a mass political party; indeed, he deliberately positioned himself as being above politics. The regime's only mass organization was the National Organisation of Youth (EON), whose literature and magazines were promoted in schools. Throughout his rule, Metaxas's power rested primarily upon the army and the support of King George II.

=== Foreign policy and the war with Italy ===
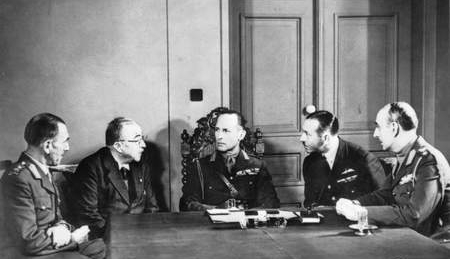
Ioannis Metaxas with George II of Greece and Alexandros Papagos during a meeting of the Anglo-Greek War Council.

It is often mistakenly believed that Metaxas followed a neutral stance in foreign policy by trying to balance between Britain and Germany or that he had a pro-German policy. As recent studies have proven, however, Greece under Metaxas remained a close ally of Britain, and he never intended to adopt a pro-Axis policy. Additionally, the foreign policy of the regime was mainly determined by George II of Greece, who had close ties with the British government.

Ever since the Corfu incident of 1923, the Greeks had regarded Italy as the principal enemy, and as long as Italy and Germany were divided by the Austrian Question, Metaxas saw Germany as a counterweight to Italy. The British historian D. C. Watt described Metaxas as living "in a paranoiac world" and as convinced that Britain was seeking his overthrow and seeing plots against him everywhere. The emergence of the "Rome-Berlin Axis" in 1936 greatly upset Metaxas's calculations and forced him to reevaluate Greece's foreign policy alignments, though he continued to hope for a while that Germany would restrain Italy in the Balkans. In the late 1930s, as with the other Balkan countries, Germany became Greece's largest trading partner.

To break the German dominance of the Balkans, the British agreed to launch an "economic offensive" into the Balkans in November 1938, but the question of whether Britain should buy the Greek tobacco crop led to much debate within the British government as objections were made that British smokers, accustomed to Canadian and American tobacco, should not have to smoke Greek tobacco. Metaxas himself had a reputation as a Germanophile dating back to his studies in Germany and his role in the National Schism. The regime's literature gave praise to fellow European authoritarian states, especially those of Francisco Franco, Benito Mussolini and Adolf Hitler. In October 1938, Metaxas asked Michael Palairet, the British minister in Athens, for an alliance out of the hope that the British would turn him down, as they did, which would justify Greek neutrality if another world war should break out.

However, events gradually drove Metaxas to lean toward France and Britain. King George and most of the country's elites were staunchly anglophile, and the predominance of the British Royal Navy in the Mediterranean could not be ignored by a maritime country such as Greece. Furthermore, the expansionist goals of Mussolini's Italy pushed Greece to lean towards the Franco-British alliance. On 4 April 1939, Italy annexed Albania and Mussolini had committed 20 divisions to occupy Albania, which was far more men than was necessary to occupy a small nation like Albania.

Metaxas became convinced that an Italian invasion of Greece was imminent. On 8 April 1939, Metaxas summoned Palairet for a meeting at midnight to tell him that Greece would fight to the death if Italy invaded, and he asked for British assistance. The fact that Germany had supported Italy's annexation of Albania showed Hitler was supporting Italian ambitions in the Balkans, which left Metaxas with no choice but to turn to Britain as a counterweight to Italy. On 13 April 1939, British Prime Minister Neville Chamberlain speaking in the House of Commons, and French Prime Minister Édouard Daladier speaking in the Chamber of Deputies, announced a joint Anglo-French guarantee of Romania and Greece. On the same day, Sir Hughe Knatchbull-Hugessen, the British ambassador in Turkey, asked the Turks to open staff talks with the Greeks so that they could come to Greece's aid in the event of an Italian invasion. Though Greece declared neutrality in September 1939, Metaxas's acceptance of the Anglo-French "guarantee" in April 1939 associated Greece with the Allies.

Regarding Turkey, Metaxas continued the policy of friendship and good relations, which had been started by Venizelos. The Italian presence and ambitions in the Aegean Sea left him with no other choice. On the day of Atatürk's death, Metaxas addressed a letter and speech of condolence.

Metaxas's efforts to keep Greece out of war came undone when Mussolini demanded occupation rights to strategic Greek sites. When Italian Ambassador Emanuele Grazzi visited Metaxas's residence and presented these demands on the night of 28 October 1940, Metaxas curtly replied in French (the language of diplomacy), Alors, c'est la guerre ("So it's war").

A popular story, promoted by Metaxas's widow Lela, was he simply told Grazzi Ochi!" ("No!") and the image of Metaxas shouting "ochi!" upon the presentation of the Italian ultimatum made the previously unpopular prime minister into a national hero. The single word "Ochi" and all it symbolizes has become iconic in Greek culture. In Nicosia, Cyprus, there is even an "Ochi Square," now the site of a popular regular farmer's market.

A few hours later, Italy invaded Greece from Albania and started the Greco-Italian War. The next day, Metaxas called for a private press conference. He stated to the journalists to be careful about the news during the war, that the Axis powers could not win the war and that Greece would be on the side of the winners. He said that until then, he followed a policy of neutrality (just like King Constantine during the First World War), but after the Italian attack on Greece, he has to follow the policy of Venizelos.

The Hellenic Army mounted a successful defense and a subsequent counteroffensive which forced the Italians back, occupying large parts of southern Albania, which was usually referred to by the Greeks as "Northern Epirus". In April 1941, Germany invaded Greece to help Italy.

== Death and legacy ==
Metaxas never saw the joint Italian-German invasion of Greece during the Battle of Greece because of his death at his home in Kifissia, on 29 January 1941, at age 69, from what has been described, variously, as throat cancer or an abscess of the throat or a pharyngeal phlegmon which subsequently led to incurable toxaemia. The Greeks, however, continue to celebrate the Ohi Day on 28 October in memory of his refusal of the Italian ultimatum on that day in 1940.

He was succeeded by Alexandros Koryzis. After the death of Metaxas, the invading forces had to take into account the fortifications constructed by Metaxas in Northern Greece. These fortifications were constructed along the Bulgarian border and were known as the Metaxas Line. Until the Greek military junta of 1967–1974, Metaxas was honored as a patriot and leader of the war against Italy. During the junta, with the exception of a small number of supporters of his regime (namely the banned "4th of August" organization) and few members of the government, no major projects honoring Metaxas were undertaken. Some busts of Metaxas were put up in small towns and the periphery of Athens, mostly after local initiatives.

An idea of erecting a Metaxas statue in central Athens was not accepted by the government and Georgios Papadopoulos, who preferred to identify with Eleftherios Venizelos instead, inaugurated in Athens a large statue of the latter. In the last years of junta, some minor local officials of the regime, disappointed by the liberalization steps planned by Papadopoulos, erected busts of Metaxas in some towns, in order to upset Papadopoulos. In the meantime, during and shortly after the dictatorship, ideological connection between the 1967 junta and the Metaxas regime and fascism was publicised, by means of books and works of art, such as the books of Spyros Linardatos on the 4th of August regime (1965 and 1966) and the film Days of '36 by Theo Angelopoulos. This concept was adopted by the antidictatorial struggle and had a profound impact on subsequent historical production. A resistance group blew up a bust of Metaxas in a Piraeus suburb in 1972. The concept became mainstream after 1974.

The microhistory of Metaxas's statues is examined by Kouki K. and Antoniou D. in a study on the construction of an ideological commonality between Metaxas, the 1967 junta and fascism in modern Greek history.

== See also ==
- Metaxism

== Sources ==
- Επίτομη ιστορία της συμμετοχής του Ελληνικού Στρατού στον Πρώτο Παγκόσμιο Πόλεμο 1914–1918 [Concise History of the Hellenic Army's Participation in the First World War 1914–1918] (in Greek). Athens: Hellenic Army History Directorate. 1993.
- Συνοπτική Ιστορία του Γενικού Επιτελείου Στρατού 1901–2001 [A Concise History of the Hellenic Army General Staff 1901–2001] (in Greek). Athens: Hellenic Army History Directorate. 2001. ISBN 960-7897-44-7.
- Brewer, David (2016). Greece, the Decade of War: Occupation, Resistance and Civil War. Bloomsbury Publishing. ISBN 978-0-85772-732-9.
- Cliadakis, Harry (January 1979). "The Political and Diplomatic Background to the Metaxas Dictatorship, 1935–36". Journal of Contemporary History. 14 (1): 117–138. doi:10.1177/002200947901400106. S2CID 154407972.
- Papacomsa, Victor (2007). "Ioannis Metaxas and the Fourth of August Dictatorship in Greece". In Bernd Jürgen Fischer (ed.). Balkan Strongmen: Dictators and Authoritarian Rulers of South Eastern Europe. West Lafayette: Purdue University Press. pp. 165–199.
- Pelt, Mogens (Winter 2001). "The Establishment and Development of the Metaxas Dictatorship in the Context of Fascism and Nazism, 1936–41". Totalitarian Movements and Political Religions. 2 (3): 143–172. doi:10.1080/714005461. S2CID 143930737.
- Joachim, Joachim G. Ioannis Metaxas: The Formative Years 1871–1922, Verlag Franz Philipp Rutzen, ISBN 978-3-941336-03-2
- Watt, Donald Cameron (1989). How War Came: The Immediate Origins of the Second World War, 1938–1939. Pimlico. ISBN 978-0-7126-6713-5.

Political offices
Preceded by Konstantinos Demertzis	Prime Minister of Greece; 13 April 1936 – 29 January 1941	Succeeded by Alexandros Koryzis
