= Conservative Democratic Party (Greece) =

Political party in Greece

The Conservative Democratic Party (Greek: Κόμμα Συντηρητικών Δημοκρατικών) was a political party in Greece in the 1920s and 1930s led by Andreas Michalakopoulos. The party was created in 1924 after Michalakopoulos split from the Liberal Party. It represented the conservative wing of the Liberals, in contrast to Alexandros Papanastasiou's Democratic Union, which represented the progressive wing.

== History ==
The party first contested national elections in 1928, winning five seats in the parliamentary elections with 1.6% of the vote. The party also won five seats in the Senate elections the following year.

The 1932 elections saw the party lose all its seats in both the Vouli and the Senate. Although it regained two seats in the Vouli in the 1933 elections, the party did not contest any further elections.
