= 1933 Greek parliamentary election =

← 1932	5 March 1933	1935 →

All 248 seats in the Vouli 125 seats needed for a majority
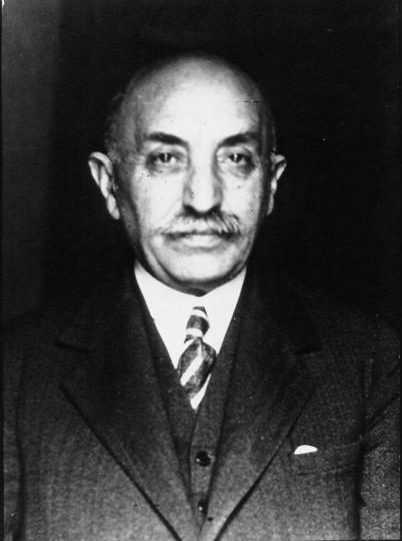

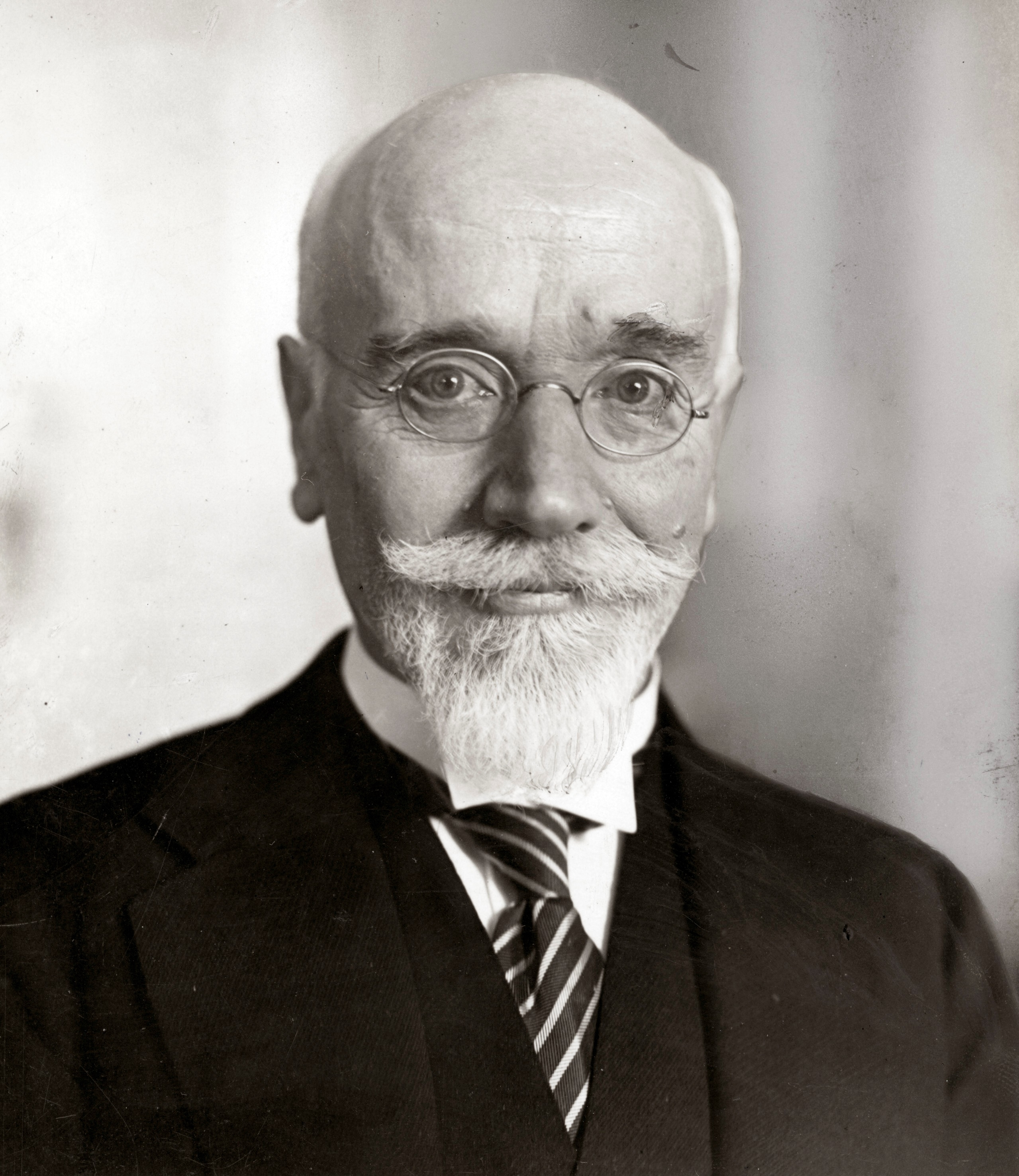

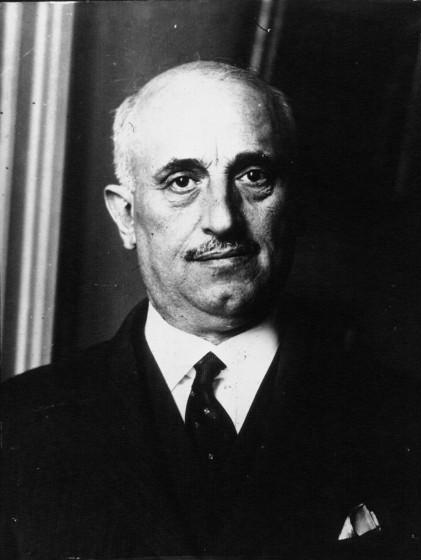

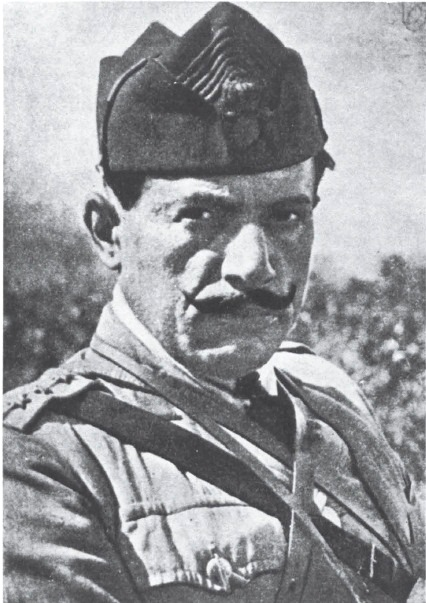

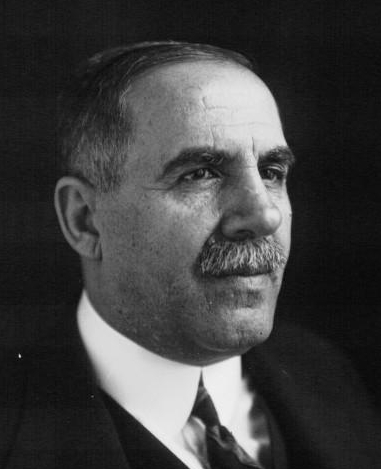

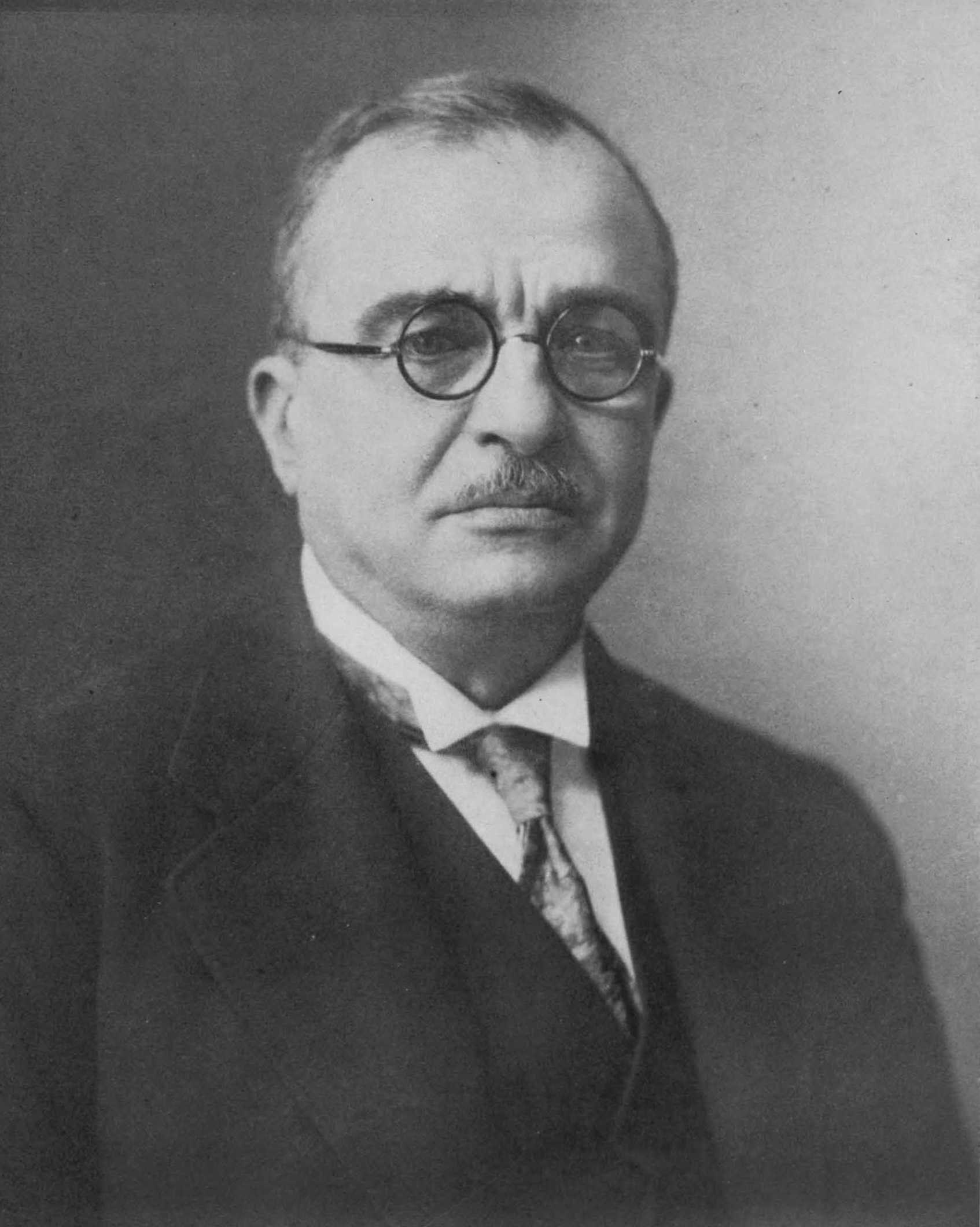
	First party	Second party	Third party
Leader	Panagis Tsaldaris	Eleftherios Venizelos	Alexandros Papanastasiou
Party	People's Party	Liberal	AEK
Last election	33.80%, 95 seats	33.42%, 98 seats	5.89%, 8 seats
Seats won	118	80	13
Seat change	▲23	▼18	▲5
Popular vote	434,550	379,968	47,460
Percentage	38.07%	33.29%	4.16%
Swing	▲4.27 pp	▼0.13 pp	▼1.73 pp
	Fourth party	Fifth party	Sixth party
Leader	Georgios Kondylis	Georgios Kafantaris	Ioannis Metaxas
Party	ERK	Progressive	KE
Last election	4.07%, 5 seats	8.35%, 14 seats	1.59%, 2 seats
Seats won	11	10	6
Seat change	▲6	▼4	▲4
Popular vote	46,692	77,254	25,758
Percentage	4.09%	6.77%	2.26%
Swing	▲0.02 pp	▼1.57 pp	▲0.67 pp
Prime Minister before election
Eleftherios Venizelos
Liberal
Prime Minister after election
Panagis Tsaldaris
People's Party

Parliamentary elections were held in Greece on 5 March 1933. The pro-monarchist People's Party emerged as the largest party, winning 118 of the 248 seats in Parliament, ending the predominance of Eleftherios Venizelos' Liberal Party. The results triggered an attempted coup by Venizelist officers. A military emergency government under Alexandros Othonaios was instituted which suppressed the revolt, and was succeeded by a People's Party cabinet under Panagis Tsaldaris on 10 March.

== Results ==
Party	Votes	%	Seats	+/–
People's Party	434,550	38.07	118	+23
Liberal Party	379,968	33.29	80	–18
Progressive Party	77,254	6.77	10	–4
Communist Party of Greece	52,958	4.64	0	–13
Agricultural and Labour Party	47,460	4.16	13	+5
National Radical Party	46,692	4.09	11	+6
Freethinkers' Party	25,758	2.26	6	+4
Independent Party	22,985	2.01	2	New
Farmers' Party	20,200	1.77	1	–12
National Alliance	14,302	1.25	5	New
Conservative Democratic Party	9,672	0.85	2	+2
Independents	9,532	0.84	0	0
Total	1,141,331	100.00	248	–2
Valid votes	1,141,331	99.51		
Invalid/blank votes	5,612	0.49		
Total votes	1,146,943	100.00		
Source: Nohlen & Stöver
