= Independent Party (Greece) =

Political party in Greece

The Independent Party was a political party in Greece in the 1930s.

== History ==
The party first contested national elections in 1933, winning two seats in the Hellenic Parliament with 2% of the vote. The party did not contest any further national elections.
