= National Alliance (Greece) =

Political party in Greece in the 1930s

The National Alliance (Greek: Εθνική Συμμαχία) was a political party in Greece in the 1930s.

== History ==
The party first contested national elections in 1933, winning five seats in the parliamentary elections that year, despite receiving just 1.3% of the vote.

Despite its success, the party did not contest any further elections.
