= 1929 Greek Senate election =

Senate elections were held in Greece on 21 April 1929. The Senate was a new institution introduced with the Greek Constitution of 1927 and these were the first elections for it. The result was a victory for the Liberal Party, which won 64 of the 92 directly elected seats. It was regarded as a public approval of the policies of Prime Minister Eleftherios Venizelos.

== Results ==
Party	Votes	%	Seats
Liberal Party	450,624	54.45	64
People's Party	157,304	19.01	10
Agricultural and Labour Party	54,337	6.57	4
Independent Royal Supporters	35,344	4.27	0
Progressive Party	34,712	4.19	3
Conservative Democratic Party	23,171	2.80	5
Freethinkers' Party	22,518	2.72	2
Farmers' Party	13,720	1.66	2
United Front	14,069	1.70	0
Independent Democrats	9,884	1.19	0
Progressive Union	9,807	1.18	2
Independents	165	0.02	0
Industry representatives	1,676	0.20	18
Elected by the Vouli	268	0.03	10
Total	827,599	100.00	120
Valid votes	827,599	98.66	
Invalid/blank votes	11,266	1.34	
Total votes	838,865	100.00	
Source: Hellenic Parliament
