= Progressive Union (Greece) =

Greek political party

The Progressive Union (Greek: Κόμμα Προοδευτικής Ενώσεως) was a political party in Greece in the 1920s and 1930s.

== History ==
The party first contested national elections in 1928, winning five seats in the parliamentary elections with 1.3% of the vote. In the Senate elections the following year the party won two seats, but did not contest any further elections.
