= Progressive Party (Greece, Kafantaris) =

Progressive Party Προοδευτικόν Κόμμα
- Leader: Georgios Kafantaris
- Founder: Georgios Kafantaris
- Founded: May 25, 1928
- Dissolved: August 1946
- Split from: Liberal Party
- Headquarters: Athens, Greece
- Political position: Centre-left

The Progressive Party (Greek: Προοδευτικόν Κόμμα) was a political party in Greece in the 1920s and 1930s led by Georgios Kafantaris.

== History ==
The party first contested national elections in 1928, when they won three seats in the parliamentary elections with 2.5% of the national vote. In the Senate elections the following year the party received 4.2% of the vote, winning three seats.

The 1932 elections saw the party win 14 seats in the Vouli and one in the Senate, making it the third-largest faction in the Hellenic Parliament after the People's Party and the Liberal Party. In the 1933 elections the party lost four seats in the Vouli, and despite receiving the third highest vote tally, were reduced to being the fifth largest party.

After 1933 the party did not contest any further national elections.
