= 1928 Greek parliamentary election =

- 19 August 1928

All 250 seats in the Hellenic Parliament 126 seats needed for a majority
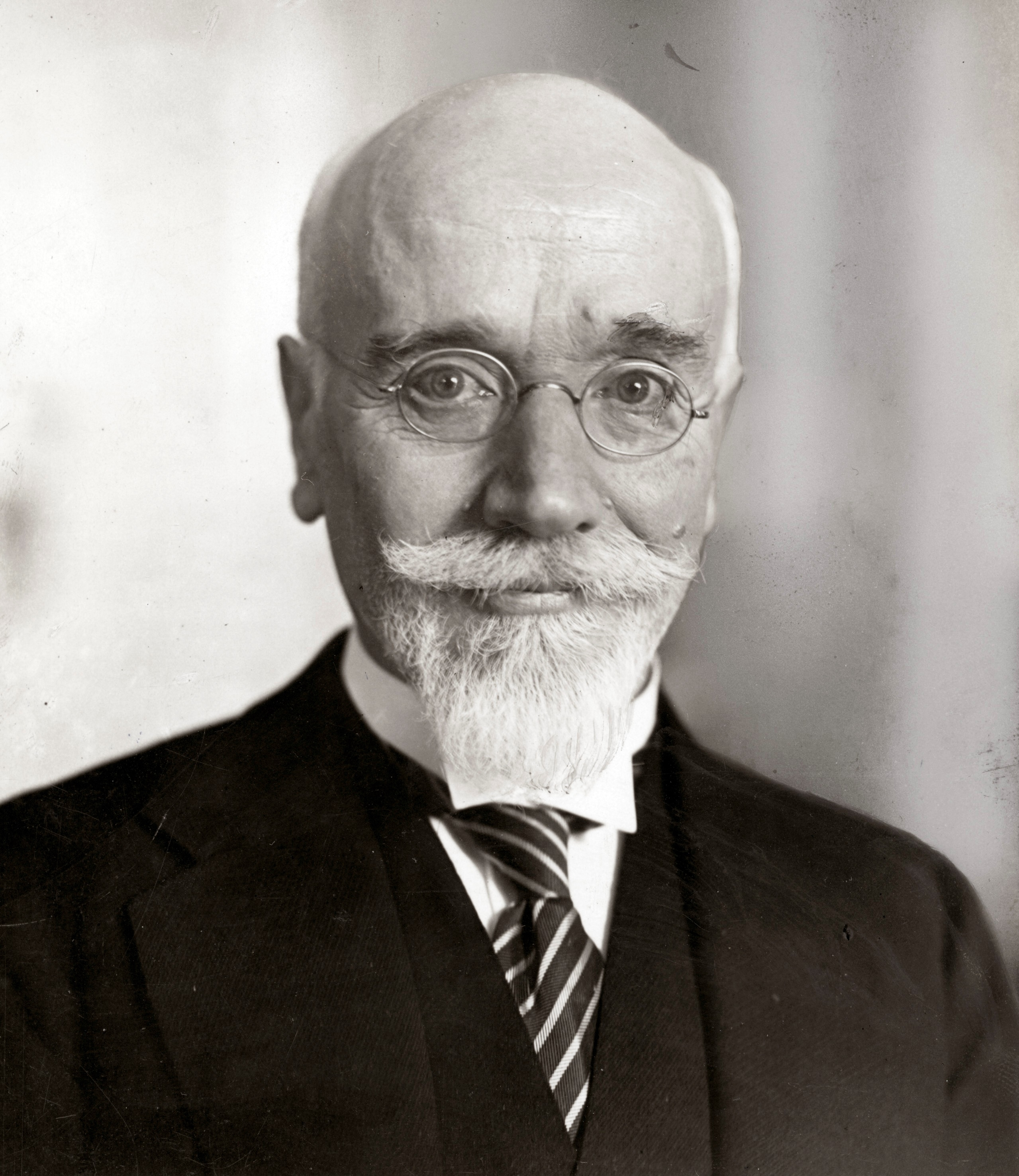

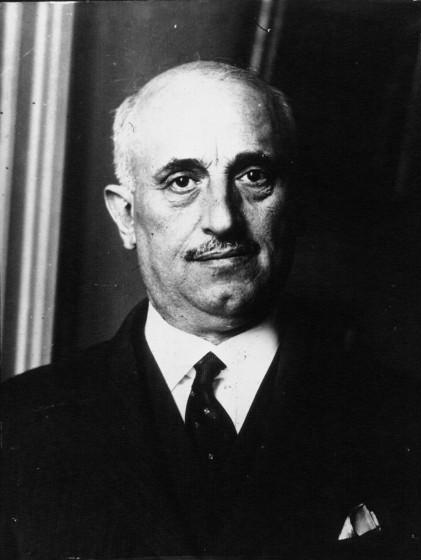

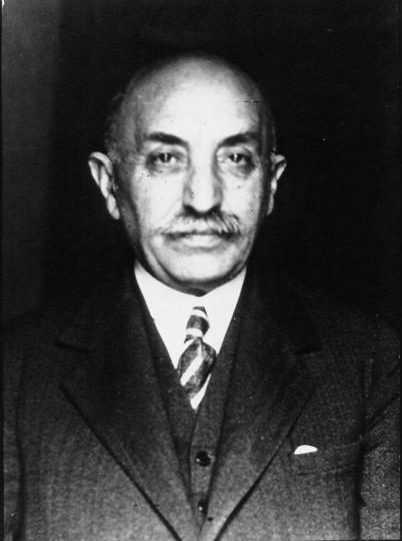

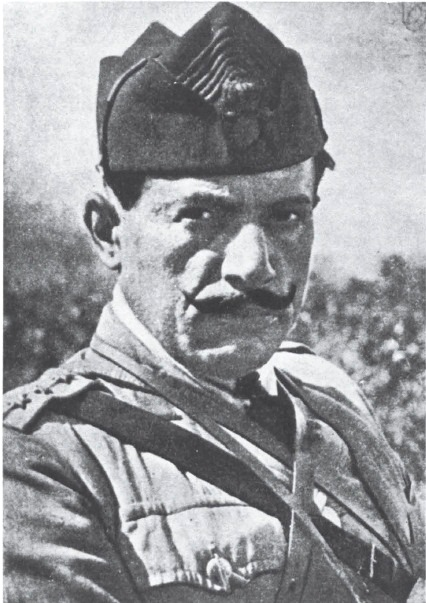

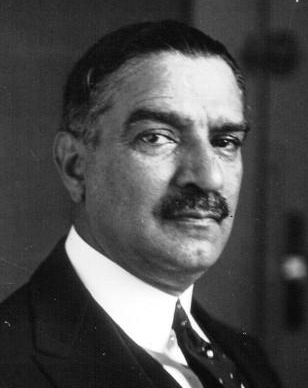
	First party	Second party	Third party
Leader	Eleftherios Venizelos	Alexandros Papanastasiou	Panagis Tsaldaris
Party	Liberal	DE	People's Party
Last election	108 seats	17 seats	60 seats
Seats won	178	20	19
Seat change	▲70	▲3	▼41
Popular vote	477,502	68,278	243,543
Percentage	46.94%	6.71%	23.49%
	Fourth party	Fifth party	Sixth party
Leader	Georgios Kondylis		Andreas Michalakopoulos
Party	EDK	AD	KSD
Last election	–	3 seats	3 seats
Seats won	9	6	5
Seat change	New	▲3	▲2
Popular vote	27,603	18,069	15,852
Percentage	2.71%	1.78%	1.56%
Swing		▲1.13%
Prime Minister before election
Eleftherios Venizelos
Liberal
Prime Minister after election
Eleftherios Venizelos
Liberal

Parliamentary elections were held in Greece on 19 August 1928. The result was a victory for the Liberal Party, which won 178 of the 250 seats.

== Background ==
The Venizelists entered the elections as a coalition of five "parties of the liberals" under the leadership of Eleftherios Venizelos. These parties were the Democratic Union (later the Agricultural and Labour Party) under the leadership of Alexandros Papanastasiou, the National Democratic Party led by Georgios Kondylis, the Conservative Democratic Party under Andreas Michalakopoulos and the Progressive Union under the leadership of Konstantinos Zavitsanos. Because he wanted to follow an independent line from Venizelos, Georgios Kafantaris together with some personal friends and various dissatisfied liberals founded the Progressive Party.

The anti-Venizelist movement went into the elections divided as the People's Party, the Freethinkers' Party and a few independent royalists who put themselves up for election. The former dictator, Theodoros Pangalos, stood for election in Athens as chief of the National Union. In addition there were a large number of unaligned and independent candidates. Finally, the Communist Party of Greece entered the elections as the United Front.

== Results ==
Party	Votes	%	Seats	+/–
Liberal Party	477,502	46.94	178	+70
People's Party	243,543	23.94	19	–41
Agricultural and Labour Party	68,278	6.71	20	New
Freethinkers' Party	53,958	5.30	1	–51
Independent Royal Supporters	38,556	3.79	4	New
National Democratic Party	27,603	2.71	9	New
Progressive Party	25,729	2.53	3	New
Independent Democrats	18,069	1.78	6	New
Farmers' Party	17,042	1.68	0	New
Conservative Democratic Party	15,852	1.56	5	New
United Front	14,352	1.41	0	New
Progressive Union	13,452	1.32	5	New
National Union of Greece	1,958	0.19	0	New
Independents	1,387	0.14	0	New
Total	1,017,281	100.00	250	–36
Valid votes	1,017,281	99.59		
Invalid/blank votes	4,153	0.41		
Total votes	1,021,434	100.00		
Source: Nohlen & Stöver
