= 1932 Greek parliamentary election =

- Chamber of Deputies
← 1928	25 September 1932	1933 →

All 250 seats in the Vouli 126 seats needed for a majority
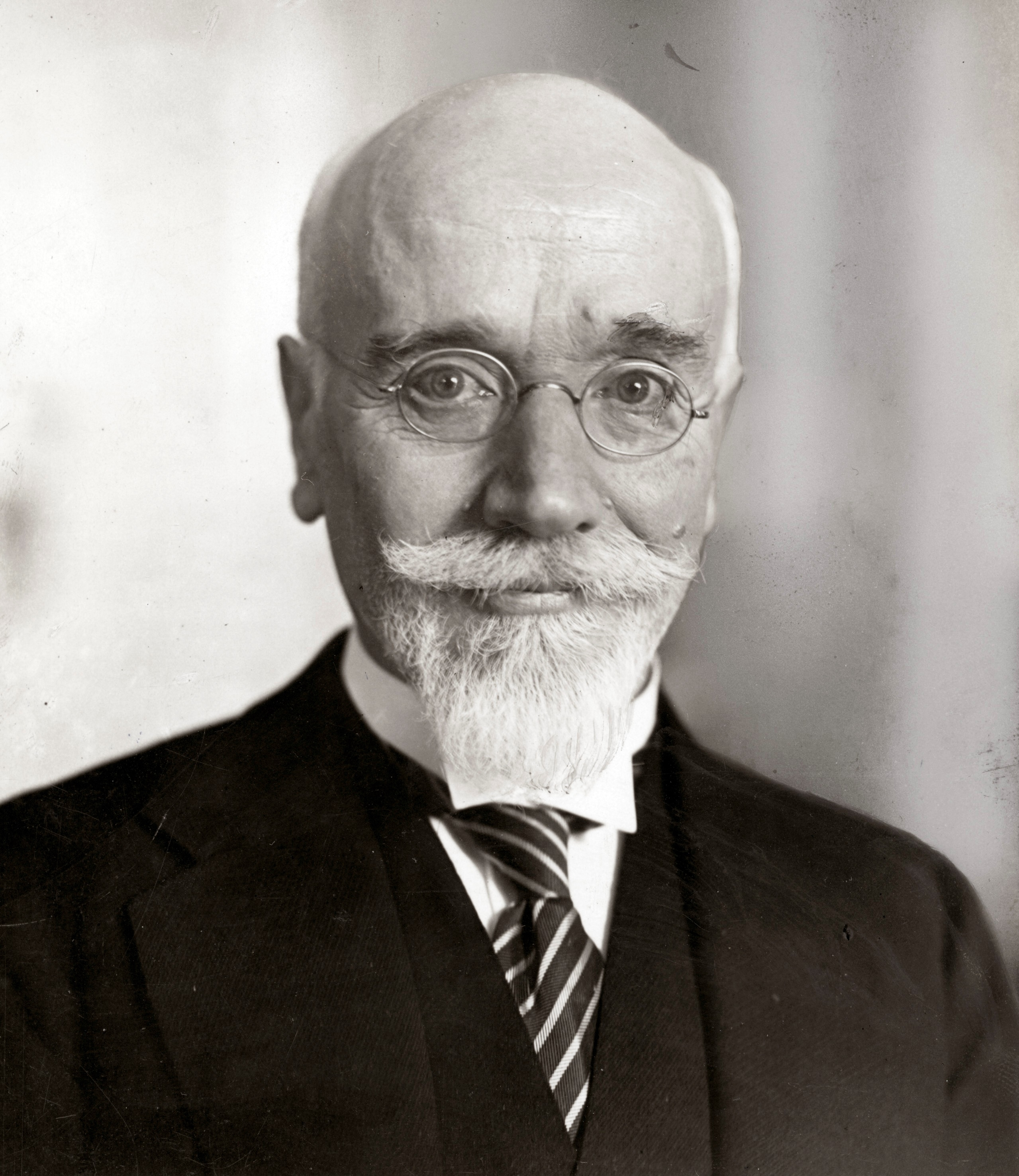

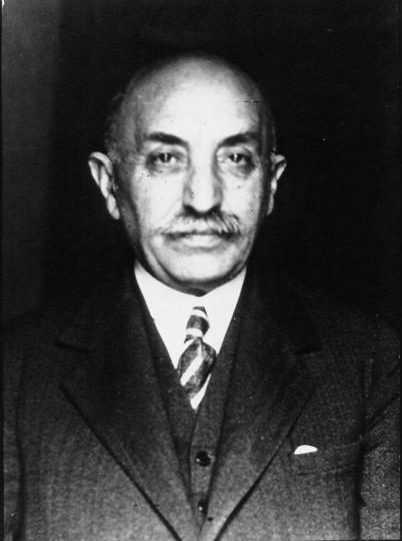

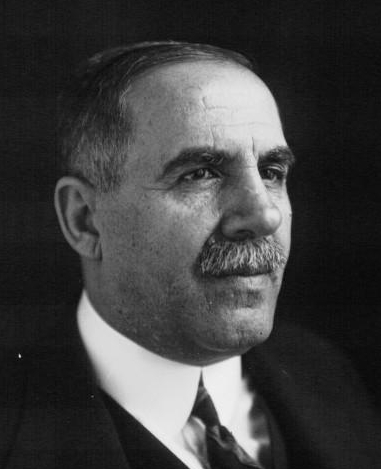

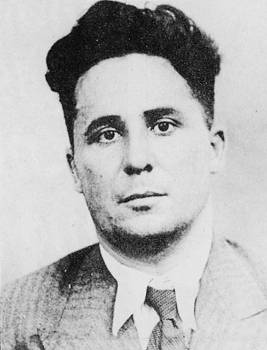

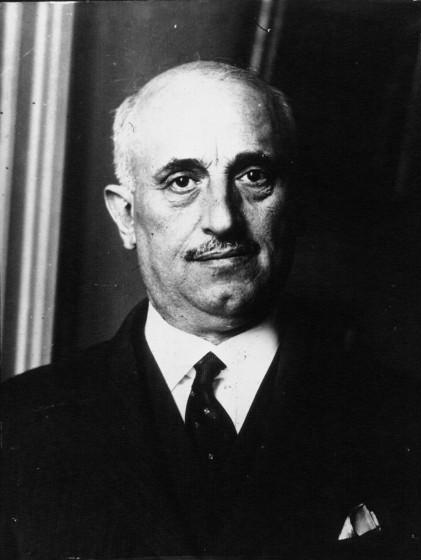
	First party	Second party	Third party
Leader	Eleftherios Venizelos	Panagis Tsaldaris	Georgios Kafantaris
Party	Liberal	People's Party	Progressive
Last election	46.94%, 178 seats	23.94%, 19 seats	2.53%, 3 seats
Seats won	98	95	14
Seat change	▼80	▲76	▲11
Popular vote	391,521	395,974	97,836
Percentage	33.42%	33.80%	8.35%
Swing	▼13.52 pp	▲9.86 pp	▲5.83 pp
	Fourth party	Fifth party	Sixth party
Leader		Nikos Zachariadis	Alexandros Papanastasiou
Party	Farmers'	KKE	AEK
Last election	1.68%, 0 seats	1.41%, 0 seats	6.71%, 20 seats
Seats won	13	13	8
Seat change	▲13	▲13	▼12
Popular vote	72,311	58,223	69,057
Percentage	6.17%	4.97%	5.89%
Swing	▲4.49 pp	▲3.56 pp	▼0.82 pp
Prime Minister before election
Eleftherios Venizelos
Liberal
Prime Minister after election
Eleftherios Venizelos
Liberal

Parliamentary elections were held in Greece on 25 September 1932. All 250 seats in the Lower House of the Greek Parliament, the Chamber of Deputies, were elected, as well as one-third of the seats in the Senate. The outcome was an ambivalent result for the two biggest parties, the Liberal Party of Eleftherios Venizelos and the People's Party. The People's Party received a plurality of votes in the Chamber of Deputies elections, but won fewer seats than the Liberal Party. The Liberals also won the most seats in the Senate.

These were the last elections for the Senate, as it was abolished in 1935.

== Results ==
=== Chamber of Deputies ===
Party	Votes	%	Seats	+/–
People's Party	395,974	33.80	95	+76
Liberal Party	391,521	33.42	98	–80
Progressive Party	97,836	8.35	14	+11
Farmers' Party	72,311	6.17	13	+13
Agricultural and Labour Party	69,057	5.89	8	–12
United Front	58,223	4.97	13	+13
National Radical Party	47,698	4.07	5	–4
Freethinkers' Party	18,591	1.59	2	+1
Conservative Democratic Party	11,494	0.98	0	–5
Socialist Party	849	0.07	0	New
Independents	8,083	0.69	2	+2
Total	1,171,637	100.00	250	0
Valid votes	1,171,637	99.63		
Invalid/blank votes	4,346	0.37		
Total votes	1,175,983	100.00		
Source: Nohlen & Stöver, Rokkan & Meyriat

=== Senate ===
Party	Votes	%	Seats
Liberal Party	142,575	39.46	16
People's Party	117,452	32.51	13
Progressive Party	32,822	9.08	1
Farmers' Party	29,000	8.03	0
United Front	14,143	3.91	0
Agricultural and Labour Party	12,376	3.43	0
National Radical Party	10,409	2.88	0
Independents	2,534	0.70	0
Total	361,311	100.00	30
Valid votes	361,311	96.49	
Invalid/blank votes	13,158	3.51	
Total votes	374,469	100.00	
Source: Nohlen & Stöver
