= National Democratic Party (Greece) =

National Democratic Party Εθνικόν Δημοκρατικόν Κόμμα
- Leader: Georgios Kondylis
- Dissolved: 1936
- Headquarters: Athens
- National affiliation: General Popular Radical Union (1936)

The National Democratic Party (Greek: Εθνικόν Δημοκρατικόν Κόμμα), later renamed National Radical Party (Greek: Εθνικόν Ριζοσπαστικόν Κόμμα), was a political party in Greece in the 1920s led by Georgios Kondylis.

== History ==
The party first contested national elections in 1928, when they won nine seats in the parliamentary elections with 2.7% of the vote.

The party contested the 1932 parliamentary elections as the National Radical Party, winning five seats in the Vouli with 4.1% of the vote. In the elections the following year the party won eleven seats, becoming the fourth-largest faction in the Hellenic Parliament.

For the 1935 elections the party allied with the People's Party. Due to a boycott by the Venizelist parties, the alliance won 287 of the 300 seats, of which the National Radical Party took 33. For the 1936 elections the party joined the General Popular Radical Union alongside the National People's Party and Independent People's Party, together winning 60 seats.

It was dissolved later in 1936 after the start of the 4th of August Regime, when political parties were banned.
