= Freethinkers' Party =

Freethinkers' Party Κόμμα των Ελευθεροφρόνων
- Leader: Ioannis Metaxas
- Founded: November 1922
- Dissolved: 4 August 1936
- Split from: People's Party
- Headquarters: Athens
- Newspaper: Nea Imera
- Ideology: Metaxism; Greek nationalism National conservatism Fascism; Agrarianism; Monarchism
- Political position: Far-right
- Religion: Greek Orthodox
- Colours: Blue, white

Party flag

The Freethinkers' Party or Free Opinion Party (Greek: Κόμμα των Ελευθεροφρόνων) was a Greek nationalist and monarchist party founded and led by Ioannis Metaxas who was the Prime Minister and dictator of Greece from 1936 to 1941. It was formally founded in November 1922 after the adoption of the party's manifesto that was unveiled on 13 October 1922. Metaxas had the party and all other parties dissolved following the establishment of the 4th of August Regime, in which he ruled as an official independent.

The first programmatic declaration of the party was published in the daily Nea Imera on 13 October 1922.

== Election results ==
=== General elections ===
| Election | Votes | % | Seats |
|---|---|---|---|
| 1926 | 151,660 | 15.78 | 52 / 286 |
| 1928 | 53,958 | 5.3 | 1 / 250 |
| 1932 | 18,591 | 1.59 | 3 / 254 |
| 1933 | 25,758 | 2.3 | 6 / 248 |
| 1936 | 50,137 | 3.9 | 7 / 300 |

=== Senate elections ===
| Election | Votes | % | Seats |
|---|---|---|---|
| 1929 | 22,518 | 2.73 | 2 / 92 |
