= Agricultural and Labour Party =

Former Greek political party

Democratic Union-Agricultural and Labour Party Δημοκρατική Ένωσις-Αγροτικόν Εργατικόν Κόμμα
- Founder: Alexandros Papanastasiou
- Founded: 1929
- Dissolved: 1936
- Preceded by: Democratic Union
- Ideology: Republicanism; Agrarianism; Social democracy Radicalism
- Political position: Center to Centre-left
- International affiliation: Radical International

The Agricultural and Labour Party (Greek: Αγροτικόν Εργατικόν Κόμμα, ΑΕΚ; AEK) was a Greek political party. The party was the successor of the Democratic Union of Alexandros Papanastasiou, via its renaming.

The party ran in the 1928 Greek legislative election under the name "Democratic Union-Agricultural and Labour Party". It gained 6.7%, elected 20 MPs and participated in the government of the Liberals. In the 1929 Greek Senate election, the party gained 6.6% and elected 4 MPs. In the 1932 Greek legislative election, the party lost most of its power and gained 5.9% and elected 8 MPs. In the 1933 Greek legislative election, it gained 4.2% and elected 13 MPs. Finally, in the 1936 Greek legislative election, the party participated in the Democratic Coalition, a coalition of centre-left parties, and elected 7 MPs. After the death of its leader, Alexandros Papanastasiou, the party was dissolved.
