= Georgios Kafantaris =

Greek politician (1873–1946)

- Γεώργιος Καφαντάρης
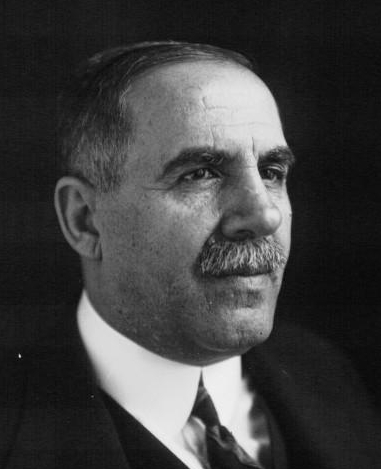
- Georgios Kafantaris in 1927

Prime Minister of Greece
- In office 6 February 1924 – 12 March 1924
- Monarch: George II
- Regent: Pavlos Kountouriotis
- Preceded by: Eleftherios Venizelos
- Succeeded by: Alexandros Papanastasiou

Personal details
- Born: 13 October 1873 Anatoliki Fragkista, Evrytania, Greece
- Died: 28 August 1946 (aged 72)
- Party: Liberal

Georgios Kafantaris (Greek: Γεώργιος Καφαντάρης; 13 October 1873 – 28 August 1946) was a Greek politician, a political personality of the first half of the 20th century and a prominent member of the Liberal Party.

== Biography ==
Georgios Kafantaris was born in Anatoliki Fragkista, Evrytania, on 13 October 1873. He studied law in Athens and practiced law in Missolonghi and Karpenisi. He was first elected as a member of parliament in 1905, and served as Minister of the Interior in Venizelos' short-lived government in 1915. He stood firmly on his side during the National Schism.

On 9 January 1919, Kafantaris joined the Cabinet of Greece under Prime Minister of Greece Eleftherios Venizelos as Minister of Agriculture. During his ministry he made deep breakthroughs in agricultural policy and successfully handled the issue of land distribution to landless peasants.

In 1920, after the unexpected defeat of the Liberals in the November elections, Kafantaris went abroad, from where he returned in September 1922, after the Asia Minor tragedy and the 1922 Greek coup.

In 1924, Kafantaris was appointed Minister of Justice. On 19 February 1924, Eleftherios Venizelos resigned for health reasons and nominated Kafantaris as his successor. Kafantaris served as Prime Minister for almost a month and then resigned himself on 12 March 1924. He was succeeded by Alexandros Papanastasiou.

In 1928 left the Liberal Party and found the Progressive Party. In the governments formed by Alexandros Zaimis in 1926-1928, Kafantaris served as Minister of Finance (during his ministry, in 1928, the Bank of Greece was established). In 1933 he took over the portfolio of the Ministry of Finance in the last Venizelos government.

Under 4th of August Regime, Kafantaris was deported to Zakynthos because of his anti-regime activities, and remained there for three years, until the death of Ioannis Metaxas.

After the end of World War II, he fought in vain for national reconciliation and clashed with Georgios Papandreou, whom he held responsible for the Dekemvriana.

The last office with which Kafantaris was honoured was that of vice-president in the government formed by Themistoklis Sofoulis in November 1945.

Georgios Kafantaris died on 28 August 1946, a few days before the referendum of 1 September 1946, which led to the restoration of the monarchy and the return of George II to the Greek throne.

Political offices
Preceded by Eleftherios Venizelos	Prime Minister of Greece; 6 February 1924 – 12 March 1924	Succeeded by Alexandros Papanastasiou
