= Georgios Kondylis =

Greek politician and general (1879–1936)

- Γεώργιος Κονδύλης
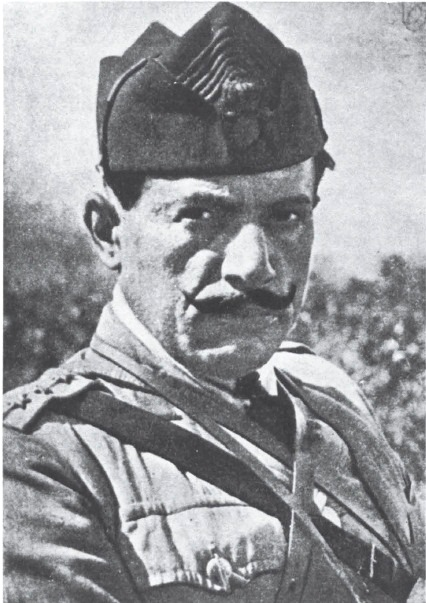
- Georgios Kondylis, c. 1919

Regent of Greece
- In office 10 October 1935 – 25 November 1935
- Prime Minister: Himself
- Preceded by: Alexandros Zaimis (as President of Greece)
- Succeeded by: George II (as King of the Hellenes)

Prime Minister of Greece
- In office 10 October 1935 – 30 November 1935
- Monarch: George II (from Nov 1935)
- Regent: Himself (until Nov 1935)
- Preceded by: Panagis Tsaldaris
- Succeeded by: Konstantinos Demertzis
- In office 23 August 1926 – 4 December 1926
- President: Pavlos Kountouriotis
- Preceded by: Athanasios Eftaxias
- Succeeded by: Alexandros Zaimis

Deputy Prime Minister of Greece
- In office 5 April 1935 – 10 October 1935
- Prime Minister: Panagis Tsaldaris
- Preceded by: Andreas Michalakopoulos
- Succeeded by: Ioannis Theotokis

Minister of Naval Affairs
- In office 10 October 1935 – 16 October 1935
- Prime Minister: Himself
- Preceded by: Sofoklis Dousmanis
- Succeeded by: Georgios D. Rallis
- In office 26 August 1926 – 4 December 1926
- Prime Minister: Himself
- Preceded by: Ioannis Leonidas
- Succeeded by: Alexandros Kanaris

Minister of Military Affairs
- In office 10 March 1933 – 10 October 1935
- Prime Minister: Panagis Tsaldaris
- Preceded by: Alexandros Othonaios
- Succeeded by: Alexandros Papagos
- In office 4 November 1932 – 16 January 1933
- Prime Minister: Panagis Tsaldaris
- Preceded by: Theodoros Chavinis
- Succeeded by: Georgios Katechakis
- In office 26 August 1926 – 4 December 1926
- Prime Minister: Himself
- Preceded by: Charalambos Tseroulis
- Succeeded by: Alexandros Mazarakis-Ainian
- In office 12 March 1924 – 9 June 1924
- Prime Minister: Alexandros Papanastasiou
- Preceded by: Konstantinos Gondikas
- Succeeded by: Theodoros Pangalos

Minister of the Interior
- In office 7 October 1924 – 15 June 1925
- Prime Minister: Andreas Michalakopoulos
- Preceded by: Georgios Roussos
- Succeeded by: Georgios Maris

Personal details
- Born: 14 August 1878 Proussos, Kingdom of Greece
- Died: 1 February 1936 (aged 57) Athens, Kingdom of Greece
- Party: National Democratic Party
- Awards: Order of the Redeemer; Order of George I War Cross; Medal of Military Merit; Legion of Honour; Croix de Guerre; Distinguished Service Order; Order of the White Eagle; Medal for Bravery
- Nickname(s): Thunder; Κεραυνός

Military service
- Allegiance: Kingdom of Greece
- Branch/service: Hellenic Army
- Years of service: 1896–1923
- Rank: Lieutenant General
- Battles/wars: Greco-Turkish War (1897); Cretan Revolt (1897–1898); Macedonian Struggle; Balkan Wars; First Balkan War; Battle of Sarantaporo; Battle of Yenidje; Second Balkan War; Battle of Kilkis-Lachanas; Battle of Kresna Gorge; World War I; Macedonian front; Battle of Skra-di-Legen; Russian Civil War; Allied intervention in the Russian Civil War; Southern Front; Southern Russia Intervention; Soviet invasion of Ukraine; Greco-Turkish War (1919–1922); Leonardopoulos–Gargalidis coup d'état attempt

Georgios Kondylis (Greek: Γεώργιος Κονδύλης, romanized: Geórgios Kondýlis; 14 August 1878 – 1 February 1936) was a Greek general, politician and prime minister of Greece. He was nicknamed "Keravnos", Greek for "thunder" or "thunderbolt".

== Military career ==
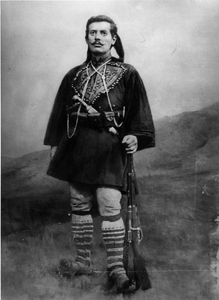
Georgios Kondylis during the Macedonian Struggle

Kondylis was born in Proussos. He enlisted in the army as a volunteer in 1896 and fought with the Greek expeditionary corps in Crete. He was later commissioned and participated in the Macedonian Struggle (1904–1908) leading his own guerrilla band, and was promoted to captain during the Balkan Wars (1912–1913). He supported the Provisional Government of National Defence of Eleftherios Venizelos during the First World War. He was notorious for his cruel oppression of a loyalist revolt in Chalkidiki (September 1916), rising to the rank of lieutenant colonel. A firm Venizelist, he opposed the restoration of King Constantine I in 1920, fleeing to Constantinople together with other Venizelist officers and organising there the "Democratic Defence" (Δημοκρατική Άμυνα). He returned after the 1922 Revolution as a major general, suppressed the royalist revolt of 1923, retired from the army, and became involved in politics.

== Political career ==
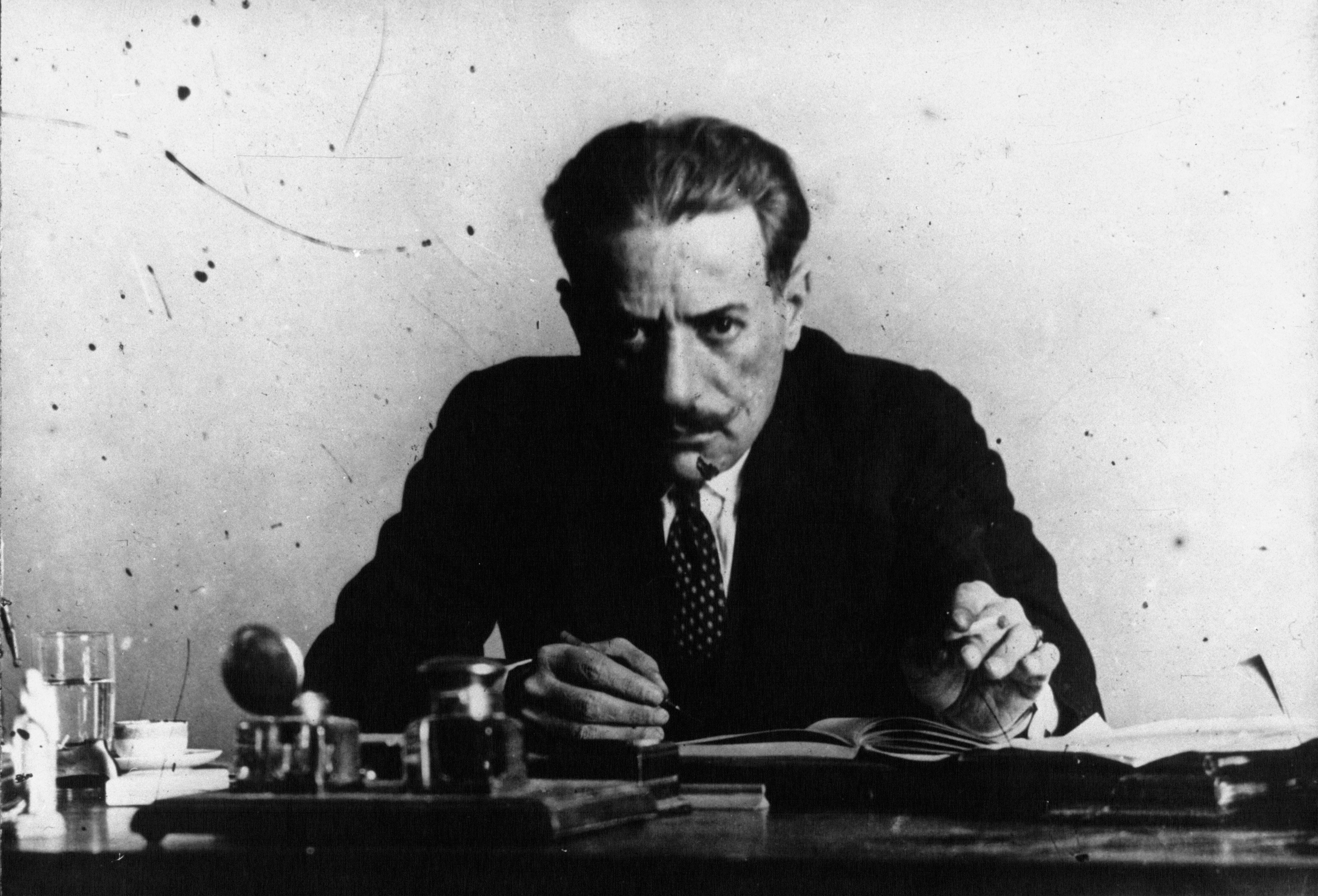
Kondylis circa 1932

He was elected to Parliament at the 1923 elections for the constituency of Rodope, initially for the Democratic Union, and later founded the National Republican Party (Εθνικό Δημοκρατικό Κόμμα), renamed in 1928 National Radical Party (Εθνικό Ριζοσπαστικό Κόμμα). He was war minister from March to June 1924. On 22 August 1926, he overthrew the dictatorship of Theodoros Pangalos in a bloodless coup and formed a government, proclaiming elections for November. Notably, his party did not participate in these. In the elections of August 1928, voters elected nine of his party's candidates as MPs, and he was elected in Kavala.

During this time, Kondylis began moving rightward. In 1932 he became war minister again in return for his support of the Populist government, a post he retained after the Populists were reelected in 1933. From this post he was instrumental in crushing the March 1935 Venizelist revolt. In the period immediately following the revolt, Kondylis became the real power in the country. He sacked numerous pro-republican soldiers and civil servants, and condemned Venizelos to death in absentia.

By now, Kondylis was one of the strongest proponents of restoring the monarchy. However, he opposed Prime Minister Panagis Tsaldaris' call for a referendum. On 10 October 1935, Kondylis and several other officers called on Tsaldaris and forced him to resign. Kondylis forced President Alexandros Zaimis to name him the new premier. Later that day, Kondylis forced Zaimis to resign, declared himself Regent, abolished the Republic and staged a plebiscite on 3 November for the return of the monarchy.

The official tally showed that 98% of the voters supported the return of George II — an suspiciously high total that was likely obtained through fraud. Indeed, the vote took place under less-than-secret conditions. Voters were given the choice of dropping a blue piece of paper in the ballot box if they supported the monarchy, and a red one if they supported the republic. Those who supported the republic risked being beaten up. Under those circumstances, it took a brave Greek to vote "no". By this time, Kondylis had turned so far to the right that he now openly sympathised with fascism. He hoped to echo Benito Mussolini's example in Italy, in which Victor Emmanuel III had been reduced to a puppet.

George returned to Greece on 25 November and retained Kondylis as prime minister. Kondylis soon quarrelled with the king, who was not content to be a mere puppet, and resigned five days later. In the January 1936 elections, he cooperated with Ioannis Rallis and managed to have fifteen MPs elected. Soon after, however, he died of a heart attack on 1 February 1936, in Athens. His nephew, Georgios Kondylis Jr., became a general in the Hellenic army and later fought against the Axis during the German invasion of Greece.

He was awarded Serbian Order of the White Eagle.

Political offices
Preceded by Konstantinos Gondikas	Minister for Military Affairs; 12 March – 9 June 1924	Succeeded by Theodoros Pangalos
Preceded by Georgios Roussos	Minister for the Interior; 7 October 1924 – 15 June 1925	Succeeded by Georgios Maris
Preceded by Athanasios Eftaxias	Prime Minister of Greece (caretaker); 26 August – 4 December 1926	Succeeded by Alexandros Zaimis
Preceded by Charalambos Tseroulis	Minister for Military Affairs (caretaker); 26 August – 4 December 1926	Succeeded by Alexandros Mazarakis-Ainian
Preceded by Ioannis Leonidas	Minister for Naval Affairs (caretaker); 26 August – 4 December 1926	Succeeded by Alexandros Kanaris
Preceded by Theodoros Chavinis	Minister for Military Affairs; 4 November 1932 – 16 January 1933	Succeeded by Georgios Katechakis
Preceded by Alexandros Othonaios	Minister for Military Affairs; 10 March 1933 – 10 October 1935	Succeeded by Alexandros Papagos
Vacant Title last held by Andreas Michalakopoulos (in the 1929–1932 Venizelos cabinet)	Deputy Prime Minister of Greece; 5 April – 10 October 1935	Succeeded by Ioannis Theotokis
Preceded by Panagis Tsaldaris	Prime Minister of Greece; 10 October – 30 November 1935	Succeeded by Konstantinos Demertzis
Preceded by Sofoklis Dousmanis	Minister for Naval Affairs; 10–16 October 1935	Succeeded by Georgios D. Rallis
