= Liberal Party (Greece) =

Liberal Party Κόμμα Φιλελευθέρων
- Founder: Eleftherios Venizelos
- Founded: 22 August 1910 (116 years ago)
- Dissolved: 19 September 1961 (65 years ago)
- Preceded by: Modernist Party (Greece); Barefoot Party (Crete)
- Merged into: Centre Union
- Ideology: Liberalism (Greek); Economic liberalism; Liberal imperialism; Fiscal conservatism; Patriotism; Republicanism; Venizelism
- Political position: Centre

The Liberal Party (Greek: Κόμμα Φιλελευθέρων [ˈkoma filelefˈθeɾon], literally "Party of Liberals") was a major political party in Greece during the early-to-mid 20th century. It was founded in August 1910 by Eleftherios Venizelos, winning a landslide victory in the November 1910 legislative elections. This began an era of Liberal-dominated politics, with the party winning 9 of the 12 elections between 1910 and 1933 and Venizelos serving as Prime Minister for a total of 12 years.

The party's platform was broadly modernising, liberal, social, and nationalist; a set of policies referred to as Venizelism in Greek politics. Though the party contained a social-democratic wing, it became increasingly anti-communist in the 1920s. Originally ambiguous on the issue of the Greek monarchy, the party became decidedly republican following the National Schism and went on to dominate the Second Hellenic Republic. Among its most well-known members, apart from Venizelos, were Alexandros Papanastasiou, Nikolaos Plastiras, Georgios Papandreou and Konstantinos Mitsotakis.

The party struggled to gain support following the 4th of August Regime and the Second World War, before merging into the Centre Union led by Georgios Papandreou and other former Liberal Party members. Since its founding, the party used the anchor as an electoral symbol, similar to the one Venizelos had brought with him from Crete.

== History ==
Founded as the "Party of the Barefeet" (Κόμμα των Ξυπολήτων) in Crete (then an autonomous region of the Ottoman Empire), its early leaders were Kostis Mitsotakis (grandfather of Konstantinos Mitsotakis) and Eleftherios Venizelos. After the annexation of Crete by Greece, Venizelos moved to Athens and turned the party into a national one, under the Fileleftheron (liberal) name in 1910. For the following 25 years, the fate of the party would be tied to that of Venizelos. The party was legally disbanded after the failed coup attempt led by Nikolaos Plastiras of 1935, although the organization remained active.

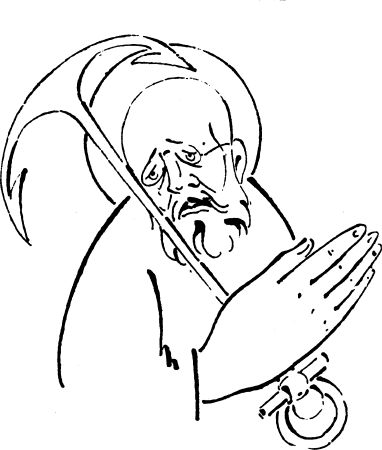
Caricature of Venizelos with the anchor, symbol of the party

During World War II, a Greek government in exile was formed in Cairo, Egypt, with the assistance of the British. The government was formed almost entirely of prominent Liberals, including Georgios Papandreou and Sophoklis Venizelos, even as King George remained the official head of state.

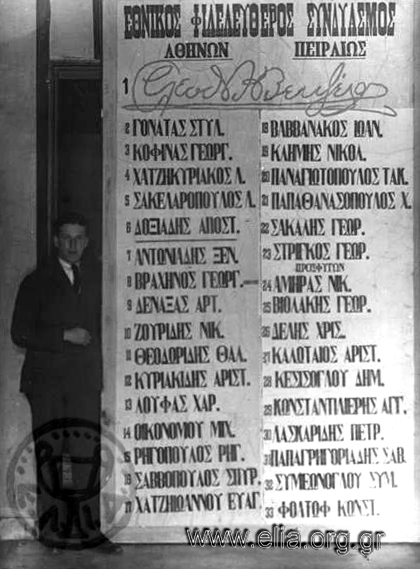
A man posing with a list of National Liberal Club parliamentary candidates for the Athens and Piraeus constituencies, c. 1920.

The party was reformed after the war. By the 1950s, the Liberal Party had lost much of its support and it was eventually merged into the Centre Union, which went on to win the 1963 and 1964 elections. Throughout its existence, the Liberal Party sought to hinder the rise of the Communist Party of Greece which was the only real opposition to the Liberals on their most important electoral basis (the refugees of the New Lands, i.e., lands acquired by Greece following the Balkan Wars and World War I), sometimes with the use of anti-communist legislation.

The Liberal Party merged into Center Union (Enosi Kentrou) in 1961, under the leadership of Georgios Papandreou.

In 1980, Eleftherios Venizelos' grandson Nikitas founded a new party under the same name that claims to be the continuation of the original party, see Liberal Party (Greece, modern).

== Ideology ==
Representing the centrist elements of Greek society, and supported by the middle class and the populations of the New Lands, its main competitor was the People's Party. Increasingly the Liberal Party became associated with anti-monarchism and during the 1920s the Liberals established a republic which they led for most of its short-lived existence. The party carried the ideological legacy of Venizelism.

== Electoral results ==
Results, 1910–1958 (year links to election page)
Year	Type of Election	Votes	%	Mandates	Status
1910	Parliamentary	No data		307 / 362	Government
1912	Parliamentary	No data		146 / 181	Government
May 1915	Parliamentary	No data		187 / 316	Government
Dec 1915	Parliamentary	Boycotted		0 / 335	Extra-parliamentary
1920	Parliamentary	375,803	?	118 / 369	Opposition
1923	Parliamentary	No data		250 / 398	Government
1926	Parliamentary	303,140	31.6	108 / 286	Coalition
1928	Parliamentary	477,502	46.9	178 / 250	Government
1929	Senatorial	450,624	54.6	64 / 120	Majority
1932	Parliamentary	391,521	33.4	98 / 250	Opposition (to Jan 1933)
1932	Parliamentary	391,521	33.4	98 / 250	Coalition (from Jan 1933)
1932	Senatorial	142,575	39.5	16 / 30	Majority
1933	Parliamentary	379,968	33.3	80 / 248	Opposition
1935	Parliamentary	Boycotted		0 / 300	Extra-parliamentary
1936	Parliamentary	474,651	37.3	126 / 300	Opposition
1946	Parliamentary	159,525	14.4	48 / 354	Opposition
1950	Parliamentary	291,083	17.2	56 / 263	Coalition
1951	Parliamentary	325,390	19.0	74 / 258	Opposition
1956	Parliamentary	No data		38 / 308	Opposition
1958	Parliamentary	795,445	20.7	36 / 300	Opposition

== Prominent members ==
(Name, highest office as a party member, year)

- Eleftherios Venizelos, leader, Prime Minister (1910)
- Georgios Kafantaris, Prime Minister (1924)
- Andreas Michalakopoulos, Prime Minister (1924)
- Sophoklis Venizelos, Prime Minister (1944)
- Georgios Papandreou, Prime Minister (1946)
- Konstantinos Mitsotakis, MP (1946)

== Leaders ==
- Eleftherios Venizelos, 1910–1924, 1928–1935
- Georgios Kafantaris, 1924–1928
- Themistoklis Sophoulis, 1935–1948
- Sophoklis Venizelos, 1948–1955, 1957–1961
- Georgios Papandreou, 1953–1958

== Splits of the Liberal Party ==
- 15 April 1922 – 8 May 1929: Democratic Union.

Leader: Alexandros Papanastasiou
In 1929 the party was renamed the Agricultural and Labour Party

- 25 May 1928 – 28 August 1948: Progressive Party

Leader: Georgios Kafantaris

== See also ==
- Venizelism
- Eleftherios Venizelos
- History of Modern Greece
