= Tsouderos =

Tsouderos is a surname. Notable people with the surname include:

- Emmanouil Tsouderos (1882-1956), Prime Minister of Greece
- Ioannis Tsouderos (1923-1997), politician, son of Emmanouil
- Virginia Tsouderou (1924-2018), politician, daughter of Emmanouil
- Melchisedek Tsouderos (1769–1823), monk and Greek revolutionary
- Trine Tsouderos, journalist
