= George II of Greece =

King of Greece (1922–1924; 1935–1947)

George II
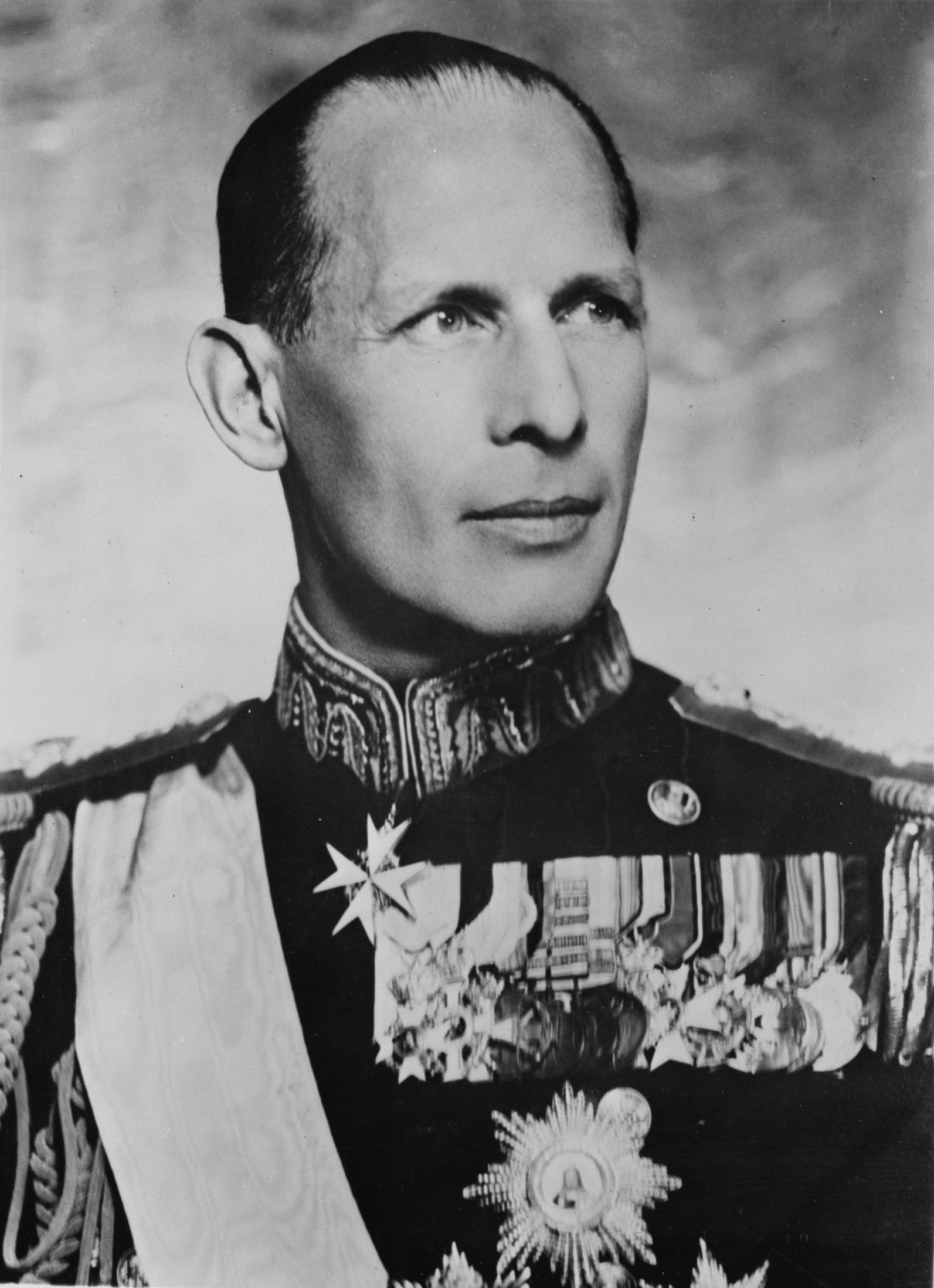
- George II, c. 1942

King of the Hellenes
- First reign: 27 September 1922 – 25 March 1924 (Note: Greece officially adopted the Gregorian calendar on 16 February 1923, which became 1 March. All prior dates used on this page, unless specifically denoted, are in the Gregorian style.)
- Inauguration: 27 September 1922
- Predecessor: Constantine I
- Successor: Monarchy abolished; Pavlos Kountouriotis as President of Greece
- Regent: Pavlos Kountouriotis (from 1923)
- Second reign: 25 November 1935 – 1 April 1947 (Note: In exile from 1941 to 1944.)
- Predecessor: Monarchy re-established; Georgios Kondylis as Regent of Greece
- Successor: Paul
- Regent: Archbishop Damaskinos (1944–1946)
- Born: 19 July 1890 (O.S.: 7 July 1890); Tatoi Palace, Athens, Kingdom of Greece
- Died: 1 April 1947 (aged 56); Athens, Kingdom of Greece
- Burial: 6 April 1947; Royal Cemetery, Tatoi Palace, Greece
- Spouse: Elisabeth of Romania (m. 1921; div. 1935)
- Greek: Γεώργιος Βʹ (Geórgios II)
- House: Glücksburg
- Father: Constantine I of Greece
- Mother: Sophia of Prussia
- Military career
- Allegiance: Kingdom of Greece (Note: George also trained with the Prussian army.)
- Branch: Royal Hellenic Navy; Royal Hellenic Army; Royal Hellenic Air Force
- Service years: 1909–1922 (Note: End of active service.)
- Rank: Second Lieutenant
- Conflicts: First Balkan War; Battle of Bizani; Second Balkan War; Greco-Turkish War (1919–1922); Battle of Kütahya–Eskişehir; Battle of Sakarya

George II (Greek: Γεώργιος Β', romanized: Geórgios II; 19 July [O.S. 7 July] 1890 – 1 April 1947) was King of Greece from 27 September 1922 until 25 March 1924, and again from 25 November 1935 until his death on 1 April 1947.

The eldest son of King Constantine I of Greece and Princess Sophia of Prussia, George followed his father into exile in 1917 following the National Schism, while his younger brother Alexander was installed as king. Constantine was restored to the throne in 1920 after Alexander's death, but was forced to abdicate two years later in the aftermath of the Greco-Turkish War. George acceded to the Greek throne, but after a failed royalist coup in October 1923 he was exiled to Romania. Greece was proclaimed a republic in March 1924 and George was formally deposed and stripped of Greek nationality. He remained in exile until the Greek monarchy was restored in 1935, following a rigged referendum, upon which he resumed his royal duties. The king supported Ioannis Metaxas's 1936 self-coup, which established an authoritarian, nationalist and anti-communist dictatorship known as 4th of August Regime.

Greece was overrun following a German invasion in April 1941, forcing George into his third exile. He left for Crete and then Egypt before settling in London, where he headed the Greek government-in-exile. At the end of the war, George returned to Greece after a 1946 referendum had preserved the monarchy. He died of arteriosclerosis in April 1947 at the age of 56. Having no children, he was succeeded by his younger brother, Paul. He was also a male-line first cousin of Prince Philip, Duke of Edinburgh.

== Early life ==
=== Birth and childhood ===
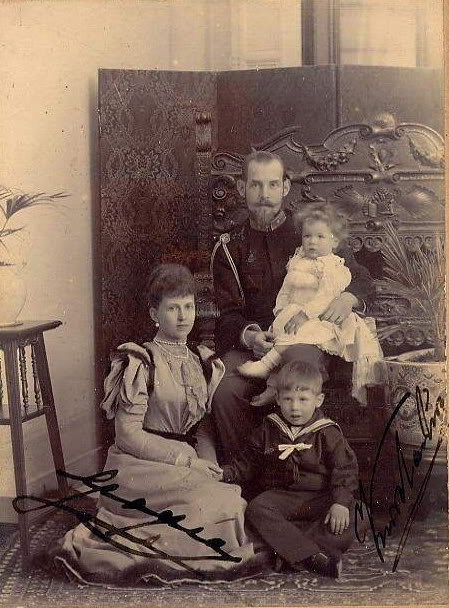
George (lower right) with his parents and younger brother, 1894

George was born at the royal villa at Tatoi, near Athens, the eldest son of Crown Prince Constantine of Greece and the crown princess, Sophia of Prussia. George was a great-grandson of both King Christian IX of Denmark, the "father-in-law of Europe", and Queen Victoria of the United Kingdom, the "grandmother of Europe". George was born nine months after his parents married. Queen Victoria speculated that George was premature, being born a week before his due date. During George's birth, his mother struggled and George's umbilical cord was strapped around his neck. A German midwife, who was sent specially by his grandmother the German Empress Victoria, assisted in George's birth. George was named after his paternal grandfather, King George I of Greece, following traditional Greek naming practices. He was baptized on 18 August [Old Style: 5 August] 1890; his godparents included Queen Victoria.

George was the eldest of six siblings, born between 1890 and 1913, and spent most of his childhood in Athens in a villa on Kifisias Avenue. As a child, George also made numerous visits to Great Britain, where he stayed for several weeks to visit his British relatives. The Greek royals often stayed in Seaford and Eastbourne. George also made visits to Germany to see his mother's family and they stayed in Schlosshotel Kronberg with his grandmother Victoria, but also took summer holidays in Corfu and Venice, travelling on their private yacht, Amphritrite IV.

George has been described by historians John Van der Kiste and Vicente Mateos Sáinz de Medrano as the most introverted and distant of his siblings, having been aware of his role as heir from a young age. Van der Kiste presents George as a child who often misbehaved, especially during visits to Germany, but less turbulent than his younger brother, Alexander, who was described as mischievous, and less sporty than his younger sister, Helen, who was seen as a tomboy.

=== Goudi coup and Balkan Wars ===
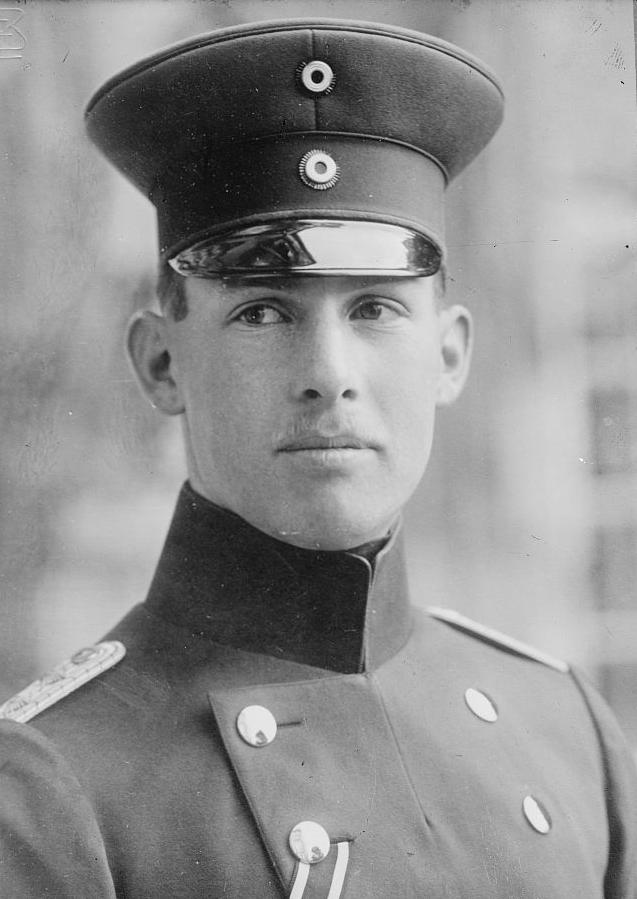
George in Prussian uniform, 1914

George pursued a military career, training with the Prussian Guard at the age of 18, then serving in the Balkan Wars as a member of the 1st Infantry Regiment. George received a military education as the heir to the throne. He was trained at the Hellenic Military Academy in Athens, which allowed him to enroll in Greece's infantry as a second lieutenant on 27 May [Old Style: 14 May] 1909. However, a few months after he joined, on 15 August [Old Style: 2 August] 1909, a group of military officers organised a coup d'état against George I, the concurrent king and grandfather of George. The coup d'état became known as the Goudi coup and was led by Nikolaos Zorbas, who declared himself a monarchist, but campaigned for the dismissal of all princes from the army. Zorbas argued that dismissing princely soldiers would protect the popularity of the royal family. However, it is argued by Van der Kiste that many of the officers involved in the coup blamed the high-ranking princes for the defeat of Greece in the 1897 Greco-Turkish War. They particularly placed blame on George's father, Crown Prince Constantine, believing that the royal family was monopolising the highest army positions.

Some of the officers involved in the coup believed that the country would be better off if King George I was deposed and replaced by another neutral candidate, such as by George, his grandson. Proposed candidates included the Austrian duke Francis of Teck or a member of the German royal House of Hohenzollern. However, George was the most desirable candidate as he was more popular than his father, was an adult and was politically inexperienced, so was seen as easily more controllable. Violence sparked by the coup continued until February 1910 and members of the royal family were forced to resign from the military in order to avoid a revolution. George, his siblings and his parents evacuated Greece and moved to Germany for three years in exile. To avoid controversy, their exile was branded as a three-year "education leave", which was approved and so George continued his military training, but with the prestigious First Foot Guards Regiment of the Prussian army. This period of absence from Greece reduced his popularity as a potential replacement for his grandfather.

As Greece became more politically stable as violent protests lessened, George, his siblings and his parents returned to Greece at the end of 1910. In 1911, Prime Minister Eleftherios Venizelos allowed members of the royal family to be given back their former ranks in the military, but George returned to Germany to continue training with the Prussian army. When the First Balkan War commenced in October 1912, George returned to Greece to fight against the Ottoman Empire. George and his brother, Alexander, served as officers on his father's staff. George served in numerous battles, which was criticised by the media as it put the country's future monarch at risk of being killed. One such battle that George participated in was the capture of Thessaloniki on 8 November [Old Style: 26 October] 1912, which marked major progress for Greece in the war.

== Crown Prince ==
=== World War I ===
On 18 March [Old Style: 5 March] 1913, George's grandfather and the reigning king, George I, was assassinated while taking his daily walk in Thessaloniki. Crown Prince Constantine, whose popularity had grown due to Greece's successes in the First Balkan War, acceded to the throne as King Constantine I. George thus became the Crown Prince of Greece at age 23. In the early weeks of being crown prince, George and his family moved to their new residence, where George developed a close friendship with his uncle, Prince Christopher, who was only two years older than him. On 30 June [Old Style: 17 June] 1913, the Second Balkan War broke out between Bulgaria and its former allies, which included Greece. Relations between Greece and many of its Balkan allies grew during the war, notably with Romania, which paved the way towards the marriage between George and Elisabeth, the daughter of King Ferdinand I and Queen Marie of Romania. When Greece and its allies won the war in August 1913, George and his family resumed their European trips. George accompanied his father on a state visit to Berlin and received the Order of the Red Eagle from his uncle, Wilhelm II, the German Kaiser. The following summer, George travelled to the United Kingdom with Christopher and was in London when he heard of the assassination of Archduke Franz Ferdinand of Austria on 28 June 1914.

The assassination sparked the outbreak of World War I, in which Constantine wished to maintain Greece's neutrality. Constantine believed that Greece was unready to fight after its involvement in the Balkan Wars and also feared displeasing his brother-in-law, Wilhelm II. Opposition soon accused Constantine of supporting the Triple Alliance, made up of Germany, Austria-Hungary and Italy, and relations between him and Venizelos, who believed that Greece should side with the Triple Entente, made up of Great Britain, France and Russia, quickly deteriorated. The entire Greek government, supported by the French government, soon declared in October 1916 that siding with the Entente was their preferred option. Central Greece was occupied by the Western Allies, an extension of the Triple Entente, and a National Schism between supporters of Constantine and supporters of Venizelos broke out. Constantine refused to alter his opinion and his popularity heavily decreased. A fire in Tatoi Palace broke out on 14 July [Old Style: 1 July] 1916 and French agents were blamed for it. Multiple members of the royal family were close fatalities of it. Though George was not present at the time, his younger sister, Princess Katherine, who was only three years old, was carried into the palace woods for two kilometres to be saved. Between sixteen and eighteen people, made up of firefighters and palace staff, died.

On 19 June [Old Style: 6 June] 1917, French politician and leader of the Entente Charles Jonnart ordered George's father, Constantine, to abdicate. Due to worry of the impending Allied invasion at Piraeus, Constantine agreed to be placed in exile without having to abdicate. The Allies were against establishing a republic in Greece and thus looked for a replacement. George's name was put forward, but the Allies perceived him as a germanophile, like his father, due to his links to the Prussian army and German imperial family. George's uncle, Prince George, was offered the position, but he refused out of loyalty to Constantine. Ultimately, George's younger brother, Alexander, was chosen by Venizelos and the Entente to replace Constantine.

On 10 June [Old Style: 28 May] 1917, Alexander officially ascended to the throne in a small ceremony that was only attended by George and former prime minister Alexandros Zaimis. In addition, Theocletus I, the Archbishop of Athens and All Greece, did not attend. The ceremony is kept secret from the public and there are no state celebrations that occur. Alexander, who was only 23 years old, was described as having a "broken voice" and teary eyes when he took the oath of loyalty to the constitution. Historians, such as Van der Kiste, argue that he was fearful of dealing with his opponents and the fact that his reign was illegitimate according to succession laws. Neither Constantine nor George had renounced their rights to the throne, and Constantine told Alexander that he viewed him as the country's regent, not monarch. On the evening of the ceremony, Alexander moved from the future presidential mansion in inner Athens to Tatoi. George and all other members of the royal family had planned to leave for exile, however crowds of people protested outside the mansion to prevent them from leaving, so they had to escape in secret the following day. They reached the port of Oropos and fled the country due to the war. This was the final time that George had contact with his brother, Alexander.

=== First exile ===
George and his family settled in Switzerland, first in Saint Moritz and then in Zürich. Almost all members of the royal family moved with them after Venizelos returned to power as head of the Cabinet and organised Greece's entry into World War I. The family were financially strained and Constantine soon became ill. He almost died in 1918 upon also contracting the Spanish flu. At the Treaty of Sèvres and Treaty of Neuilly-sur-Seine, part of the end of World War I, Greece made territorial gains in Thrace and Anatolia. Although initially seen as gains to the country, Greece soon fell into the Second Greco-Turkish War in 1919. Tension between Venizelos and the royal family remained high and was not helped when Alexander decided to marry aristocrat Aspasia Manos, rather than a foreign royal, which dismayed Venizelos. Venizelos saw this decision as a missed opportunity to move closer to Great Britain.

According to historian Marlene Eilers Koenig, George was in love with his cousin Anastasia de Torby, however their relationship was opposed by George's mother, Sophia, as Anastasia was the result of a morganatic marriage. George later became engaged in October 1920 to Elisabeth of Romania, who had been in touch with George since 1911. George had previously asked Elisabeth to marry in 1914, but she declined off the advice of her great-aunt, Elisabeth of Wied, who thought of George as being too small and too English. Elisabeth herself had declared that George was a prince whom God had forgotten to complete. Her feelings remain the same when the pair meet in Switzerland, however she accepted on the basis of her own imperfections. Although George's family had lost most of their wealth in exile, the Romanian royal family swiftly invited George and Elisabeth to return to Bucharest, in Romania, to announce their engagement.

=== Greco-Turkish war ===
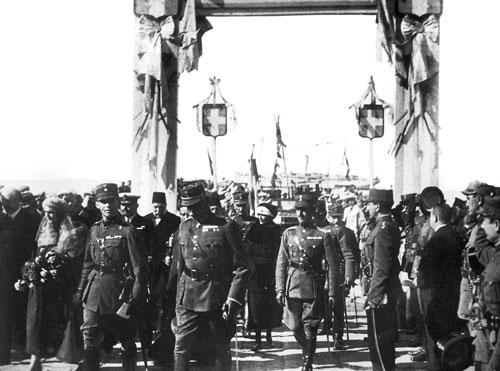
Arrival of Crown Prince George in Smyrna (İzmir), 1921

George was in Romania when Alexander died following an infection from a monkey bite in 1920. Parliament continued to refuse the crown to either George or Constantine, so it was offered to Constantine's third son, Paul, who refused to break the legitimate line of succession. Greece was making no progress in the Greco-Turkish War and in the 1920 Greek legislative election, Venizelos was voted out of office. Dimitrios Rallis, a monarchist, was appointed prime minister and the 1920 Greek referendum restored Constantine to the throne. According to Van der Kiste, the referendum was most likely rigged by Rallis. Before Venizelos fled to Constantinople in exile, he asked George's grandmother, Olga Constantinovna, to act as regent while Constantine returned to Greece. On 19 December, George returned to Greece as the crown prince under his father's second reign. Many portraits of Venizelos were torn down in state celebrations and replaced with photos of the royal family. Upon their return, the royals made numerous balcony appearances to please the large crowd that had turned out to see them return.

A few weeks later, on 27 February [Old Style: 14 February] 1921, George married Elisabeth in Bucharest. Two weeks later, George's younger sister, Helen, married Elisabeth's brother, Crown Prince Carol of Romania, in Athens. Constantine's restoration to the Greek throne was opposed by the former Allies of World War I, and thus Greece received minimal support in the Greco-Turkish War against Mustafa Kemal's Turkey. The former Allies stated that they were not ready to provide support, and continued to hold distaste against Constantine. For example, at the wedding of Princess Helen and Crown Prince Carol, the British ambassador and his wife refused to greet Constantine and Sophia.

In response to the ongoing war, Constantine quickly assumed the role of commander-in-chief of the army and resided in Asia Minor from May to September 1921. George served as a colonel, and later a major general in the war. He travelled with his father to Smyrna and other battlefronts, where he visited wounded Greek soldiers and civilians in hospital. Greece was pushed back from the Anatolian lands granted to them in the Treaty of Sèvres to Ankara and suffered heavy defeats at the Battle of Sakarya in August and September 1921. The royal family became more criticised and Greek media turned against George and two of his uncles when they made comments critiquing Venizelos. Prince Andrew, the father of the future Prince Philip, Duke of Edinburgh, fled from Asia Minor before Greece's defeat at Sakarya, which was mocked by Turkish forces. In the next few months, Greek forces continued to be defeated and slowly retreated towards Smyrna, while George was stationed in Ionia and Elisabeth joined the Red Cross to help Christian refugees who had escaped villages that had fallen to the Turkish army. Elisabeth's distance from George furthers her struggles of integrating into the Greek culture. Mateos Sáinz de Medrano documents that Elisabeth was jealous of the successes of her sister, Queen Maria of Yugoslavia.

Elisabeth had been pregnant since her and George's marriage, but suffered a miscarriage while travelling to Smyrna. Some historians argue that her miscarriage was actually the abortion of an illegitimate child that was the result of an affair between her and British diplomat Frank Rattigan, the father of Terence Rattigan. Elisabeth soon contracted typhoid, pleurisy and depression, before returning to Bucharest. Though George and Elisabeth's mother were attempting to convince her to return to Greece, her health never fully recovered after her miscarriage. Simultaneously, Turkish forces had organised an invasion of Smyrna, which fell on 9 September [Old Style: 27 August] 1922. Around two weeks later, the city was ransacked and burned. An estimated tens of thousands of Greeks and Armenians were killed, which influenced a greater degree of republicanism in Athens. When the Turks again defeated Greece at the Battle of Dumlupınar, a sector of the military, led by colonels Nikolaos Plastiras and Stylianos Gonatas, demanded the abdication of Constantine and the dissolution of the parliament.

== First reign ==
To avoid more unrest, Constantine officially abdicated on 27 September [Old Style: 14 September] 1922 and moved to Italy with Sophia and his daughters in exile, while George became monarch. George left for Bucharest to retrieve his wife and the pair returned to Greece to be crowned. George officially ascended to the throne as George II, but did not receive a happy reception and faced harsh criticism. In Greece, there had been greater political instability since the 1922 Greek coup d'état, which influenced Constantine's abdication, and a large influx of refugees from Asia Minor as a result of the war. Supporters of Venizelos still maintained a high degree of influence and power in the country, with Plastiras and Gonatas leading the country. George and Elisabeth were confined to Tatoi and were highly monitored by the government, while George worried about the growing instability in Greece and criticism from the former Allies, who had previously refused to recognise Constantine's second reign.

Between 13 October and 28 November (Note: [Old Style: Between 30 September and 15 November]) 1922, the Trial of the Six took place and saw the punishment of numerous monarchist politicians who had opposed the Venizelos administration. The verdict of the trial resulted in former prime ministers Dimitrios Gounaris, Petros Protopapadakis and Nikolaos Stratos, as well as politicians Georgios Baltatzis, Nikolaos Theotokis and Georgios Hatzanestis, being shot on 28 November. All six of them had been strong supporters of the monarchy and their executions were to the dismay of George, who had lost his right to pardon and could not intervene in the trial. Continued opposition to the royal family was occurring, such as the arrest of Prince Andrew on 26 October at the royal residence of Mon Repos on Corfu. Andrew was later transported to Athens and imprisoned for "disobeying an order" and "acting on his own initiative" during battles in Anatolia. The Greek government was criticised by George V of the United Kingdom, Alfonso XIII of Spain and Pope Pius XI, before Andrew's sentence was reduced to capital banishment in order to avoid sanctions. On 5 December [Old Style: 22 November], a British ship was sent to transport Andrew and his family, including the young Prince Philip, out of Greece and to Britain, to the dismay of George.

Constantine died in Palermo on 11 January 1923 [Old Style: 29 December 1922] without being granted a state funeral, which left George considering abdication. General Ioannis Metaxas, who was a supporter of the monarchy, encouraged George to stay in the country with the hope that instability would gradually reduce. Following a failed royalist coup d'état in October 1923, the Greek government, led by the republican prime minister, Gonatas, asked George to leave the country while the National Assembly considered the question of the future form of government. Though most likely uninvolved, George was accused of initiating the coup d'état, and Plastiras and Theodoros Pangalos openly campaigned for the abolition of the monarchy for the first time. The 1923 Greek legislative election determined that Venizelos would replace Gonatas, however before the changeover in government, Gonatas demanded that George leave the country. George complied and although he refused to abdicate, George departed on 19 December 1923 for exile in his wife's home nation of Romania. Before fleeing, George was described as a cold and aloof man, who rarely inspired love or affection from his subjects. Many commented that his moody, sullen personality seemed more appropriate for his ancestral homeland of Denmark than Greece. Furthermore, George's long years spent living abroad had caused him to struggle in identifying with the Greek culture.

== Second exile ==
The Second Hellenic Republic was proclaimed by parliament on 25 March 1924, before being confirmed by the 1924 Greek republic referendum two and a half weeks later. George and Elisabeth were officially deposed and banished, along with all members of the royal family, who were stripped of their Greek citizenship. Royal properties were also confiscated by the government of the new republic. Rendered stateless, they were issued new passports from their cousin, Christian X of Denmark. Exiled in Romania from December 1923, George and his wife settled in Bucharest, where Elisabeth's parents, King Ferdinand and Queen Marie, put at their disposal a wing of the Cotroceni Palace for some time. After several weeks however, the couple moved and established their residence in a more modest villa on Victory Avenue. As regular guests of the Romanian sovereigns, George and Elisabeth took part in the ceremonies which punctuated the life of the Hohenzollern-Sigmaringen family. Despite the kindness with which his mother-in-law treated him, George felt idle in Bucharest and struggled to hide the boredom he felt from the splendors of the Romanian court.

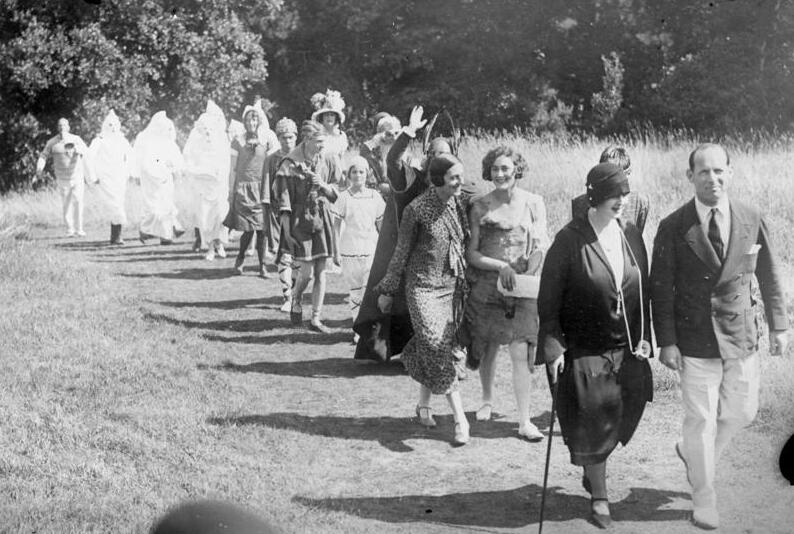
George II and his wife during a stay in the UK, 1931

After their exile, financial difficulties and absence of children, George and Elisabeth's marriage deteriorated. Elisabeth carried out multiple extra-marital affairs with various married men. When visiting her sick sister, Maria, in Belgrade, she reportedly flirted with her own brother-in-law, Alexander I of Yugoslavia. Later, she began an affair with her husband's banker, a Greek named Alexandros Scavani, whom she made her chamberlain to cover up the scandal. In exile, George stayed half the year in Romania with Elisabeth, and the other half living with his mother at Villa Bobolina in Tuscany, either with or without his wife. George eventually moved to the United Kingdom, where he had numerous extended family members and friends. On 16 September 1930, George was initiated into Freemasonry in London and became venerable master of the Wellwood Lodge in 1933. After the death of Sophia in 1932, George chose to permanently leave Bucharest and his wife to establish his residence in London. Accompanied by his squire, Major Dimitrios Levidis, and one of his servants, Mitso Panteleos, George rented a small suite with two rooms at Brown's Hotel, London.

George still lacked much wealth and received a mixed reception in Britain, where he was criticised for his relations with Wilhelm II. In London, George was finally reunited with Andrew and his wife. George also regularly attended hunting trips in Scotland with his companions and members of the British royal family, who he frequently went to pubs and antique dealers with. George became quite knowledgeable in old furniture and English silverware. George avoided mentioning his political views or any plans for restoring the Greek monarchy, but made himself clear that he would return as monarch if asked to and that he still considered himself Greek. George attended the wedding of his cousin, Marina, and George, Duke of Kent, in Greek army uniform. After the wedding celebrations had concluded, George left on a trip to British India for several months. Under Lord Willingdon, the Viceroy and Governor-General of India, George was treated as the sovereign of Greece and met numerous officials stationed there, while being enthusiastically interested in the Indian culture. During his stay, George fell in love with a young woman named Joyce Wallach, who was married to John Britten-Jones, the aide-de-camp to the Governor of India. Wallach filed for divorce and moved back to London with George, however would continue to have numerous affairs up until George's death in 1947. On 6 July 1935, George learned through the newspaper that Elisabeth had filed for divorce after she accused him of "desertion from the family home". A court in Bucharest processed the divorce without inviting George to attend.

== Second reign ==
=== Restoration of the monarchy ===
After the abolition of the monarchy in 1924, leaders who opposed Venizelos, except for Metaxas, refused to recognise the new regime. This "regime issue" that arose just after the proclamation of the republic, haunted Greek politics for more than a decade and eventually led to the restoration of monarchy. In just over ten years, Greece had twenty-three governments, thirteen coup d'états and one dictatorship. On average, each Cabinet lasted six months and a coup d'état was organised every 42 weeks. Having failed to restore political stability, the republicanism movement in Greece became criticised and opposed by the public. Gradually, there were more and more protests that voiced to restore the monarchy. Although most protestors wished to have George reinstalled, there were voices to have a new monarch from a new dynasty be inducted, such as George, Duke of Kent.

On 10 October 1935, General Georgios Kondylis, a former supporter of Venizelos who had suddenly decided to support the monarchist forces, overthrew the government and appointed himself prime minister, replacing Panagis Tsaldaris and Zaimis, who were prime minister and president respectively. Aware of Kondylis' ultimate aim of restoring the monarchy, George, who had been living at Brown's Hotel, demanded a plebiscite be held in order to determine whether he would be reinstalled. Kondylis thus arranged the rigged 1935 Greek plebiscite, both to approve his government and to bring an end to the republic. On 3 November 1935, almost 98% of the reported votes supported the restoration of the monarchy. The balloting was not secret, and participation was compulsory. As Time described it at the time, "As a voter one could drop into the ballot box a blue vote for George II and please General George Kondylis ... or one could cast a red ballot for the Republic and get roughed up."

The organisation of the plebiscite discontented the Greek government. When the election results were announced, a delegation was sent to the Greek embassy in London to officially ask George and his younger brother, Paul, to return to Athens, which they accepted on 5 November 1935. Before returning to Greece, they first travelled to France and Italy. In Paris, George and Prince Andrew were greeted by French President Albert Lebrun and interviewed by French media. George and Paul then travelled to Villa Sparta, Italy, to retrieve their sisters and pay respects to their parents' graves at the Church of the Nativity of Christ and St. Nicholas, a Russian Orthodox Church in Florence. After a brief stay in Rome with Victor Emmanuel III of Italy, the Greek royals boarded the cruiser Elli in Brindisi and returned to Phalerum in Athens on 25 November.

Kondylis lost his status as Regent of Greece, but ensured that George kept him as prime minister, before awarding him with the Grand Cross of the Order of George I. Almost immediately after being restored, George and Kondylis disagreed over the terms of a general amnesty that George wanted to declare, so Kondylis resigned on 30 November 1935 and George appointed Konstantinos Demertzis as interim prime minister. The 1936 Greek legislative election confirmed that communism was gaining popularity within the country. This was perhaps due to the continuing large influx of refugees from Asia Minor, who had been arriving since 1922. In the election, the Communist Party of Greece (KKE) gained fifteen seats, which established it as a buffer between monarchists and republicans. Political instability ensued after the unexpected, but natural, deaths of Demertzis, Kondylis, Venizelos and Tsaldaris. George appointed Metaxas as prime minister on 13 April 1936. Metaxas was opposed by the country's communist forces, who were against his policies. Metaxas also told George that he wished to suspend certain articles of the constitution in order to establish a dictatorship.

=== Metaxas ===
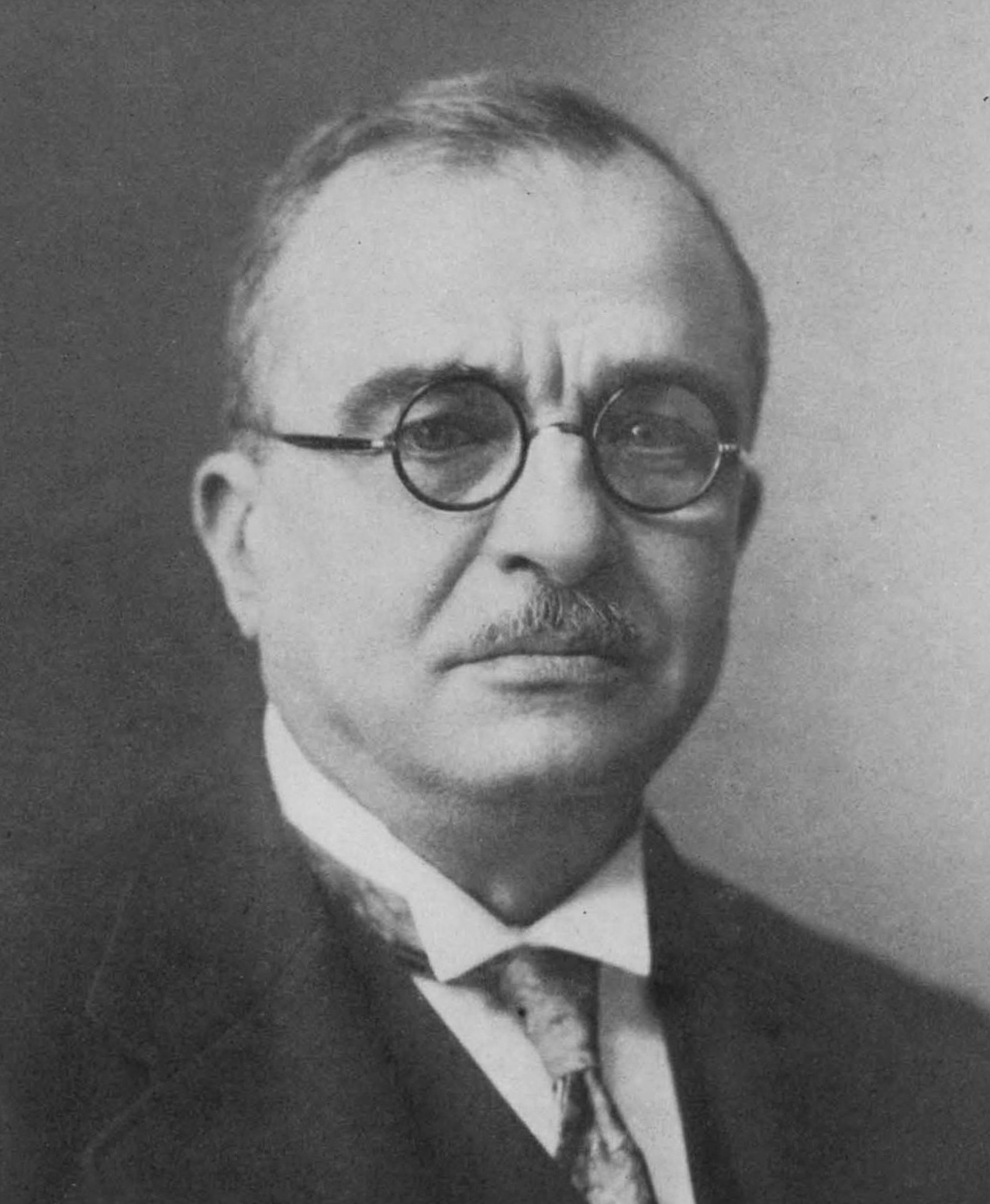
George II and Ioannis Metaxas (pictured) established a dictatorship in Greece.

On 4 August 1936, George endorsed Metaxas's dictatorship, known as the "4th of August Regime", signing decrees that dissolved the parliament, banned political parties, abolished the constitution and purported to create a "Third Hellenic Civilization". George, ruling jointly with Metaxas, oversaw a right-wing regime in which political opponents were arrested and strict censorship was imposed. Many books, such as the works of Plato, Thucydides and Xenophon, were banned. Though not branded as a fascist regime, Metaxas's dictatorship was arguably quasi-fascist and heavily imitated that of Benito Mussolini in Italy, whom Adolf Hitler had also been inspired by in Germany. George disliked dealing with both Greek politicians and ordinary Greeks, and preferred to let Metaxas undertake tours around the country.. George retained full control of the army and he was largely responsible for foreign policy making. Metaxas's support of the monarch has been likened to that of Venizelos with Alexander. Although his reign was mostly guaranteed under the dictatorship, George was weary of Metaxas' growing power and the influence of the army. George told his cousin, Princess Victoria Louise of Prussia, that he felt so isolated that he could not trust anyone in Greece. To avoid a possible overthrow by Metaxas, George declared to the Greek ambassador to the United Kingdom that he supported Metaxas's policies, though he also voiced his concern.

The Greeks are orientals. They consider moderation in the exercise of power as a weakness. They are the most democratic people in the world, but once they take power, they automatically become tyrannical. Everyone knows it and accepts it.

— George II to the Greek ambassador to the United Kingdom.

Most of the royal family's possessions had been either ransacked, lost or sold during the republic. For example, the Presidential Palace in Athens had been almost completely emptied, its furniture sold by the republican Greek government. When the monarchy was restored, George nor any member of the royal family requested compensation for their lost property. Lacking wealth, George took charge of the restoration and redecoration works of his residencies, which he refurnished by gaining items from auctions and markets. George continued his relationship with Wallach, but it was kept secret from the public and any possible marriage between the pair would not be allowed due to Wallach's commoner status. When engagements required a first lady to be present, George would call his sister Katherine or his sister Irene, who were both single at the time. George made very frequent visits back to London, at least once every year, typically at the end of the year, to reunite with his extended family and friends. He was weary of Metaxas when taking these trips and would never be away from Greece for too long. His trips though allowed for the acquisition by Greece of more military equipment and vehicles from Britain. One of George's priorities was to retrieve the bodies of his mother and father from Italy. In November 1936, he sent Paul to Florence to recover the bodies of their parents, Constantine and Sophie, and of their grandmother, Olga. They were transferred to Greece by the ship Averof and exhibited for the public for six days in the Metropolitan Cathedral of Athens. On 23 November, a small ceremony was held at the Church of the Resurrection at Tatoi. It was attended by members of the royal family and foreign European royals and nobles. George would go on, in 1940, to retrieve the remains of his aunt, Alexandra, who had died in Russia in 1891, from the Soviet Union. This satisfied the wishes of his grandmother.

With George's divorce, his relationship with a commoner and his lack of offspring, Paul assumed the role of heir apparent to the throne, however he too was still single. Succession laws were semi-Salic, meaning that one of their uncles or cousins would have to inherit the throne after Paul, however all their uncles were aging and their cousins were estranged from the country. After facing pressure to marry, Paul wedded Frederica of Hanover, the daughter of his cousin, Victoria Louise, and Ernest Augustus, Duke of Brunswick, on 9 January 1938. Though a notable amount of dignitaries were in Athens for their wedding, many Greeks feared having another queen who was German and who was the granddaughter of Wilhelm II. Hitler, now the Führer of Nazi Germany, also wished to take advantage of the wedding by incorporating Nazi swastikas into the ceremony. George was quick to oppose this and managed to avoid any Nazi influence on the day. On 1 July 1939, George's sister, Irene, married Prince Aimone, Duke of Aosta, a cousin of Victor Emmanuel III and the future King of Croatia. Their wedding in Florence was to the dismay of Mussolini, who forbade the Greek flag from being raised on Italian soil. As a result, George threatened to boycott the ceremony, but Metaxas advised him to attend to avoid further deterioration in Greco-Italian relations.

=== World War II ===
==== Home front ====
On 2 June 1940 Frederica gave birth to the future Constantine II. Simultaneously, World War II began to spread across Europe and France collapsed to Nazi Germany under Blitzkrieg. Fascist Italy soon joined on 10 June as an Axis Power. Mussolini commenced a violent propaganda campaign against Greece and accused George, who had declared Greece's neutrality, of harbouring British ships in Greek waters. On 15 August an Italian submarine sunk the Elli, which was escorting a ship of pilgrims off Tinos. The Nazi government in Germany proposed mediation between Italy and Greece. Hitler promised that if George, who he saw as an anglophile, abdicated from the throne, Germany would guarantee no Italian invasion of Greece and grant Greece territories off the coast of the Balkans. George was outraged at this proposition and stated, "[The Nazis] would do better to not stick their noses in the affairs of this country if they know what is good for them!" On 28 October 1940 Metaxas rejected an Italian ultimatum demanding the stationing of Italian troops on Greek soil, sparking the Greco-Italian War. Plastiras, head of the opposition-in-exile, proclaimed their support of George and Metaxas. George consequentially took charge of Greek armed forces and established contact with the Allies, while conducting daily war council meetings at the Hotel Grande Bretagne. George travelled up north to support soldiers as well. Greece successfully repelled the Italian invasion and launched a successful counter-attack, eventually occupying the southern half of Italian Albania.

Metaxas died on 29 January 1941 and George refused to set up a government of national unity, despite calls from both wings of politics to do so. George appointed Alexandros Koryzis as the new prime minister and he retained the dictatorial powers that Metaxas had held. The Invasion of the Balkans by the Axis Powers ensued and the Luftwaffe conducted Operation Punishment on 6 April, in which Belgrade was bombed when the government denounced the Tripartite Pact. On 9 April the Metaxas Line was penetrated by German troops from Bulgaria and Thessaloniki was occupied. Greek forces had to retreat further south as the Axis Powers continued to make progress within Greek borders. On 20 April a squadron of the Greek army surrendered for the first time. Koryzis told George to accept capitulation, but George reportedly burst into anger and gave his intentions of never surrendering. Following Koryzis' suicide on 18 April 1941 in the face of the rapid German advance, George, unable to find a speedy successor, found himself as the de facto head of government as well as head of the armed services.

George had thus a unique opportunity to form a broader government of national consensus, and abolish the hated 4th of August Regime—whose sole bastion of support he now was. Though urged to this step by the influential British ambassador, Michael Palairet, George refused. Instead, several names were put forward to head a government. George initially proposed Konstantinos Kotzias, one of Metaxas's ministers, but his ties to the regime made him an unfeasible choice. Instead, veteran Venizelist general Alexandros Mazarakis-Ainian was given the mandate to form a government, but returned it on 20 April, partly due to his refusal to collaborate with Metaxas's hated Security Minister Konstantinos Maniadakis. Other figures, such as the former dictator Pangalos, were also rejected. Finally, Emmanouil Tsouderos, former governor of the Bank of Greece, was chosen, chiefly on account of his known Anglophile sentiments, Venizelist past, and Cretan origin—with mainland Greece being overrun, the government was preparing to evacuate to Crete. Most Cretans supported Venizelos but were generally seen as anti-monarchical; this appointment was seen as a sop to local sentiment.

On 22 April most members of the royal family were evacuated from the Greek mainland to Crete, but George and Paul remained in Athens until the next day, when they and the government fled as well. George established headquarters in Chania, a few weeks before a German airborne attack. Despite defense of the island by Greek, Australian and New Zealand forces, alongside the local population, Crete slowly succumbed to Nazi forces. Hitler had named George the "number one enemy of the Reich in Greece" and George had narrowly escaped German paratroopers, so he decided that the royals and the government were to evacuate. They escaped on HMS Decoy and fled to Egypt. For his actions on Crete, George was awarded with the Distinguished Service Order, becoming the only monarch in history to be decorated with the award.

==== King-in-exile ====
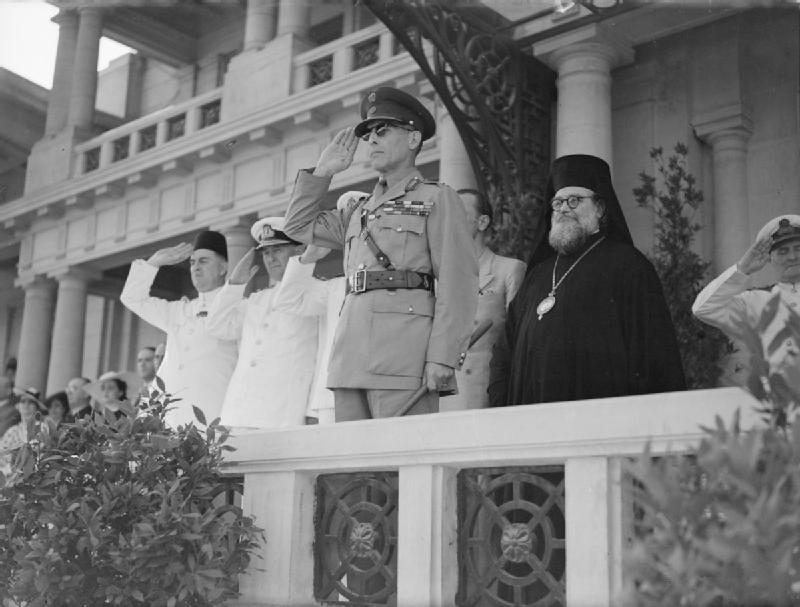
George II in Egypt, 1942

Throughout the Axis occupation, George remained the internationally recognised head of state, backed by the Greek government-in-exile and the Free Greek Forces. However, the British Foreign Office found George exceedingly difficult to deal with. He was deeply obstinate about upholding what he regarded as his royal prerogatives. He proved notably unwilling to compromise with those who wanted a clear break with the 4th of August Regime. He also resisted British pressure to promise to restore the constitution of 1911, under the grounds that doing so would be to admit he acted illegally in suspending parts of the constitution in 1936. As late as 1942, George kept on Cabinet ministers from the Metaxas regime, most notably Maniadakis.

The Greek royals' presence in Egypt upset Farouk of Egypt and his pro-Italian ministry, forcing George to find a new place of refuge for the family. George VI of the United Kingdom opposed having Frederica in Britain out of worry that she would bring attention to the British royal family's German origins. After deliberation, George and Paul only were granted permission to reside in London, with the rest of the family relocating to Cape Town, South Africa. George, Wallach, Paul and Levidis stationed themselves at Claridge's in Mayfair. George and Tsouderos organised with Winston Churchill and the British Cabinet the placement of Greek troops in the Middle East and the purification of the Greek army by eliminating communist and Venizelist ideals. However, this provoked republican groups and several mutinies within the army and navy were conducted, which disrupted the Allies' efficiency in the Levant. On 22 October 1941, George finally, yet reluctantly, drafted with his Cabinet-in-exile, due to pressure from the British government and republican Greek opposition, a decree that would establish a new parliamentary regime. He also restored articles 5, 6, 10, 12, 14, 20 and 95, which had been suspended by Metaxas. The decree was signed on 4 February 1942, finally abolishing the 4th of August Regime. The following month, George and Tsouderos returned to Egypt to organise Greek troops and stayed there until June. George travelled to the United States and met with President Franklin D. Roosevelt, before flying to London and then Cairo. In Cairo in March 1943, an official government-in-exile was finally proclaimed.

Perhaps deeply paranoid and insecure, George believed that the British government was plotting to prevent his return to Greece, despite all of the evidence to the contrary. Edward Warner of the Southern Department of the Foreign Office wrote in March 1942 that the king was "under the extraordinary impression that the Foreign Office was 'pro-Republican and anti-himself'". The British ambassador to the government-in-exile, Sir Reginald Leeper, noted that the king's coldness did not win him many friends, writing: "Amongst these vivacious, talkative and intensely political southerners he is very much the reserved northerner who damps the ardour of those who might otherwise acclaim him". Leeper noted that almost every meeting he had with the king, he had to listen to a lengthy litany of complaints. In particular, the king objected to BBC's Greek language service, whose main radio announcer, G.N. Soteriadis, was a Venizelist. George repeatedly asked that Soteriadis be replaced with a monarchist. One of George's few friends was Churchill, who was determined to see him restored and often backed the king's complaints against his own officials.

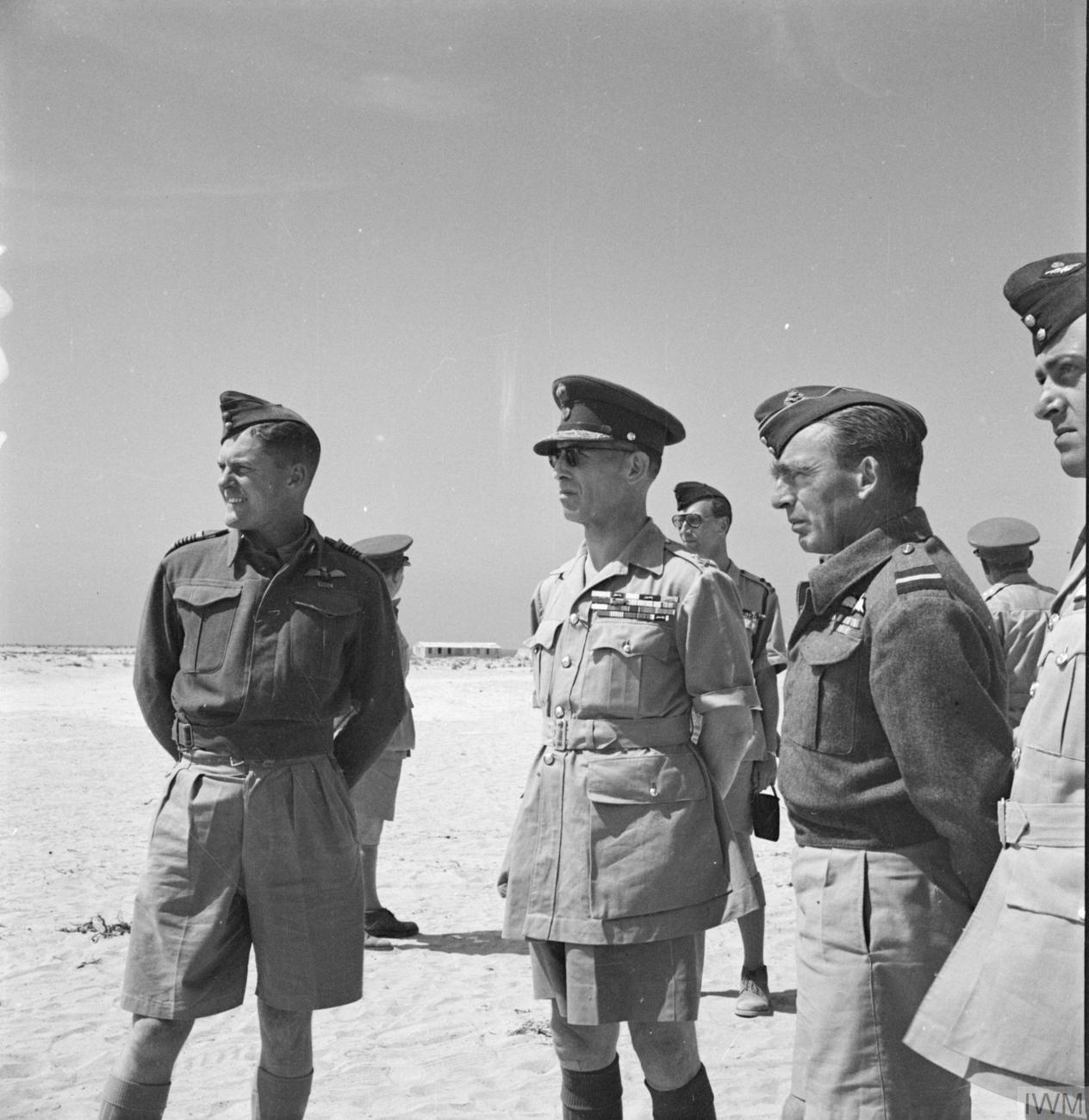
George II during his visit to a Greek fighter station, 1944

In occupied Greece, however, the leftist partisans of the National Liberation Front (EAM) and National Popular Liberation Army (ELAS), now unfettered by Metaxas's oppression, had become the largest Greek Resistance movement, enjoying considerable popular support. As liberation drew nearer however, the prospect of George's return caused dissensions both inside Greece and among the Greeks abroad. Although he effectively renounced the Metaxas regime in a radio broadcast, a large section of the people and many politicians rejected his return on account of his support of the dictatorship. In November 1943, George wrote to Tsouderos, "I shall examine anew the question of the date of my return to Greece in agreement with the Government". Either deliberately or accidentally, the version released for publication omitted the words "of the date", creating the impression that George had agreed to a further plebiscite on the monarchy, even though a retraction was issued. After Italy joined the Allies on 8 September 1943, communists in Greece seized weapons of the Axis and gained territorial power within the country. There were growing calls for George to hold a referendum and appoint a regent before he returned to Greece. It was suggested that the regent be the Archbishop of Athens and All Greece, Archbishop Damaskinos, but as Damaskinos was a strong supporter of republicanism, George heavily opposed this. Communists became the monarchy's main political opponent: a rival communist-led government, called the Political Committee of National Liberation, was established in occupied Greece, and a pro-EAM mutiny occurred among the armed forces in the Middle East. On 8 April 1944, Tsouderis resigned and George appointed the liberal Sophoklis Venizelos. However, when Venizelos was discovered to have been involved in the mutiny, George appointed Georgios Papandreou as prime minister, and Papandreou selected a Cabinet made up of multiple republican ministers. It was agreed in the May 1944 Lebanon conference that the fate of the monarchy would be decided in a national referendum. George was very much opposed to a regency, and tried his best to turn Churchill against Archbishop Damaskinos, accusing him of being a communist and a Nazi collaborator.

Finally, Greece was liberated from the Axis. As late as Christmas Eve 1944, during the height of the Dekemvriana, George had rejected the compromise solution of a regency, demanding that he return to Greece at once to reclaim his throne. On 29 December 1944, at a meeting at 10 Downing Street, Churchill told the king "that if he did not agree to the matter would be settled without him, and that we should recognise the new government instead of him". George's private secretary recalled, "I could hear through the door the voices of Churchill and Eden, particularly the latter, raised in anger at the king. In this heated argument the door was flung open and the king stormed out, his face white and taut ... In the car as we drove back to the hotel the King would not trust himself to speak; after recovering his composure he went back to Downing Street and informed Churchill and Eden that had no choice but to acquiesce to their demands". Bowing to pressure, George was forced to appoint Archbishop Damaskinos of Athens as regent in January 1945. Damaskinos immediately appointed a republican-dominated government. Ailing, exhausted and powerless, George bought a lease on a house in Chester Square, Belgravia, and made a home there with Wallach, his long-time mistress.

=== Return to Greece ===
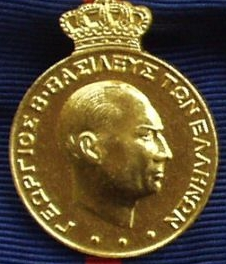
Greek medal with George II

Though World War II was over, political instability in Greece remained very high. There was tension and violence between communists and British forces, commanded by General Ronald Scobie. On 31 March 1946, under the surveillance of the American, British and French governments, the 1946 Greek legislative election was held and the United Alignment of Nationalists, a royalist party, won a strong majority of seats, aided by the abstention of the communists, and the 1946 Greek referendum on the monarchy was set for 1 September. Between then and the referendum, the electoral registers were revised under Allied supervision. The announced results claimed 68.4% in favour of George's return on an 86.6% turnout. However, even Allied observers acknowledged that the official results were marked by significant fraud by monarchist supporters. The official Allied observation report recorded, "There is no doubt in our minds that the party representing the government view exercised undue influence in securing votes in support of the return of the King."

The new prime minister, Konstantinos Tsaldaris, went to London to invite George II back to Greece. On 27 September, George returned to Elefsina, Greece, and met with Paul and Frederica. From there, they and other members of the royal family travelled to Athens and were greeted by a large crowd and a Te Deum, celebrated by Damaskinos. Despite democracy being restored, the Greek population were still heavily suffering from the war. Van der Kiste estimates that 77% of the naval fleet was destroyed, 95% of railways destroyed and over 300 villages ransacked. George returned to find Tatoi Palace looted, the surrounding woods chopped down for fuel and corpses buried in shallow graves outside. His country also faced economic collapse.

With his residencies having been badly damaged, George moved into a cottage built for his father. His sister, Catherine, lived with him there as well with her staff. George attempted to depict his lifestyle as modest during a time of high rationing, and spent most of his time working in his office and opening letters addressed to him. While the Greek Civil War began raging in the north, the Paris Peace Treaties on 10 February 1947 allows Greece to annex the Dodecanese islands, which had been Italian territories since the Italo-Turkish War between 1911 and 1912. George proclaimed Admiral Perikles Ioannidis, the second husband of his aunt, Maria, as the first governor of the Dodecanese. George also aimed to annex Northern Epirus and a resolution vote by the American Senate approved this, but he was ultimately unsuccessful.

== Death ==
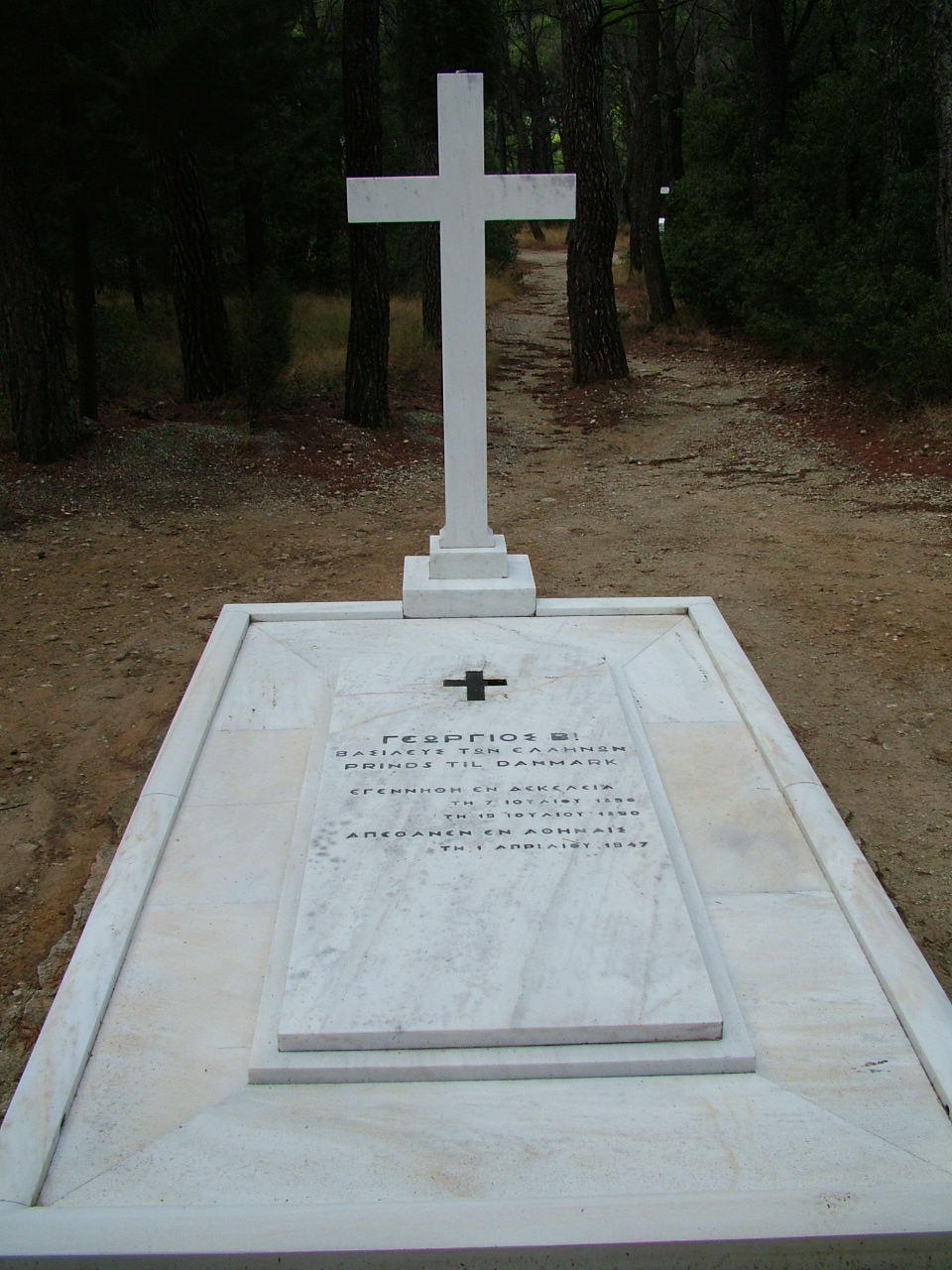
George II's grave

From the announcement of Princess Katherine's engagement to British Major Richard Brandram, George's health began declining without his doctors being concerned. On 31 March 1947, George attended a performance of Laurence Olivier's Henry V at the British embassy in Athens as part of a charity gala. At lunch the following day, George told a servant that he felt tired. He was then discovered unconscious in his office in the New Royal Palace in Athens on 1 April 1947. At 4:00 pm, George's death was announced on the radio and his cause of death was given as arteriosclerosis. When the news was announced some thought it to be an April Fool's Day joke. His funeral was held on 6 April at the Metropolitan Cathedral of Athens and he was buried at Tatoi Palace. He was succeeded by his younger brother, Paul. George's nephew, Constantine, thus became the crown prince.

== In popular culture ==
=== War propaganda ===
During World War II, the Allies used the figure of George II as an instrument of propaganda to reinforce Greek patriotic sentiment. Several short films centred on the sovereign and his government were thus shot, such as Heroic Greece! by the American Frank Norton (1941).

=== Television and literature ===
The romantic relationship of King George II and his mistress, nicknamed "Mrs. Brown", is briefly mentioned in the third episode ("The New King") of the British mini-series Edward & Mrs. Simpson, which features the king's cruise with Edward VIII and Wallis Simpson in the Greek Islands, in 1936. In addition, George is depicted in the English detective novel, A Royal Affair (1920), by Allisan Montclair.

=== Music ===
On the occasion of the restoration of George II as monarch in 1935, the rebetiko singer Markos Vamvakaris wrote a song titled "We welcome you, King" (Greek: Καλώς μας ήρθες Bασιλιά, romanized: Kalós mas írthes Vasiliá).

=== Philately ===
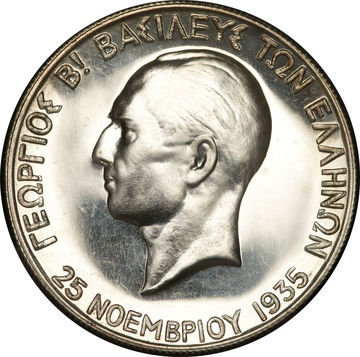
Coin to celebrate the fifth anniversary of the restoration of the monarchy, 1940

Various stamps bearing the effigy of George II have been issued by Greek Post during his reign:

- A series of four stamps depicting the sovereign was thus issued, shortly after his restoration to the throne, on 1 November 1937, with face values of ₯1, ₯3, ₯8 and ₯100.
- A series of four stamps were issued in 1947 upon George's return to Greece after World War II.
- A commemorative stamp depicting George above Crete was issued in 1950 in memoriam the Battle of Crete.
- Two stamps were released in 1956 and 1957 that showcased each Greek monarch.
- A series of five stamps were released in 1963 to mark the centenary of the Greek monarchy. Each Greek monarch was depicted.

=== Numismatics ===
Various Greek coins bearing the image of George II have been issued by the Bank of Greece. Among these are:

- A series of commemorative coins minted in 1940 to celebrate the fifth anniversary of the king's restoration (₯20 and ₯100 coins struck in copper, silver and gold bearing the date of 25 November 1935).
- A ₯30 silver coin put into circulation in 1963 on the occasion of the centenary of the Greek monarchy and showing the portraits of kings George I, Constantine I, Alexander I and George II and Paul I.

== Honours ==
- Kingdom of Greece:
  - Founder of the Order of St. George and St. Constantine, January 1936
  - Founder of the Order of Saints Olga and Sophia, January 1936
  - Commander's cross of the Cross of Valour, 28 October 1946
- Denmark:
  - Knight of the Elephant, with Collar, 15 August 1909
  - Cross of Honour of the Order of the Dannebrog, 15 August 1909
- France: Grand Cross of the Legion of Honour, 10 December 1892
- (Kingdom of Italy) House of Savoy: Knight of the Annunciation, with Collar and Star
- Monaco : Grand Cross of the Order of Saint-Charles, 11 April 1940
- Poland: Knight of the White Eagle
- Norway: War Cross Medal
- Romania: Collar of the Order of Carol I
- Sweden: Knight of the Seraphim, 20 May 1919
- United Kingdom:
  - Honorary Grand Cross of the Royal Victorian Order, 20 July 1909
  - Stranger Knight Companion of the Garter, 7 November 1938
  - Associate Bailiff Grand Cross of St. John
  - Companion of the Distinguished Service Order

== Ancestry ==
Ancestors of George II of Greece

8. Christian IX of Denmark
4. George I of Greece
9. Princess Louise of Hesse-Kassel
2. Constantine I of Greece
10. Grand Duke Constantine Nikolaevich of Russia
5. Grand Duchess Olga Constantinovna of Russia
11. Princess Alexandra of Saxe-Altenburg
1. George II of Greece
12. Wilhelm I, German Emperor
6. Frederick III, German Emperor
13. Princess Augusta of Saxe-Weimar-Eisenach
3. Princess Sophie of Prussia
14. Prince Albert of Saxe-Coburg and Gotha
7. Victoria, Princess Royal
15. Queen Victoria of the United Kingdom

== Sources ==
- Bertin, Célia (1982). Marie Bonaparte (in French). Paris: Perrin. ISBN 2-2620-1602X.
- Brewer, David (2016). Greece, The Decade of War: Occupation, Resistance, and Civil War. I.B. Tauris. ISBN 978-1780768540.
- Buckley, Christopher (1984). Greece and Crete 1941. London: P. Efstathiadis & Sons S.A. ISBN 9-6022-60416.
- Cassavetti, D. J. (1914). Hellas and the Balkan Wars. London: Fisher Unwin.
- Clogg, Richard (July 1979). "The Greek Government-in-Exile 1941–4". The International History Review. 1 (3). Cambridge University Press: 376–98. doi:10.1080/07075332.1979.9640190.
- Clogg, Richard (1992). A Short History of Modern Greece. Cambridge University Press. ISBN 0-5213-28373.
- Dimitrakis, Panagiotis (2009). Greece and the English, British Diplomacy and the Kings of Greece. London: Tauris Academic Studies. ISBN 978-1-8451-1821-1.
- Divo, Jean-Paul (1969). Modern Greek Coins, 1828–1968: A Detailed Description of Every Known Greek and Cretan Coin from the Time of Capodistrias Until the Present Time, with Valuations. Numismatic Department Bank Lev. pp. 81–82.
- Driault, Édouard; Lhéritier, Michel (1926). Histoire diplomatique de la Grèce de 1821 à nos jours (in French). Vol. V. PUF. ISBN 2-2180-38412.
- Kennedy, Dane Keith (2016). Decolonization: A Very Short Introduction. England: Oxford University Press.
- Gamberini, Giordano (1975). Mille volti di massoni (in Italian). Erasmo. p. 233.
- Gelardi, Julia (2006). Born to Rule: Granddaughters of Victoria, Queens of Europe. Headline Review. ISBN 0-7553-13925.
- Hawoldar, Shakuntala (1943). Current Biography.
- Kalapothakos, Nikos (2007). Απο το κομπολοι στο ρολοι: μια εσωτερικη ιστορια του ρεμπετικου [From rosaries to rolls: an inside history of the rebetiko] (in Greek). Ekdoseis Armos. p. 43. ISBN 9789605274115.
- Karamitsos, A. (2008). Hellas stamp catalogue. Vol. 1.
- Koliopoulos, Ioannis S. (1976–1977). "Η στρατιωτική και πολιτική κρίση στην Ελλάδα τον Απρίλιο του 1941" [The Military and Political Crisis in Greece in April 1941] (PDF). Μνήμων (in Greek). 6: 53–74. doi:10.12681/mnimon.174.
- Mateos Sáinz de Medrano, Ricardo (2004). La Esfera de los Libros (ed.). Jorge II: una vida de contratiempos. Madrid. pp. 182–93. ISBN 8-4973-41953.
- Montclair, Allison (2021). Un mariage royal. Éditions 10/18. ISBN 978-2264077851.
- Mavrogordatos, George (2016). 1915, Εθνικός Διχασμός [1915, National Schism] (in Greek). εκδόσεις Πατάκη. ISBN 978-960-16-6498-9.
- Pakula, Hannah (1996). The Last Romantic: A Biography of Queen Marie of Romania. Weidenfeld & Nicolson History. ISBN 1-8579-98162.
- Palmer, Alan; Greece, Michael of (1990). The Royal House of Greece. Weidenfeld Nicolson Illustrated. ISBN 0-2978-30600.
- Papacosma, S. Victor (1977). The Military in Greek Politics: The 1909 Coup d'Etat. Kent (Ohio): Kent State University Press. ISBN 0-8733-82080.
- Regina Maria a Romaniei (2006) [1930]. Însemnari zilnice [Daily notes] (in Romanian). Vol. 3. Editura Historia.
- Tronstad, Leif (2011). Recipients of the Norwegian War Cross with Sword: Olav V of Norway, Haakon VII of Norway, George II of Greece. abebooks.com. ISBN 978-1233121632.
- Van der Kiste, John (1994). Kings of the Hellenes: The Greek Kings, 1863–1974. Sutton Publishing.
- Vacalopoulos, Apostolos (1975). History of Modern Greece (in French). Horvath. ISBN 2-7171-00571.
- Vatikiotis, Panayiotis J. (1998). Popular Autocracy in Greece, 1936–41: A Political Biography of General Ioannis Metaxas. Frank Cass Publishers. ISBN 978-0-7146-4445-5.
- Vickers, Hugo (2000). Alice, Princess Andrew of Greece. Hamish Hamilton. ISBN 0-2411-36865.
- Wansell, Geoffrey (2012) [1995]. Terence Rattigan: A Biography. London: St. Martin's Press. ISBN 978-1-84943-267-2.
- Wattel, M. & B. (2009). Les Grand'Croix de la Légion d'honneur de 1805 à nos jours. Titulaires français et étrangers. Paris: Archives & Culture. p. 467. ISBN 978-2350771359.
- Zarkovic Bookman, Milica (1997). The Demographic Struggle for Power: The Political Economy of Demographic Engineering in the Modern World. Routledge. p. 245. ISBN 0714647322.

George II of Greece House of Schleswig-Holstein-Sonderburg-Glücksburg Cadet branch of the House of Oldenburg Born: 19 July 1890 Died: 1 April 1947
Regnal titles
Preceded by Constantine I	King of the Hellenes; 27 September 1922 – 25 March 1924	Vacant Monarchy abolished
Vacant Republic ended	King of the Hellenes; 3 November 1935 – 1 April 1947	Succeeded by Paul
