= Stelios Dimitrakakis =

Stelios Dimitrakakis (also known as Stylianos Dimitrakakis and Στυλιανός Δημητρακάκης) was born in Chania in 1903 and was the son of Rethymnon's judge and Minister of Parliament, Markos Dimitrakakis from 1864 to 1916. He studied law in Athens and political science in Paris.

== Political career and honors ==
In 1929, he was appointed prefect of the Greek state of Drama, where he held substantial power until 1932. In 1941 he was the active minister of justice as part of the Tsouderos government and the Greek government in exile during Nazi occupation from April 21, 1941 - May 2, 1942. Dimitrakakis was then appointed as temporary minister of the army from June 2, 1941 to May 2, 1942, and Minister of Justice and Labour, where he remained until April 14, 1944. He was instrumental in orchestrating the Greek brigades that are widely credited with freeing Crete of Nazi occupation during WWII through several operations that originated from the South of Crete and Cairo, Egypt, known as the Battle of Crete.

== Personal life ==
He died on March 7, 1947, at the age of 44. Since then the central road leading to the Rethmynon Town Hall is named in his honor, where it remains today.
