= 4th of August Regime =

Greek military dictatorship (1936 to 1941)

Kingdom of Greece Βασίλειον τῆς Ἑλλάδος Vasílion tis Elládos
- 1936–1941
- State flag Coat of arms
- Motto: Eleftheria i Thanatos; Ελευθερία ή θάνατος "Freedom or Death"
- Anthem: Ýmnos is tin Eleftherían; Ὕμνος εἰς τὴν Ἐλευθερίαν "Hymn to Freedom"
- Unofficial emblem

- Capital and largest city: Athens
- Common languages: Greek language
- Religion: Greek Orthodox
- Demonyms: Greek, Hellene
- Government: Military dictatorship
- King
  - 1936–1941: George II
- Prime Minister
  - 1936–1941: Ioannis Metaxas
  - 1941: Alexandros Koryzis
  - 1941: George II
  - 1941: Emmanouil Tsouderos
- History
  - Established: 4 August 1936
  - Italian invasion: 28 October 1940
  - Death of Metaxas: 29 January 1941
  - German invasion: 6 April 1941
  - Death of Koryzis: 18 April 1941
  - Greek surrender: 23 April 1941
- Currency: Greek drachma
Preceded by	Succeeded by
Kingdom of Greece	Greek government-in-exile; Hellenic State
- Today part of: Greece

The 4th of August Regime (Greek: Καθεστώς της 4ης Αυγούστου, romanized: Kathestós tis tetártis Avgoústou), commonly also known as the Metaxas regime (Καθεστώς Μεταξά, Kathestós Metaxá), was a dictatorial regime under the leadership of General Ioannis Metaxas that ruled the Kingdom of Greece from 1936 to 1941.

On 4 August 1936, Metaxas, with the support of King George II, suspended the Greek parliament and went on to preside over a conservative, staunchly anti-communist and ultranationalist government under the ideology of Metaxism, which has been described either as an authoritarian conservative non-fascist system or, in more recent studies, as a Greek variation of fascism; (Note: The 4th of August Regime synthesized elements of authoritarian conservatism—such as its reverence for the Orthodox Church—with fascist aesthetics, organizational methods, and ideological influences. Metaxas’s promotion of a "Third Hellenic Civilization" echoes similar narratives of national rebirth seen in the "Third Rome" (Fascist Italy) and the "Third Reich" (Nazi Germany), aligning with the fascist concept of national palingenesis. Thus, while Metaxas himself may not have been a fascist, there is a strong argument that the regime he led bore the hallmarks of fascism.) a middle position is that it was a regime with a strong Fascist component or a para-fascist regime. Metaxas himself and some contemporary historians have described the government as totalitarian. In its symbolism and rhetoric, the regime took inspiration from Fascist Italy, but it retained close links to Britain and the French Third Republic, rather than the Axis powers.

Being non-partisan, after Metaxas' death in January 1941, the regime hinged entirely on the King. Although Greece was occupied following the German invasion of Greece in April 1941 and the Greek government was forced to go into exile in the British-controlled Kingdom of Egypt, several prominent figures of the regime, notably the notorious security chief Konstantinos Maniadakis, survived in cabinet for several months until the King was forced to dismiss them in accordance with a compromise with the representatives of the old democratic political establishment.

== Origins of the regime ==
Metaxas imposed his regime primarily to fight the turbulent social situation prevalent in Greece in the 1930s, in which political factionalization had disrupted Greek parliamentary democracy. The sinking credibility of the Parliament was accompanied by several coup attempts; a Venizelist putsch failed in March 1935, and in the following October, elections reinforced the Royalist majority, which allowed the exiled King George II to return to Greece.

The king re-established the monarchy in the country, but the parliament, split into incompatible factions, was unable to shape a clear political majority and form a government. Meanwhile, the increasing activity of the Communists, whose 15 deputies from the 1936 elections held the balance between 143 Monarchists and 142 Liberals, Agrarians, and Republicans, created a deadlock.

In May 1936, widespread agrarian unrest among tobacco farmers and industrial unrest in the north of the country erupted, which eventually brought General Metaxas to suspend the parliament on the eve of a major strike, on 4 August 1936. Endorsed by the King, Metaxas declared a state of emergency, decreed martial law, annulled various articles of the constitution, and established a crisis cabinet to put an end to the unrest and to restore the social order. In one of his first speeches, Metaxas announced that the new regime represented a "colossal change for Greece."

Thus the Metaxas dictatorship was born, and the period of time which would follow was named after the day Metaxas rose to absolute power: 4 August. The new regime was backed by small extremist political parties, and by conservatives expecting a crackdown on the communists.

=== Classical influences ===
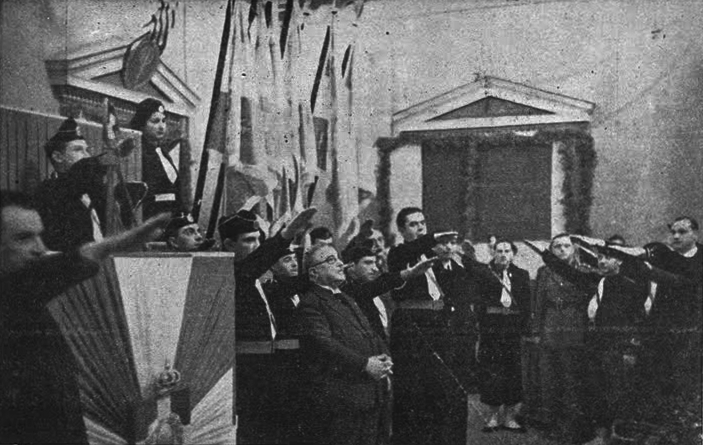
Young members of the Greek National Organisation of Youth (EON) give the fascist salute to Ioannis Metaxas.

The roots of Metaxas' "New State" were sought in Greece's classical history. Metaxas thought Greek nationalism would galvanize "the heathen values of ancient Greece, specifically those of Sparta, along with the Eastern Orthodox Christian values of the Medieval empire of Byzantium". Ancient Macedonia was also glorified as the first political unifier of the Hellenes. As its main symbol, the youth organization of the regime chose the labrys/pelekys, the symbol of ancient Minoan Crete.

The traditional Greek values of "Country, Loyalty, Family and Religion", which Metaxas praised repeatedly, were also close to those of the ancient Spartans. The regime promoted the perceived Spartan ideals of self-discipline, militarism and collective sacrifice, while Byzantium provided an emphasis on a centralized state and devotion to the monarchy and Greek Orthodox Church.

=== External influences ===
Metaxas considered António Salazar's Estado Novo of Portugal his main inspiration and surrounded himself with elements from this and other dictatorial regimes of the time. Thus, his main ideological slogan was also "New State" (Neon Kratos) and 4 August regime used its own military-like uniforms, greetings, songs and rituals, including the Roman salute (which Metaxas considered Greek in origin as a salutation to the sun god Apollo, and he referred to it as the "Hellenikos Hairetismos" ("Hellenic Hailing")).

Metaxas' regime also developed characteristics typical of authoritarian states such as 1930s Italy and Germany: the regime's propaganda presented Metaxas as "the First Peasant", "the First Worker" and as "the National Father" of the Greeks. Like his contemporaries Hitler with Führer and Mussolini with Duce, Metaxas adopted the title of Archigos, Greek for "leader" or "chieftain", and claimed that his regime had to lay the foundations for the appearance of a glorious "Third Hellenic Civilization" combining the best of ancient Greece and the Greek Byzantine Empire of the Middle Ages.

== Greek totalitarianism ==
The Metaxas regime sought to comprehensively change Greece, and therefore instituted controls on Greek society, politics, language, and the economy. In each of these policy areas, the Metaxas government seemed more nearly an anticipation of Francoist Spain than to resemble its contemporaries Nazi Germany or Fascist Italy.

Greece since the 4th of August became an anticommunist State, an antiparliamentary State, a totalitarian State. A State based on its farmers and workers, and so antiplutocratic. There is not, of course, a particular party to govern. This party is all the People, except of the incorrigible communists and the reactionary old parties politicians.

=== Attempts at social control ===
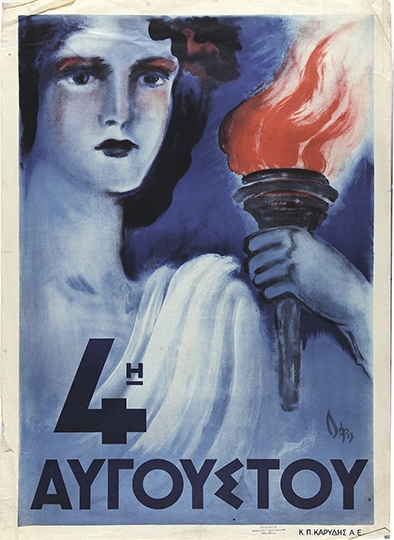
Propaganda poster of the regime

Having come to power intent on restoring public order, Metaxas' state largely achieved this goal, under the supervision of what can be described as its most fascist member, minister of public order Konstantinos Maniadakis. Maniadakis created a second fake "communist party", published a fake Rizospastis and achieved the dissolution of all the communist organizations.

Metaxas' policies such as the censorship of the media, the banning of political parties and prohibition of strikes copied contemporary European authoritarian regimes. As its far-right contemporaries Italy and Germany, the Greek State also had its political police force, the Asfaleia, based upon the Gestapo (its chief Maniadakis maintained a close relationship with Himmler on methods and techniques). The objective of Asfaleia was to secure public order.

The regime also repressed the rebetiko music due to the uncompromising lyrics and favoured the traditional Greek folk music. Hashish dens, baglamas and bouzouki were banned, or at least playing in the eastern-style manner and scales. Probably inspired by the Völkisch movement, a massive promotion of the Greek folk music took place, though the radio and public festivals, mainly because of the animosity of the state towards the bouzoukis and the rebetiko music. On this point the Greek communist left agreed, considering the rebetiko as "reactionary".

Soon after its inception the regime severely repressed the communists and leftists. About 15,000 people were arrested and jailed, or exiled for political reasons; some were subjected to torture. Metaxas' regime forced the Communist party underground, and also attempted to dismantle the old system of loyalties of the Royalist and Venizelist parties. Those major forces however remained, as they had for the preceding decades, and re-emerged immediately after the four-year Metaxas regime.

While Metaxas' regime did play up the communist threat in order to justify its repression, the regime is not known to have committed political murders and did not instate the death penalty. Dissidents were, rather, usually banished to tiny islands in the Aegean Sea. For example, the liberal leader George Papandreou was exiled to Andros. The Greek Communist Party (KKE), meanwhile, which had already been outlawed, remained intact. Legal restrictions against it finally were ended in 1974 during metapolitefsi.

=== Arts and culture ===
Metaxas was educated in the German Empire and admired German culture. He supported the arts (theatrical, literary, musical, visual arts, etc.). He collaborated with significant intellectual figures of the era, like Stratis Myrivilis, Nikos Kazantzakis, Angelos Sikelianos, Manolis Kalomoiris, Angelos Terzakis, "Nelly's" (Elli Seraidari), and others, to promote the ideas of the regime, especially to the youth.

Another notable policy was the use and promotion of Demotic Greek (Demotiki) in the educational system (but in a conservative form), instead of Katharevousa. Manolis Triantafyllidis was appointed to create the Demotic grammar used.

=== The role of the youth ===
EON on parade (from its official magazine Neolaia). The double axe, emblem of the organisation, is visible on the standard.

The emblem of EON.

The flag which was used by EON during the Fourth of August regime.

In order to keep and maintain the values of the regime in future years, Metaxas gave birth to the Ethniki Organosi Neolaias (Εθνική Οργάνωση Νεολαίας, National Organisation of Youth, EON).

The EON brought together youths of all economic and social strata into one single body. Boys' education emphasized discipline and physical training, while girls were taught to become supportive wives and caring mothers to breed a stronger, healthier new generation. The EON published a fortnightly magazine called Neolaia (Νεολαία, Greek for "Youth"), which had much influence both in schools and in higher education.

Metaxas' vision was to create, through the youth, the "Third Hellenic Civilization", a continuity of the ancient Greek and Byzantine civilization.

The EON was disbanded by the German-Italian occupying authority in Greece following its vigorous resistance of the invasion.

=== Nationalism ===
As in most other totalitarian regimes, 4 August regime adopted a strong nationalistic program: although Metaxas was opposed to the invasion of Asia Minor as part of the Megali Idea, he used strong nationalist language concerning Greek minorities in neighbouring countries and in answering threats from Greece's neighbours in the still volatile southeast Europe. As with many nation states at the time, he used language exalting his people's race.

Ethnic and linguistic minorities (mainly Slavic-speakers of Greek Macedonia) were persecuted under Metaxas' rule. The regime, however, was tolerant to the Greek Jews, repealing the anti-Semitic laws of previous regimes. A large community of Sephardic Jews was present in the region of Thessaloniki which was annexed by Greece in 1913, and Jews were largely in opposition to Venizelism. Metaxas was firmly opposed to the irredentist factions of the Slavophones of northern Greece (most of whom were Bulgarians), some of whom underwent political persecution due to advocacy of irredentism with regard to neighbouring countries.

Metaxas' regime continued repression of the use of Slavic languages both in public and in private and of expressions of Slavic cultural distinctiveness. During World War II, the Greek-identifying Slavophones fought in the Hellenic Army in defense of Greece, whereas those who didn't, collaborated with the occupational forces following Greece's capitulation.

Again, in contrast to some totalitarian regimes, no mass killings were ever instituted and there is no evidence that any were planned.

=== Economic policy ===
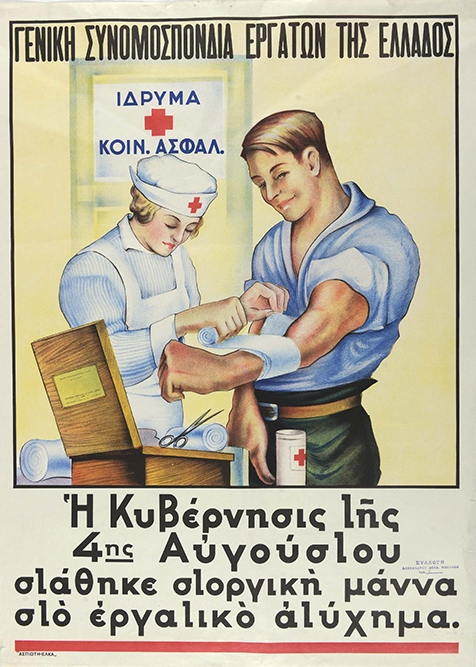
Poster of the Metaxas regime and the General Confederation of Greek Workers promoting the Social Insurance Institute (IKA)

One of 4 August government's main objectives was the repudiation of the old capitalist system and its replacement with a corporatist economic system in order to promote national and social solidarity. This idea "harmonized perfectly with Metaxas' convictions on social and national solidarity as well as his rejection of individualism and class struggle". The plan for the creation of a corporatist state was manifest in the early days of the regime by public declarations by Metaxas and by government ministers.

To this end, Deputy Premier and Finance Minister Konstantinos Zavitsianos "published details about a horizontal (according to branches of production), not vertical (according to social class), syndicalist organization" of the state. However, due to the external crisis with Italy, the plan had to be temporarily postponed with the result that it never fully materialized.

Metaxas' government, initially unpopular, also gained popularity through an elaborate program to socialize the Greek economy, including:

- Unemployment insurance.
- Μaternity leave.
- A five-day, 40-hour workweek.
- Guaranteed two-week vacations with pay (or two weeks' double pay in place of vacation).
- Stricter work safety standards.

Many elements of this program persist in Greek economic policy. Metaxas' regime founded the Workers' Center (Εργατικό Κέντρο), which was established to look after workers' housing and recreation, among other things.

The 4th of August regime initially stabilized the drachma, which had been suffering from high inflation. Exploiting the newfound solidity of the currency, Metaxas' government embarked on large public works programs (such as the Ellinikon International Airport), including land drainage, construction of railways, road improvements, and modernization of the telecommunications infrastructure.

Metaxas' economic program met with initial success, with a marked rise in per capita income and temporary decline in unemployment in Greece between 1936 and 1938 (unemployment skyrocketed after 1938). Capitalizing on this success, the government instituted debt relief for farmers and instituted price floors on some agricultural goods to redistribute wealth to the countryside.

Also, on the legislation sector the Greek civil code, was finally completed by a jurist commission; a plan pending since the years of Otto of Greece.

=== Other ===
Another organization established by the regime was for the first time a state radio station; the YRE (today ERT), suitable also for the propaganda of the regime.

Also, during the years of the regime, the first law was made to establish the National parks of Greece, as an example of the physiolatry, promoted by the regime. However, during these years, Ilissos river was covered in Athens.

== Differences from other far-right regimes ==
There is some debate over the regime's relationship to other far-right regimes of the 1930s, especially Fascist Italy and Nazi Germany. Some of the main and important differences of Metaxas' regime as compared to other far-right governments include:

- The anti-imperialist speech of the regime.
- The pro-Jewish stance of Metaxas and tolerance to religious minorities.
- Absence of a mass political base for the regime, in the form of a political party or movement.
- No representative architecture or monuments.

== The end of the 4th of August regime ==
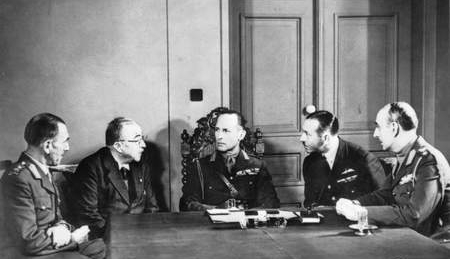
Ioannis Metaxas with King George II and Alexandros Papagos during a meeting of the Anglo-Greek War Council.

Foreign policy was one of the main concerns of 4 August regime. Metaxas, who had studied in Germany as a youth, was pro-German, while the King was pro-British. This caused heated discussions between the two, but the reality of 1930s Europe was that Greece's security depended less on Germany than on her traditional ally and protector, the United Kingdom, which was the Great Power dominating the Eastern Mediterranean Sea with her fleet. In addition, Italian leader Benito Mussolini's grandiose schemes to build a new Roman Empire in the Mediterranean directly clashed with Greek pretensions to control the Aegean Sea and the Dodecanese islands (then under Italian control) and to exert stronger influence in Albania.

As tensions and threat of war increased in Europe just before World War II, the situation was almost exactly the same as the position before World War I, when Greece had strong pro-German affinities in government, but it depended on Great Britain for its security. Most observers were anticipating Greece would attempt to remain neutral. Metaxas indeed attempted to maintain strict neutrality, but Italian expansionism eventually led to an Italian ultimatum and to the Greco-Italian War. However, Greek forces repelled the Italian invasion completely and pushed the Italians back into Albania, where the invasion had been launched. In fact, some territories in Albania where the Greek minority lives were claimed to be 'alliberated' and Metaxas' plans were to unite them with the rest of Greece.

Metaxas died suddenly in January 1941 in uncertain circumstances. His death raised hopes of a liberalization of his regime and the restoration of parliamentary rule, but King George quashed these hopes when he retained the regime's machinery in place. In the meantime, Germany entered the Battle of Greece through Yugoslavia and Bulgaria on April 6, 1941. Metaxas' successor Prime Minister Alexandros Koryzis, committed suicide on April 18, 1941, when the Germans approached Athens. On April 27, 1941, Athens was occupied by the Germans.

Despite British assistance, by the end of May, the Germans had overrun most of the country. The 4th of August regime collapsed on May 29, 1941. The King and the government escaped to Crete, where they stayed until the end of the Battle of Crete. They then transferred to Egypt, where a Greek government in exile was established. An alternative destination of Cyprus was rejected by the British, who feared that it might reinforce Greek claims on the island.

Meanwhile, in Greece a fascist puppet government was placed into power by the Axis powers.

== Legacy ==
As the Axis occupation ended, Greece descended into civil war between the communist-dominated forces of the left, operating in Greece and from bases in the south of Yugoslavia, and the U.S.- and UK-aligned forces of the political right. This was the first major protracted combat of the Cold War, one of the first exercises in U.S. policy of Containment, and a subject of the Truman Doctrine of U.S. President Harry S. Truman. The alignments were quite different from the Venizelist-Monarchist National Schism, as most Venizelists supported the right-wing alliance during the civil war.

== See also ==
- 4th of August Party
- 1938 Greek coup d'état attempt
- New Right (Greece)
- Regime of the Colonels
