= Michalis Kourmoulis =

Michalis Kourmoulis (Greek: Μιχάλης Κουρμούλης; 1765–1824) was a Greek leader of the Greek War of Independence from Crete and one of the major military leaders on the island during the war.

== Biography ==
Kourmoulis was originally known as Hussein Agha, and was the leader of an important Cretan family from Messara that was flourishing since the time of the Venetian rule over Crete. After the Ottoman conquest of Crete, the Kourmoulis family converted to Islam, producing several beys and aghas, but remaining Crypto-Christians in reality. Both Kourmoulis and his family protected the Christians of Dikti and Psiloritis region. In 1814, in response to the murder of some armed Ottomans, Kourmoulis was accused as a secret Christian, but managed to be acquitted.

He participated in the preparation of the Greek Revolution in Crete, being a member of the Filiki Eteria after being initiated by Gregorios Kallonas. During the Easter of 1821, while he was in Chania, he revealed in public his Christian faith. When the revolution broke out in Crete, he became head of his family, which numbered 75 armed men as well as head of the armed Greeks of Messara.

Initially, together with other local leaders he laid ambushes on the Ottoman forces in the Rethymno area, whilelater he temporarily fled to Kassos with other rebels, only to return later in Crete. His compatriots proposed him to Demetrios Ypsilantis as a candidate for the position of the general chief of Crete, but eventually Michail Komninos Afentoulief was selected by Ypsilantis. He was appointed as pentakosiarch and managed to repeatedly beat the Ottoman military officers, Sherif and Hassan Pasha. He was also one of the first leaders to set up a Greek cavalry unit. After the suppression of the revolution on the island by the Egyptian army, Michael Kourmoulis fled to Hydra where he died from his wounds in 1824. His brother Georgios and his son Dimitris offered important services in the Revolution.

== Bibliography ==
- Dionysios Kokkinos, Η Ελληνική Επανάστασις, εκδόσεις Μέλισσα, 6th edition, Athens, 1974.
