= Virginia Tsouderou =

Greek politician

- Born: June 24, 1924; Heraklion, Greece
- Died: June 11, 2018 (aged 93); Athens, Greece

Virginia Tsouderou (Greek: Βιργινία Τσουδερού; 24 June 1924 – 11 June 2018) was a Greek politician.

== Early life ==
Virginia Tsouderou was born in Heraklion, Crete on 24 June 1924. Her father, Emmanouil Tsouderos, was Prime Minister of the Greek government-in-exile between 1941 and 1944. She had a sister, Athina, and a brother Ioannis, who also became a politician.

She studied economics, philosophy and political science at the University of Oxford, finance at the University of Minnesota and regional development at the Harvard Radcliffe Institute. Between 1951 and 1955, she worked at the International Monetary Fund before returning to Greece, where she served as an editor at the newspapers Eleftheria and To Vima (1958–1967) and as an advisor to the government of Georgios Papandreou. During the Greek Military Junta she was briefly arrested and detained for opposition activities.

== Political career ==
In 1974 she was a founding member of the New Political Forces party and was elected as an MP the same year with the Centre Union – New Forces coalition party, representing the Athens B constituency. She was re-elected in 1977 and in 1979 was one of the founders of the Union of the Democratic Centre.

In the 1985 elections, she was elected as an MP with New Democracy, and was re-elected in 1989 and 1990. She served as president of the Government Committee for Thrace (1990) and president of the Interparty Committee for Thrace and the Aegean (1991). Between 1991 and 1993, she served as Deputy Minister of Foreign Affairs in the government of Konstantinos Mitsotakis.

She died on 11 June 2018 at the age of 93 and was buried in the First Cemetery of Athens.
