= National Youth Organisation (Greece) =

Greek youth organization (1936–1941)

National Youth Organization Εθνική Οργάνωσις Νεολαίας Ethnikí Orgánosis Neoléas
- Chairperson: Crown Prince Paul (since December 1938)
- Founded: 7 October 1936
- Dissolved: April 1941
- Ideology: Metaxism; Greek nationalism Christian nationalism Monarchism; Anti-communism

Flag

The National Youth Organisation (Greek: Εθνική Οργάνωσις Νεολαίας, romanized: Ethnikí Orgánosis Neoléas, EON) was a youth organization in Greece during the years of the Metaxas Regime (1936–1941), established by the regime with the stated goals of helping the youth in the productive spending of their free time and cultivating their national values and cooperative spirit.

== Membership ==
Membership was not mandatory, and—unlike most contemporary political youth organizations in Europe—EON was not affiliated with a political party, but there was widespread successful campaigning by the regime to include the largest part of the youth to EON, and later took over the scouts and other such organizations, although typically membership still remained strictly voluntary. However, only Christians could enroll and Muslims and Jews could not become EON members.

== Activities and publication ==
Some of the activities that EON members were involved in included athletics events, parades and marches, military training, reforestations, recycling.

The official monthly magazine of EON was The Youth (Greek: Η Νεολαία).

== Symbols ==
The emblem of EON was a labrys surrounded by laurel wreaths and topped with a royal crown, while the flag of EON was similar to the flag of Greece—featuring a white cross on a blue field- with the emblem of EON charged in the center in gold and the royal crown moved to the upper hoist side quadrant. The motto of EON was "One Nation, One King, One Leader, One Youth".

== WWII successor organisations ==
The EON disbanded in late April 1941 with the start of the German occupation of Greece when some of its former members created the secret occupation resistance/liberation organizations "National Youth Committee" and—the strictly female—"SPITHA" under the leadership of Metaxas' daughter Loukia Metaxa.

== See also ==
- Hitler youth
- Levente Associations
- Opera Nazionale Balilla
