= Ioannis Tsouderos =

Greek politician

- Born: 1923; Heraklion, Greece
- Died: 21 March 1997 (aged 73–74); Athens, Greece

Ioannis Tsouderos (Greek: Ιωάννης Τσουδερός; 1923 – 21 March 1997) was a Greek politician.

== Early life ==
Ioannis Tsouderos was born in Heraklion, Crete in 1923. His father, Emmanouil Tsouderos, was Prime Minister of the Greek government-in-exile between 1941 and 1944. He had two sisters, Athina and Virginia, the latter of whom also became a politician.

He studied sociology, Economics and Political Sciences at the University of Minnesota and participated as a paratrooper in military operations in Greece during World War II with the American army. After the war he worked as a university professor in the United States before returning to Greece in 1959.

== Political career ==
He was first elected as an MP for Rethymno in 1961 with the Centre Union, but left during the events of 1965. Subsequently, he became part of a group of defectors from the Centre Union to serve in the government of Stefanos Stefanopoulos, who appointed him Deputy Minister of Coordination. In 1974, following the restoration of democacy in Greece, he was elected as an MP with New Democracy.

Tsouderos appeared in the 1964 BBC documentary Greece Without Columns, presented by David Holden. In it, he claimed to spend 20,000 drachmas per month (equivalent to about 6,500 euros today) on baptisms, weddings and other social events in his constituency and that in the last three years alone he had baptized 700 children.

He was married to Margarita Paraskevopoulou and they had three children. He died on 21 March 1997 at the age of 74 and was buried in the First Cemetery of Athens.
