= Konstantinos Maniadakis =

Greek Army officer and politician

Konstantinos Maniadakis (Greek: Κωνσταντίνος Μανιαδάκης; July 25, 1893 in Sofiko, Corinthia – February 28, 1972 in Athens) was a Greek Army officer and politician who became notable as head of the internal security services of the dictatorial 4th of August Regime (1936–1941). A career engineers officer, Maniadakis resigned from the army in 1929. In 1936, dictator Ioannis Metaxas appointed him to head the Under-Ministry of Public Security. During his tenure, he managed to almost completely suppress and disorganize the Communist Party of Greece, imprisoning hundreds of its members and even publishing a government-controlled rival version of the party's newspaper, Rizospastis. Maniadakis as a Security Minister was regarded to be highly efficient against Communist policies in Greece. Following the German invasion of Greece, he continued in office in the early months of the Greek government in exile as Interior Minister, but was soon forced to resign. After World War II, he was elected several times to the Hellenic Parliament.
