= Alexandros Koryzis =

Greek politician (1885–1941)

- Αλέξανδρος Κορυζής
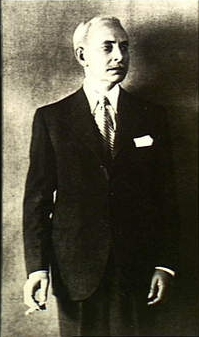

Prime Minister of Greece
- In office 29 January 1941 – 18 April 1941
- Monarch: George II
- Preceded by: Ioannis Metaxas
- Succeeded by: Emmanouil Tsouderos

Personal details
- Born: 1885 Poros, Greece
- Died: 18 April 1941 (aged 55–56) Athens, Greece
- Cause of death: Suicide by gunshot
- Party: Independent (Non-political)

Alexandros Koryzis (Greek: Αλέξανδρος Κορυζής; 1885 – 18 April 1941) was a Greek politician who served briefly as the prime minister of Greece in 1941.

== Career ==
Koryzis assumed this role on 29 January 1941, when his predecessor, the dictator Ioannis Metaxas died of throat cancer, during the Greco-Italian War. Prior to this, Koryzis had been governor of the Bank of Greece.

Koryzis was born on the small island of Poros in Greece, where a museum dedicated to his life and contribution exists today.

Prime Minister Metaxas had declined British offers of direct military assistance on the grounds that this could be used as a justification for German intervention in support of their Italian allies. Koryzis however agreed to the dispatch of "W Force" - a British and Dominion force of two infantry divisions and an armoured brigade.

Although largely powerless, as the government was effectively controlled by King George II, Koryzis still bore the burden of the German invasion which commenced on 6 April of the same year. Less than two weeks later, on 18 April, as German troops marched towards Athens and the city was placed under martial law, he shot himself. According to Theodore Stephanides, who was in Crete at the time, newspapers initially reported that the cause of his death was a heart attack, likely to avoid causing mass panic in Athens.

Political offices
Preceded by Ioannis Metaxas	Prime Minister of Greece; 29 January – 18 April 1941	Succeeded by Emmanouil Tsouderos
