= Greek government-in-exile =

Government-in-exile during World War II

- 1941–1944
- Flag from 1863-1973 Coat of arms
- Motto: «Ἐλευθερία ἢ Θάνατος» "Freedom or Death"
- Anthem: «Ὕμνος εἰς τὴν Ἐλευθερίαν» "Hymn to Freedom"
- Status: Government in exile
- Capital: Athens
- Capital-in-exile: Crete (1941); Cairo (1941); London (1941–43); Cairo (1943–44)
- Common languages: Greek
- Religion: Eastern Orthodox Church
- Government: Constitutional monarchy
- King
  - 1941–1944: George II
- Prime Minister
  - 1941–1944: Emmanouil Tsouderos
  - 1944: Sofoklis Venizelos
  - May-October 1944: Georgios Papandreou
- Historical era: World War II
  - Battle of Greece: 28 October 1940
  - Battle of Crete: 20 May 1941
  - Arrival at Cairo: 24 May 1941
  - Liberation of Greece: October 1944
Preceded by	Succeeded by
4th of August Regime	Kingdom of Greece

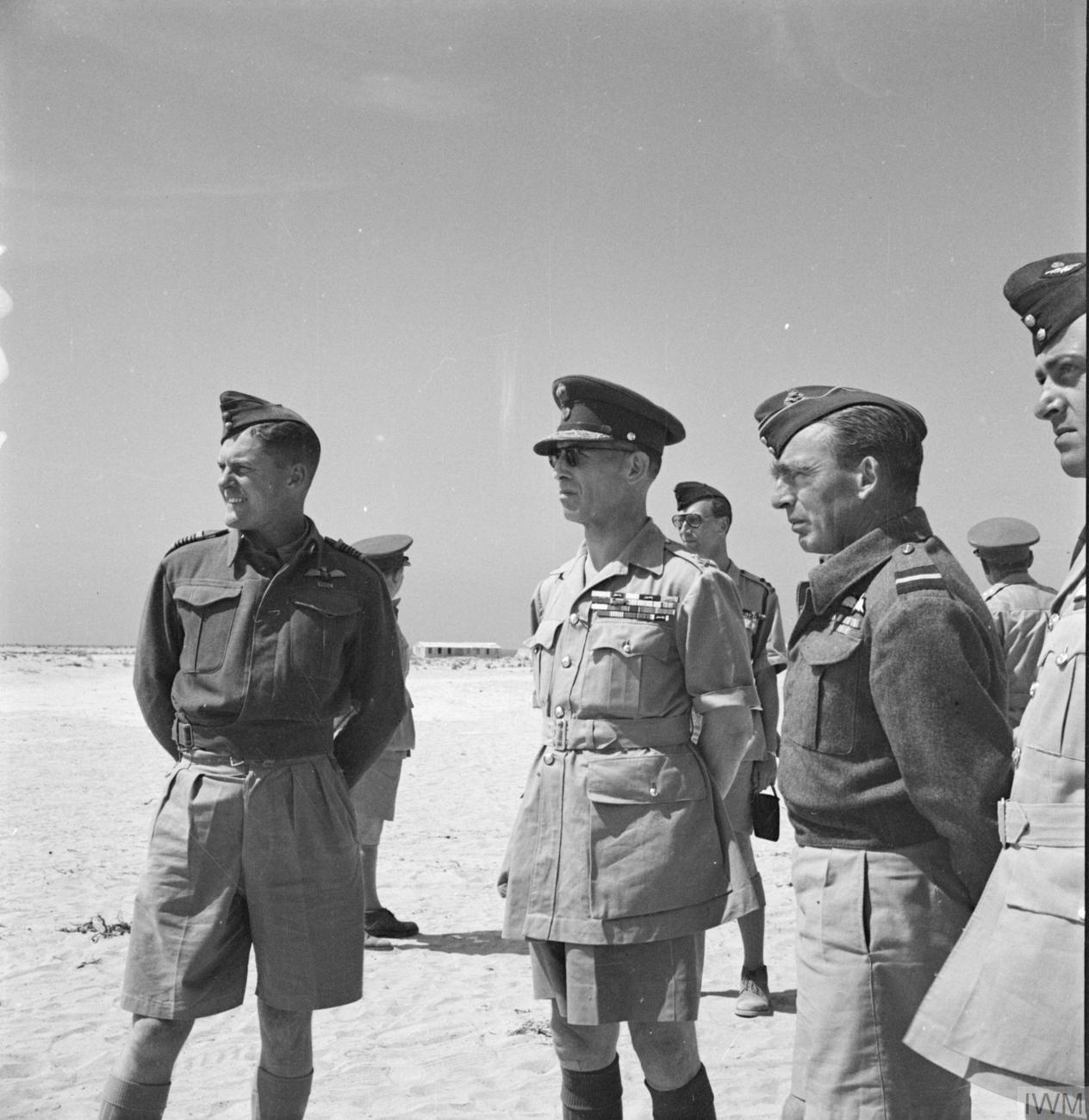
Members of the Greek government in exile, including King George II, on a visit to Greek units of the Royal Air Force

The Greek government-in-exile was formed in 1941, in the aftermath of the Battle of Greece and the subsequent occupation of Greece by Nazi Germany and Fascist Italy. The government-in-exile was based first in South Africa, then London, then, finally, from mid-1943, in Cairo, Egypt. There it came to be referred to as the "Cairo Government" (Greek: Κυβέρνηση του Καΐρου). It was the internationally recognised government during the years of the Axis occupation of Greece.

It was headed by King George II, who evacuated Athens in April 1941 after the German invasion of the country, first to the island of Crete and then to Cairo, then to South Africa and London before returning to Cairo. He remained there until the German occupying forces withdrew from the country on 17 October 1944.

The British wielded a significant amount of influence over the government-in-exile. Until 1944 it was also recognized as the legal Greek government by all Greek Resistance forces. In the occupied Greece, alongside the Axis-controlled collaborationist governments, a vigorous resistance movement developed. Its major force was the communist-controlled EAM/ELAS. During 1944, EAM/ELAS established a de facto separate administration, formalised in March 1944 after elections in both occupied and liberated territories, as the Political Committee of National Liberation (PEEA).

== History ==
As Athens was about to fall, the Greek prime minister, Alexandros Koryzis, shot himself in his office, and King George II offered the premiership to Alexandros Mazarakis – who declined the offer, for the King was unwilling to dismiss Konstantinos Maniadakis, the much-hated minister of public order under the 4th of August Regime. Under strong pressure from Sir Michael Palairet, the British minister in Athens, who wanted a more representative government than the 4th of August Regime, the King named Emmanouil Tsouderos prime minister on 21 April 1941. Tsouderos, a former governor of the Central Bank of Greece, was not a professional politician, being appointed only because he had been exiled under the Metaxas regime, which therefore allowed the King to claim to Palairet that he was broadening the cabinet. However, Tsouderos as prime minister proved reluctant to disassociate the government-in-exile from the 4th of August Regime legacy, moving very slowly and cautiously. On 25 April 1941, with the onset of the Battle of Greece, King George II and his government left the Greek mainland for Crete, which was attacked by Nazi forces on 20 May 1941. The Germans employed parachute forces in a massive airborne invasion and attacked the three main airfields of the island. After seven days of fighting and tough resistance, Allied commanders decided that the cause was hopeless and ordered a withdrawal from Sfakia.

During the night of May 24, King George II and his government were evacuated from Crete to Cairo. The government remained in Egypt until the withdrawal of German forces from Greece on October 17, 1944. The government had wanted to relocate to Cyprus, but following objections from the British Colonial Office, who complained that the majority of the Greek Cypriots would give their loyalty to the government-in-exile, Egypt was offered up as an alternative venue. In Egypt, there were considerable communities of ethnic Greeks living in Cairo and Alexandria, who tended to be Venizelist in their political sympathies and objected to the Metaxist ministers in the cabinet who however had the support of the King. The Greek communities in Egypt tended to very successful in businesses, playing an over-sized role in the Egyptian economy, and the government-in-exile was very much dependent on their financial support. On 2 June 1941, the King reluctantly dismissed Maniadakis as it became clear that the Greek communities in Egypt were unwilling to have anything to do with the government-in-exile as long as Maniadakis remained. One of the Venizelist leaders, Vyron Karapanagiotis, in a letter to Sofoklis Venizelos, complained that Maniadakis was "travelling with the luxurious entourage of an Indian potentate in South America". In exchange for dismissing Maniadakis, the King demanded in exchange that the British expel 6 leading Venizelist politicians who had escaped to Egypt, and inconveniently were all working closely with the Special Operations Executive (SOE) in organising resistance in Greece. As the Venizelist leaders all had "impeccable records of pro-British sympathies", the King's charge that they were pro-German was laughably absurd, and the six men were not expelled from Egypt.

E. G. Sebastian, the Foreign Office official in charge of dealing with the government-in-exile, reported on 23 September 1941: "Greeks of all shades of opinion are agreed upon the necessity of Greek government to make categorical statement without delay reinstating Constitution concerning freedom of the press and individual rights, abolished by Metaxas' regime. Majority of Greeks fail to understand why dictatorial methods of Metaxas have not been repudiated and fear their continuance after the war unless abolished now". The King moved slowly towards abolishing the 4th of August Regime; its end was proclaimed on 28 October 1941, and only in February 1942 did the King agree to restore articles 5, 6, 10, 12, 14, 20 and 95 of the 1911 constitution which had been suspended indefinitely on 4 August 1936. In May 1942, Panagiotis Kanellopoulos, the leader of the Ethnikon Enotikon Komma (Unity Party), escaped from Greece and upon his arrival was appointed war minister. As Kanellopoulos had been an opponent of the 4th of August Regime, his appointment as war minister was seen as a break with the past.

The government-in-exile relocated In July 1941 to Pretoria, South Africa, and in September 1941 to London. The ministry of war remained in Cairo throughout the war as the bulk of the Greek armed forces were in Egypt. In March 1943, the government-in-exile returned to Cairo. British officials assumed a dismissive attitude towards the Greek government-in-exile, with one Foreign Office civil servant writing that Greece was "an Egypt without a Cromer". The ambassador, Sir Reginald "Rex" Leeper spoke of Britain having the right of "friendly intervention" in Greek politics. Edward Warner of the Southern Department of the Foreign Office in a letter to Leeper wrote that "most of the upper class Greeks" were "self-seeking Levantines...quite unworthy of the rank and file". Harold Macmillan wrote in his diary on 21 August 1944 that the government-in-exile should move to Italy to escape "the poisonous atmosphere of intrigue which reigns at Cairo. All previous Greek Governments in exile have been broken in the bar of Shepheard's Hotel". In 1952 in his memoir of his war experiences Closing the Ring, Winston Churchill wrote that the Greeks were like the Jews in being the "most politically-minded race in the world who no matter how forlorn their circumstances or how grave the peril to their country are always divided into many parties, with many leaders who fight among themselves with desperate vigor".

As Greece had one of the world's largest merchant marines, and Britain was faced with the threat of starvation if the Kriegsmarine's U-boats could sink enough British shipping, the Greek merchant marine provided the government-in-exile with an asset to bargain with in its dealings with the British. A Foreign Official memorandum described keeping the Greek merchant marine in being engaged in bringing food to Britain as the most important issue in Anglo-Greek relations, and advised that when King George II visited London that he being treated as a major leader of the Allies. The memo noted that some Greek shipping tycoons were trying to keep their ships from being used on the dangerous North Atlantic run to bring food to Britain, and advised pressure to be applied on the government-in-exile to ensure that all of the Greek merchant marine be engaged in the war effort.

Throughout the occupation, a steady number of Greek politicians escaped to Egypt to serve in the government-in-exile, and the majority of these men were republican Venizelists. The SOE agent C.M. Woodhouse wrote: "The kind of Greeks who found it easiest to get on with the Germans were the kind of Greeks who found it easiest to get on with the old regime and therefore with the monarchy".

The SOE maintained a "black propaganda" radio station in Jerusalem, the "Free Voice of Greece", which pretended to be broadcasting from Greece itself. To maintain this facade, the "Free Voice of Greece" radio station expressed feelings that ordinary Greeks felt and violently attacked the government-in-exile, saying in one broadcast "the Greek Government continues the Metaxas dictatorship in London. It continues as a travesty of Italian and German fascism in London...while they [ie, those fighting on the Albanian front] died, the 4th of August continued in London with Dimitratos, and Nikoloudis the right hand man of Metaxas...Papadakis of the fascist Neolaia [youth movement] and Maniadakis, murderer of A. Michalakopoulos and thousands of others...". This experiment in "black propaganda" turned out to be too "black" for the Foreign Office, as the government-in-exile objected vehemently to the SOE attacking it on the "Free Voice of Greece" radio station, and Sebastian, who was sympathetic towards the republican Venizelists, was replaced with Edward Warner, who was far more sympathetic towards the King.

Throughout the war, Tsouderos and the rest of the government-in-exile strongly pressed Britain for an enosis (union) with Cyprus, arguing that the majority of the Cypriots were ethnic Greeks and wanted to join Greece. After the Battle of Crete, the Foreign Secretary, Anthony Eden, was afraid that the Germans might follow up seizing Crete with Cyprus and would offer the sovereignty over Cyprus to the puppet Hellenic State, and to forestall this wanted to issue a declaration promising an enosis between Greece and Cyprus after the war. However, the Colonial Office was fearful that such a declaration could not be enforced and would only result in increased diplomatic tensions, and as such no declaration was issued. Besides Cyprus, Tsouderos also wanted the Dodecanese islands off the coast of Turkey, whose people were mostly ethnically Greek, which belonged to Italy together with southern Albania and Yugoslav Macedonia.The claim to southern Albania was made on religious, not ethnic grounds as Tsouderos maintained that the majority of people in southern Albania were members of the Orthodox Church, and would therefore be happier living in Orthodox Greece rather than in Muslim majority Albania. Tsouderos's also wanted Greece after the war to annex the Eastern Thrace region of Turkey and for Istanbul to be turned into an international "Free City" with Greece to play a special role in its administration, demands that the Greek historian Procopis Papastratis called "completely unrealistic". Tsouderos's ambitions to annex Yugoslav Macedonia caused much tension with the Yugoslav government-in-exile and in December 1941 the Foreign Office submitted a note to Tsouderos stating "in regard to Macedonia it would be most undesirable that any question of territorial adjustment should be raised at this stage with the Yugoslav government. In regard to the Dodecanese, Southern Albania and Cyprus, they must make it plain that in their view it is premature to raise at this stage questions of future territorial adjustments after the war". When Eden announced in the House of Commons in December 1942 that the British government favored restoring Albanian independence within its pre-war frontiers, Tsouderos objected in a diplomatic note, claiming that southern Albania or "Northern Epirus" as he called it was rightfully part of Greece.

During the war, Tsouderos was opposed to resistance against the Axis occupation of Greece under the grounds that Axis reprisals always killed more people out of all proportion to even the slightest act of resistance, and constantly pressured the Foreign Office to end all British support for the Greek resistance, who however pointed out that support for the resistance was SOE's responsibility. After the SOE launched Operation Animals in June–July 1943 with the Greek resistance ordered to go all out in launching sabotage attacks with the aim of deluding the Germans into thinking that the Allies were going to land in Greece instead of Sicily, Tsouderos submitted a note to Leeper that saying: "

"Today all your expenses for the secret warfare of the guerrillas are in vain and still more are our sacrifices in lives and material used for these secret operations.

The profit you get out of these operations is small when compared to your enormous financial expenses for this type of warfare and to the reprisals taken by the enemy against us, by executions, expulsions, setting fire to villages and towns, rape of women etc. and all else that the enemy practices in revenge for the relatively unimportant acts of sabotage of the guerrillas".

Besides for opposing resistance, Tsouderos felt that Greece had "done enough" in the war, and that with the exception of the Royal Hellenic Navy, Greece should do no more fighting with the Royal Hellenic Army forces in Egypt to be kept in reserve to return to Greece when the war was over. Relations with the SOE were difficult as the SOE refused to share any information with Tsouderos under the grounds that he was a security risk as he lived at the legendary Shepheard's Hotel in Cairo. Most of the Greek resistance groups were republican and the largest and most important resistance group was the Communist-controlled EAM (Ethniko Apeleftherotiko Metopo-National Liberation Front), which was openly hostile towards the monarchy. The most famous act of the Greek resistance, the blowing up of the Gorgopotamos viaduct on the main railroad that linked Athens with Thessaloniki in November 1942 was organised by the SOE with government-in-exile first learning of the sabotage operation by reading the newspapers.

Besides for the SOE, the government-in-exile also had issues with the Foreign Office and the BBC. King George II disliked the reporting done by the BBC's Greek language radio stations, which he felt did not glorify him enough, and repeatedly tried to get the radio announcer G.N. Soteriadis, a well known Venizelist, fired. Relations with the Foreign Office were highly difficult as Warner noted in March 1942 that the King was "under the extraordinary impression that the Foreign Office was 'pro-Republican and anti-himself'". Despite the King's claims that the Foreign Office was conspiring against him, in fact, British diplomats very much favored having the King return to Greece as the best way of keeping Greece in the British sphere of influence. George was a very good personal friend of Churchill, who throughout the war insisted that the King must return to Greece no matter what, and those British officials who questioned this policy were sidelined by the prime minister. The British historian David Brewer summed up the prime minister's views: "Churchill's overall view of the Greek situation had always been of some medieval historical drama in which the King, hedged by something of divinity, defended his throne but was surrounded by scheming courtier-politicians while a despicable rabble clamored at the gates".

The support offered by the King to the dictatorial 4 August Regime, Greece's defeat in April–May 1941, and the fact that many 4 August Regime officials went on to collaborate with the Germans by serving in the puppet Hellenic State caused a massive upsurge in support for republicanism in Greece, and SOE officers serving in Greece consistently reported that the Greek people did not want the King to return. Owing to the difficulties imposed by the Axis occupation, the state of Greek public opinion can only be gauged by impressionistic evidence, but the preponderance of the evidence indicates that the majority of the Greek people did not regard King George as their legitimate monarch and preferred that he abdicate so that the republic could be restored. Lincoln MacVeagh, the American ambassador to Greece, reported in July 1941 that "fiery Venizelists, like Mr George Melas, Mr Papandreou and General Mazarakis, have urged me to realize that the King can never come back, no matter what happens, and have begged me to tell my government not to let the British attempt to impose him on an unwilling country".

In November 1943, a SOE officer, Major Donald Stott, arrived in Greece and contacted the leaders of all Greek resistance groups except for EAM. As most of these groups were republican, Stott pressed very strongly to have them declare their loyalty to George II. Stott also informed his contacts that once Greece was liberated he expected a civil war to break out between communist and anti-communist groups, and his government would support the latter. He then proceeded to Athens, meeting with senior German officials and requesting they arrange for the Security Battalions to switch sides and serve the Greek government-in-exile when it returned to Greece in order to prevent EAM from coming to power.

Stott was in radio contact with the SOE headquarters in Cairo during his visit to Athens, reporting to a Brigadier Keble. After Stott's meeting was uncovered, he was denounced as a rogue agent and reprimanded while Keble was fired. Stott's visit inflamed EAM's suspicions towards the Cairo government, as many EAM members believed the King would pardon the Security Battalions and enlist them to fight on his behalf. Mazower reported that many of the documents relating to the Stott mission at the Public Record Office are still closed to historians, and argued on the basis of one declassified document which stated that "our long term policy towards Greece is to retain her in the British sphere of influence, and... a Russian-dominated Greece would not be in accordance with British in the Eastern Mediterranean" that Britain encouraged the government-in-exile to ally with anti-communist groups in Greece.

In March 1944, EAM proclaimed a Political Committee of National Liberation to rule those areas of Greece under its control, which was very close to proclaiming a provisional government, and was seen by the government-in-exile as a challenge to its legitimacy. In April 1944, pro-EAM mutinies broke out in the Greek forces in Egypt as many of the ordinary Greek soldiers and sailors made it clear that they supported EAM rather than the government. In Alexandria, the crews of all the Royal Hellenic Navy's warships stationed in the harbour mutinied and threw their officers overboard, forcing the officers to swim to the shore. The government, unable to maintain its authority over its own armed forces, had to ask the British to put down the mutinies. As much as possible, the British tried to have the mutinies suppressed by Greek forces rather than their own military police. In response to the mutiny, Tsunderos resigned as prime minister on 13 April 1944, to be replaced by the "ineffectual" Sofoklis Venizelos. On 23 April 1944, in the climax of the mutiny, a group of loyalist Greek sailors and junior naval officers stormed the Greek Navy's warships in Alexandria harbor controlled by the mutineers and in the process 50 men were killed or wounded. Venizelos resigned as prime minister in favor of Georgios Papandreou on 26 April 1944. After the mutiny, of the 18, 500 Greek soldiers in Egypt, 2, 500 who had not joined the mutiny were formed into the Third Mountain Brigade, which was sent to fight in Italy while 8, 000 soldiers were interned in Egypt for the rest of the war and another 2,000 soldiers were allowed to continue their military service, but were not allowed access to weapons.

The first action of the new Papandreou government was to call a conference at the Grand Hotel du Bois de Boulogne in Beirut of all the leading Greek politicians together with representatives of the resistance groups including EAM, which concluded that after the war a referendum would be held on the question of the King's return, all of the andartes (guerrillas) were to accept authority of the government-in-exile, and the resistance groups were to enter the cabinet. The Communist leadership in Greece refused to accept the Lebanon Charter and demanded an officer of ELAS (Ellinikós Laïkós Apeleftherotikós Stratós-Greek People's Liberation Army), the military arm of EAM, should command the armed forces and that Papandreaou give EAM the ministries of the interior, justice and labour. Papandreaou rejected these demands, but he promised to resign for the sake of national unity, only to be overruled by Churchill who declared: "We cannot take up a man as we have done Papandreaou and let him be thrown to the wolves at the first snarling of the miserable Greek banditti".

The Greek government returned from exile accompanied by a group of British forces in October 1944.

== Government ==
=== Monarch ===
Portrait	Name (Born-Died)	Reign	
Portrait	Name (Born-Died)	Start	End
	King George II (1890–1947)	3 November 1935	1 April 1947

=== Prime Ministers ===
Portrait	Name (Born-Died)	Term of office		Party	Cabinet
Portrait	Name (Born-Died)	Start	End	Party	Cabinet
1	Emmanouil Tsouderos (1882–1956)	29 April 1941	13 April 1944	Independent	Tsouderos
2	Sofoklis Venizelos (1894–1964)	13 April 1944	26 April 1944	Liberal Party	Venizelos
3	Georgios Papandreou (1888–1968)	26 April 1944	18 October 1944	Democratic Socialist Party	Papandreou

== Armed forces ==
=== Greek army officers participated in S.O.E. ===
Greek army officers participated in the mission of S.O.E. in Greece, under command of the Greek government.

== Sources ==
- Brewer, David (2016). Greece The Decade of War, Occupation, Resistance, and Civil War. I.B. Tauris. ISBN 978-1780768540.
- Eudes, Dominique (1973). The Kapetanios. NYU Press. ISBN 085345275X.
- Clogg, Richard (July 1979). "The Greek Government-in-Exile 1941-4". The International History Review. 1 (3). Cambridge University Press: 376–398. doi:10.1080/07075332.1979.9640190.
- Mazower, Mark (1993). Inside Hitler's Greece: The Experience of Occupation, 1941-44. Yale University Press. ISBN 0300089236.
- Papastratis, Procopis (1984). British Policy Towards Greece During the Second World War 1941–1944. Cambridge University Press. ISBN 9780521243421.
