= Michail Komninos Afentoulief =

Greek Imperial Russian Army officer

Michail Komneinos Afentoulief or Afentoulis (Greek: Μιχαήλ Κομνηνός Αφεντούλιεφ/Αφεντούλης) was a Greek who lived in Russia and served as an officer in the Imperial Russian Army. He is best known for his participation in the Greek Revolution and his activities on the island of Crete during the period 1822–23.

== Biography ==
Michail Komninos was born in Nizhny Novgorod in 1769. He attended the Military School of St. Petersburg and reached the rank of Major in the Russian army.

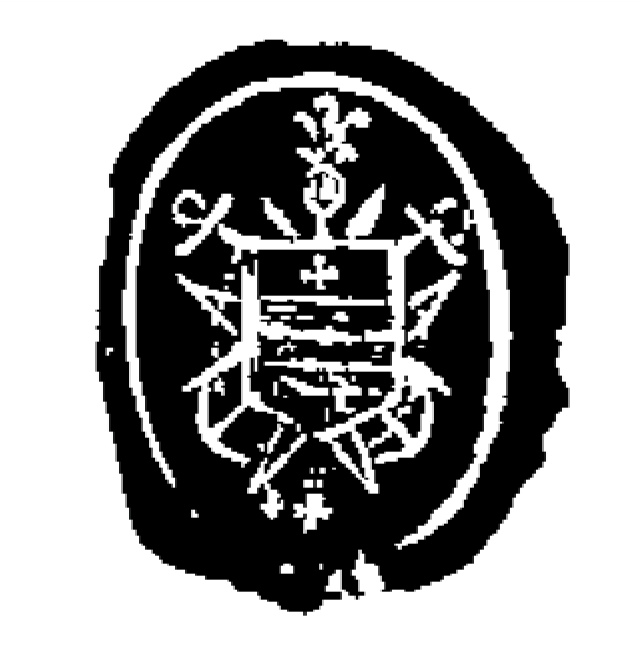
Afentoulief's seal

Following the outbreak of the Greek War of Independence in 1821, he came to Greece, following Alexandros Kantakouzinos. In the summer of 1821, along with Kantakouzinos, he went to Monemvasia upon the orders of Dimitrios Ypsilantis. There, Cretan rebels proposed to Kantakouzinos to take up the leadership of the revolution in Crete. After his refusal, Ypsilantis appointed Afentoulief instead. He arrived at Sfakia on 25 October 1821 (according to Spyridon Trikoupis) or in the beginning of November (according to Kritoulidis, Filimonas and Orlandos) on board the ship of Ioannis Vlachos, a citizen of the Ionian Islands, accompanied by Cretan soldiers. He also brought a small amount of food and ammunition to the island.

His first act was the convening of a general assembly of the local military and political leadership. The nickname of "Afentoulis" was given to him by the Cretans.

== Assessment and criticism ==
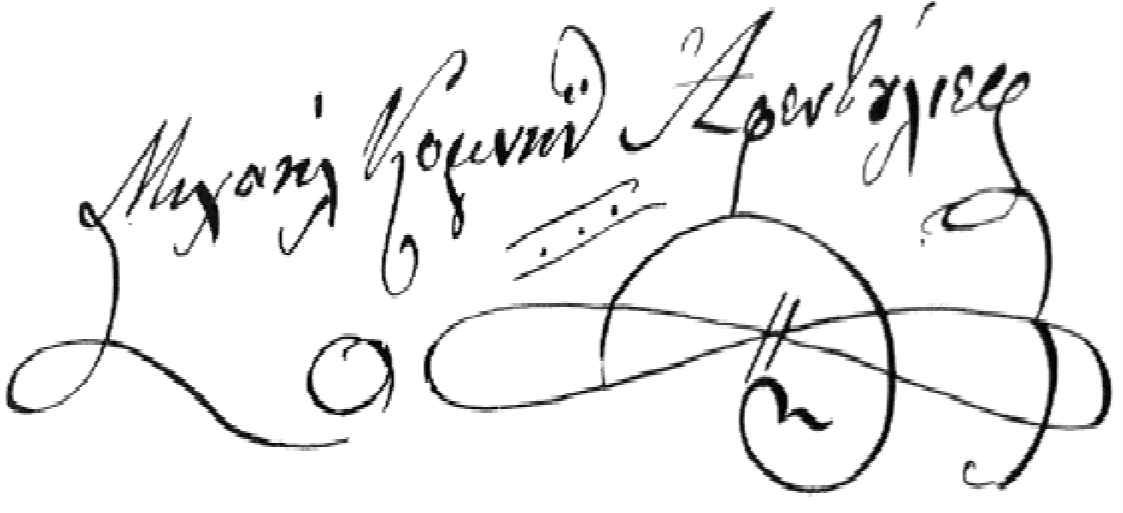
The signature of Afentoulief

Historians differ in their assessment of Afentoulief's tenure in Crete. Some hold that he was a capable and earnest soldier and administrator, but unable to adapt himself to the circumstances of Crete. Others hold that his demeanour was characterized by conceit, imperiousness and ineffectiveness and that he ignored completely the mentality of the Cretans. It is also alleged that he neglected to expand the revolt across Crete, instead focusing on trading from Sfakia. His administrative establishments failed due to lack of knowledge of the island, while his award of ranks to the military leaders led to personal rivalries and enmities. Very soon, he began to be viewed with mistrust by the local war leaders.

Dissatisfaction with him increased after his failure in winning the battles of May 1822. A few months later, realizing how critical the situation was, he resigned, proposing to be sent back to the Peloponnese to ask for help. The Cretan administrative council accepted his resignation.

== After Crete ==
In February 1823, Afentoulief left Crete and was succeeded by Neofytos Oikonomou as governor of Crete. At the end of his life he stayed at Florence. He died on 9/21 June 1855 at the age of 86 and was buried in the cemetery of the Greek community in Livorno.

== Sources ==
- Christopoulos, Georgios A. & Bastias, Ioannis K., eds. (1975). Ιστορία του Ελληνικού Έθνους [History of the Greek Nation] (in Greek). Vol. ΙΒ: Η Ελληνική Επανάσταση (1821 - 1832) [The Greek Revolution (1821 - 1832)]. Athens: Ekdotiki Athinon. ISBN 978-960-213-108-4.
- Σοφία Μπελόκα. "Μιχαήλ Κομνηνός Αφεντούλιεφ ή Αφεντούλης" (PDF). Πάντειο Πανεπιστήμιο, Τμήμα Πολιτικής Επιστήμης και Ιστορίας. Archived from the original (PDF) on February 21, 2014.
