= Emmanouil Tsouderos =

Greek politician

- Εμμανουήλ Τσουδερός
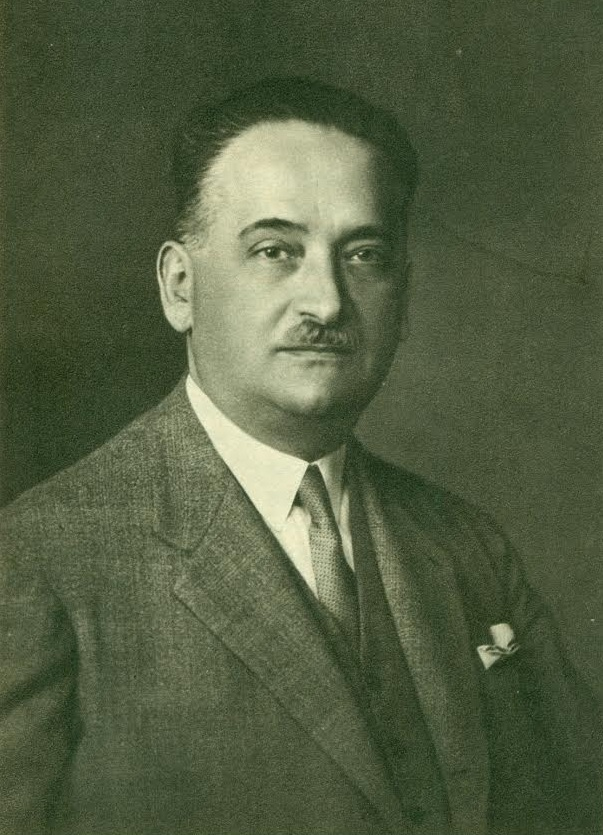

Prime Minister of Greece (in exile)
- In office 21 April 1941 – 13 April 1944
- Monarch: George II
- Preceded by: Alexandros Koryzis
- Succeeded by: Sofoklis Venizelos

Personal details
- Born: 19 July 1882 Rethymno, Crete, Ottoman Empire
- Died: 10 February 1956 (aged 73) Nervi, Republic of Italy
- Party: Democratic Progressive Party
- Children: Ioannis Tsouderos, Athena Tsouderou, Virginia Tsouderou
- Occupation: Lawyer, economist

Emmanouil Tsouderos (Greek: Εμμανουήλ Τσουδερός, also transliterated as Emmanuel Tsouderos; 19 July 1882 – 10 February 1956) was a Greek politician and statesman who served as the internationally recognized Prime Minister of Greece from 1941 to 1944 as head of the Greek government-in-exile during the Second World War. He resigned in 1944, following a mutiny in the exiled armed forces.

== Early life and studies ==
Emmanuel Tsouderos was born in 1882 in Rethymno, Crete (then part of the Ottoman Empire). He studied law at Athens University, and economics in Paris and London.

== Career in politics ==
He returned to Crete aged 24, and was elected Member of Parliament of the Cretan Legislature (1906–1912), when Crete had autonomous status under the suzerainty of the Ottoman Empire and was under the protection of Russia, Britain, France and Italy.

After the union of Crete with Greece in December 1913, he was elected to the Hellenic Parliament, and served as Minister of Transportation under Eleftherios Venizelos, and Minister of Finances under Themistoklis Sophoulis.

In 1928, when the Central Bank of Greece was established, Tsouderos was appointed its first vice-Governor, and in 1931 its Governor.

== Prime minister ==
Following the suicide of Prime Minister Alexandros Koryzis on 18 April 1941, amidst the German invasion of Greece, King George II of Greece sought for his successor. Several names, such as Konstantinos Kotzias, the former dictator General Theodoros Pangalos, and the Venizelist general Alexandros Mazarakis-Ainian were discussed, but either rejected or turned down the offer. As the evacuation of the Greek government to Crete was being prepared, Tsouderos, as a Venizelist and Cretan, as well as a known Anglophile, emerged as a prominent choice for the post during the 20th. On the next day, after attending a séance in which the spirit of Venizelos urged him to accept, Tsouderos accepted and was sworn in as Prime Minister. On the 20th, the Greek army in Epirus unilaterally surrendered to the Germans, and on the morning of the 23rd, the Greek government left Athens.

Tsouderos fled again during the Battle of Crete. He went to the Middle East and later Egypt. Tsouderos headed the Greek government in exile from 29 April 1941 until 13 April 1944. Although he was the internationally recognized as the Prime Minister of Greece (in opposition to the numerous prime ministers who were the figureheads of the collaborationist Hellenic State), in practice he had little influence inside Greece's borders. This government was initially located in London, but subsequently moved to Cairo. In Spring of 1944, the Greek Army and Navy mutinied. Among their demands was resignation of the King and Tsouderos. He served in the subsequent government in exile under Sofoklis Venizelos.

== Post-War Greece ==
Following the Greek Civil War, Tsouderos would go on to lead the Democratic Progressive Party (Dimokratikon Proodefitikon Komma). During the 1950 Election, Tsouderos formed a coalition government with Nikolaos Plastiras' Progressive Liberal Center Party (Komma Proodefitkon Fileleftheron Kentrou), to form the National Progressive Center Union (Ethniki Proodetiki Enosis Kentrou)

After the end of World War II Tsouderos served in different capacities, until his death at the age of 73 in Nervi, Genoa, Italy on 10 February 1956.

== Personal life ==
He was married and had three children:

- Ioannis Tsouderos (1923–1997) – Greek Politician in the 1960s and 1970s
- Athena Tsouderou (1921-2009) - Served as President of the World YWCA
- Virginia Tsouderou (1924–2018) – Served as Deputy Foreign Minister of Greece (Aug. 1991 – Oct. 1993)

== Awards ==
- Order of George I, 1941

== Sources ==
- Koliopoulos, Ioannis S. (1976–1977). "Η στρατιωτική και πολιτική κρίση στην Ελλάδα τον Απρίλιο του 1941" [The Military and Political Crisis in Greece in April 1941] (PDF). Μνήμων (in Greek). 6: 53–74. doi:10.12681/mnimon.174.
- See Marguarita Dritsas, Hellenic Open University, for her definitive biography of Tsourderos, based on his personal papers in the Bank of Greece Archives. [Dritsas, Margarita. (2012). Emmanuel Tsouderos, 1882–1956, Central Banker and Politician. Bank of Greece Publications.]
