= 1944 Greek naval mutiny =

Mutiny on five ships of the Greek Navy

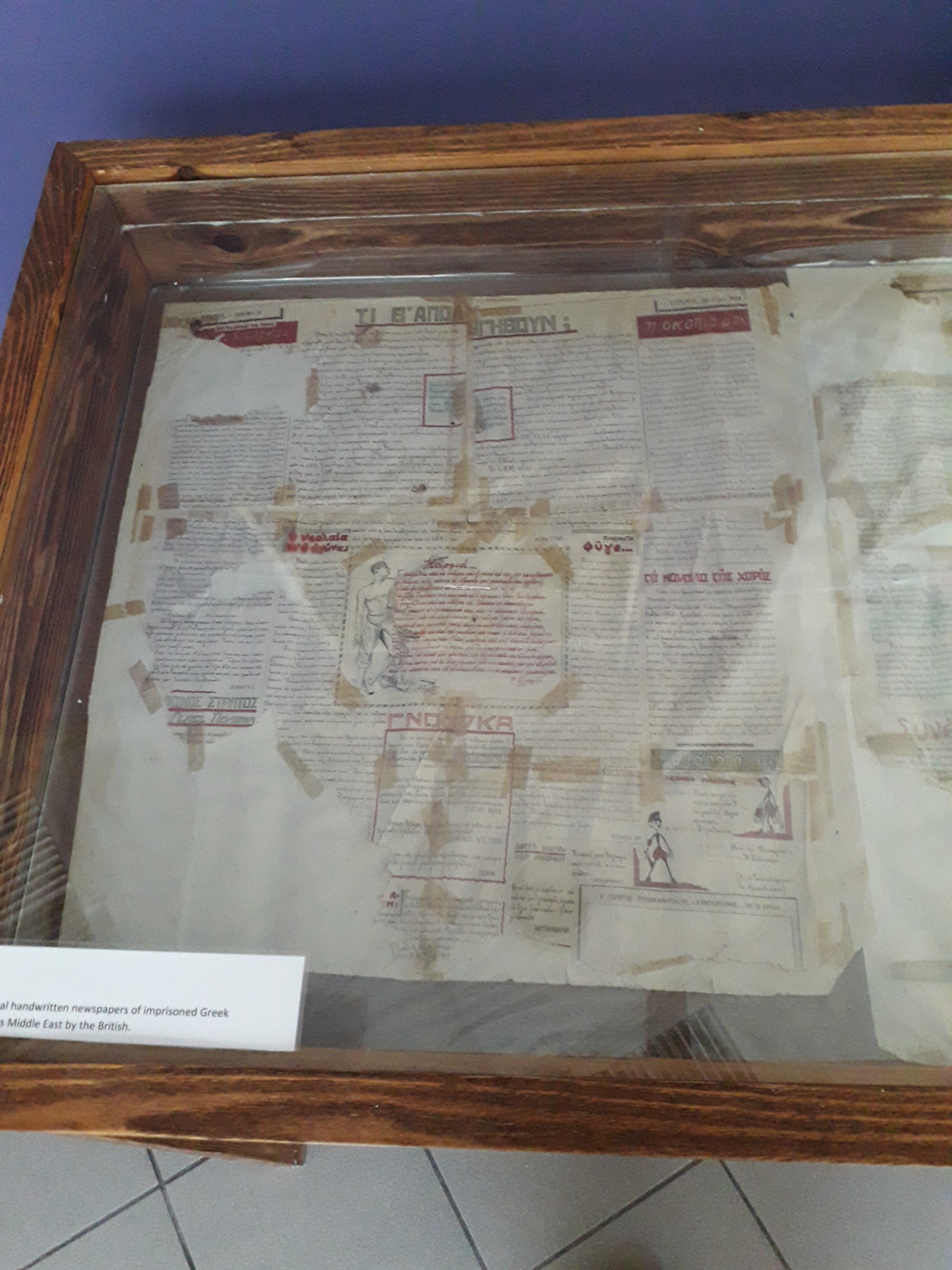
Newspaper created by imprisoned pro-EAM mutineers

The 1944 Greek naval mutiny was a mutiny by sailors on five ships of the Royal Hellenic Navy in April 1944 over the composition of the Greek government-in-exile, in support of the National Liberation Front (EAM). Petros Voulgaris was called from retirement and appointed vice-admiral to quell the revolt.

The revolt began in Alexandria. Sailors Revolutionary Commissions were formed both on ships and the naval shore establishments on 4 April 1944.

The 1st Brigade of the Greek Armed Forces in the Middle East also suffered a EAM-inspired mutiny on 6 April 1944.

The American philosopher James Burnham, writing in the Partisan Review, saw the mutiny as the start of a "Third World War" as the start of a geopolitical confrontation between the Western Allies and Soviet communism.

== Ships involved ==
- Greek corvette Apostolis
- Greek corvette Sachtouris
- Greek destroyer Kriti
- Greek destroyer Ierax
- Greek destroyer Pindos
