= October 1923 =

Month of 1923

<<	October 1923					>>
Su	Mo	Tu	We	Th	Fr	Sa
	1	2	3	4	5	6
7	8	9	10	11	12	13
14	15	16	17	18	19	20
21	22	23	24	25	26	27
28	29	30	31

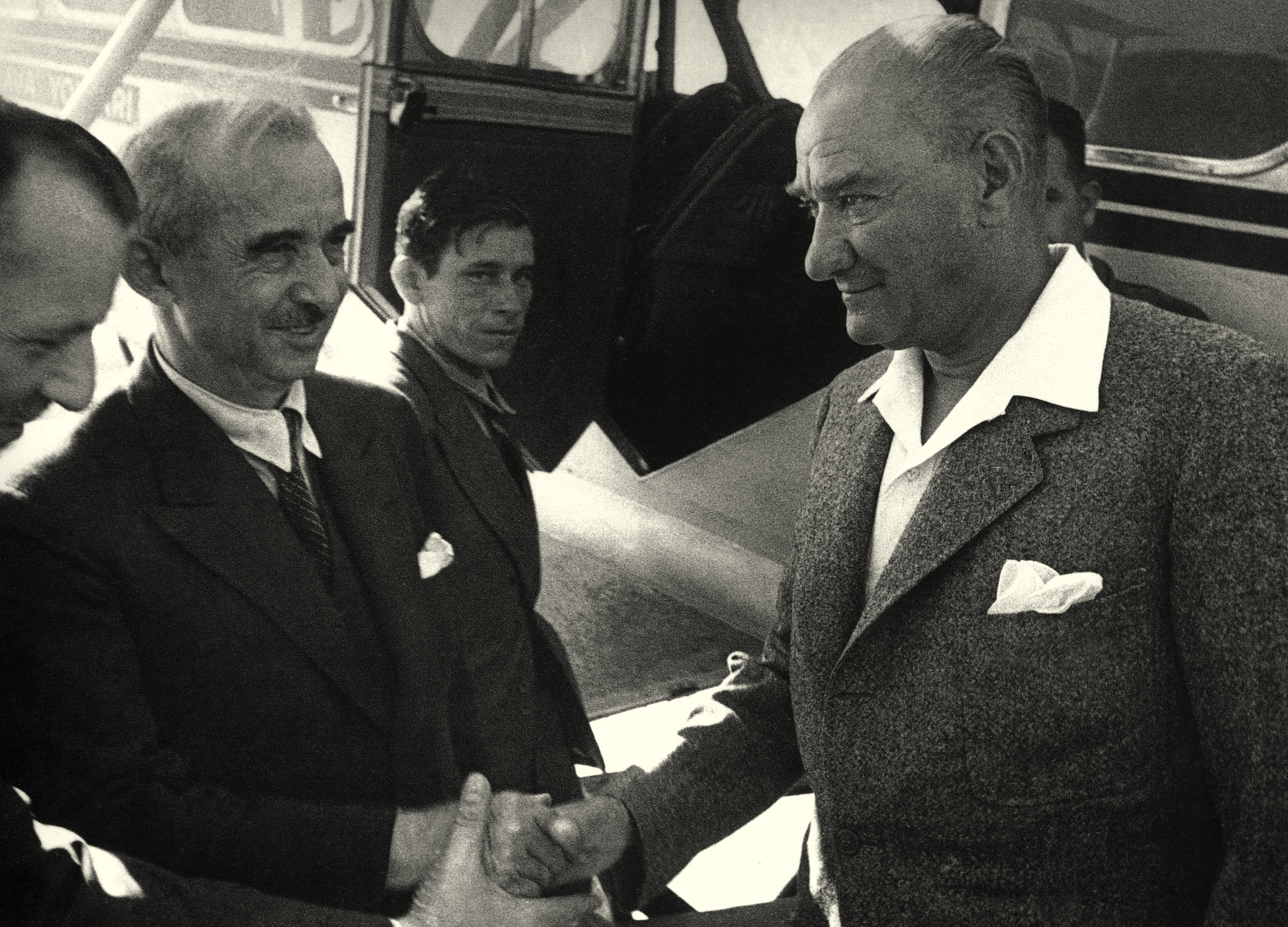
October 30, 1923: Ismet İnönü and Kemal Atatürk become prime minister and president of the new Republic of Turkey

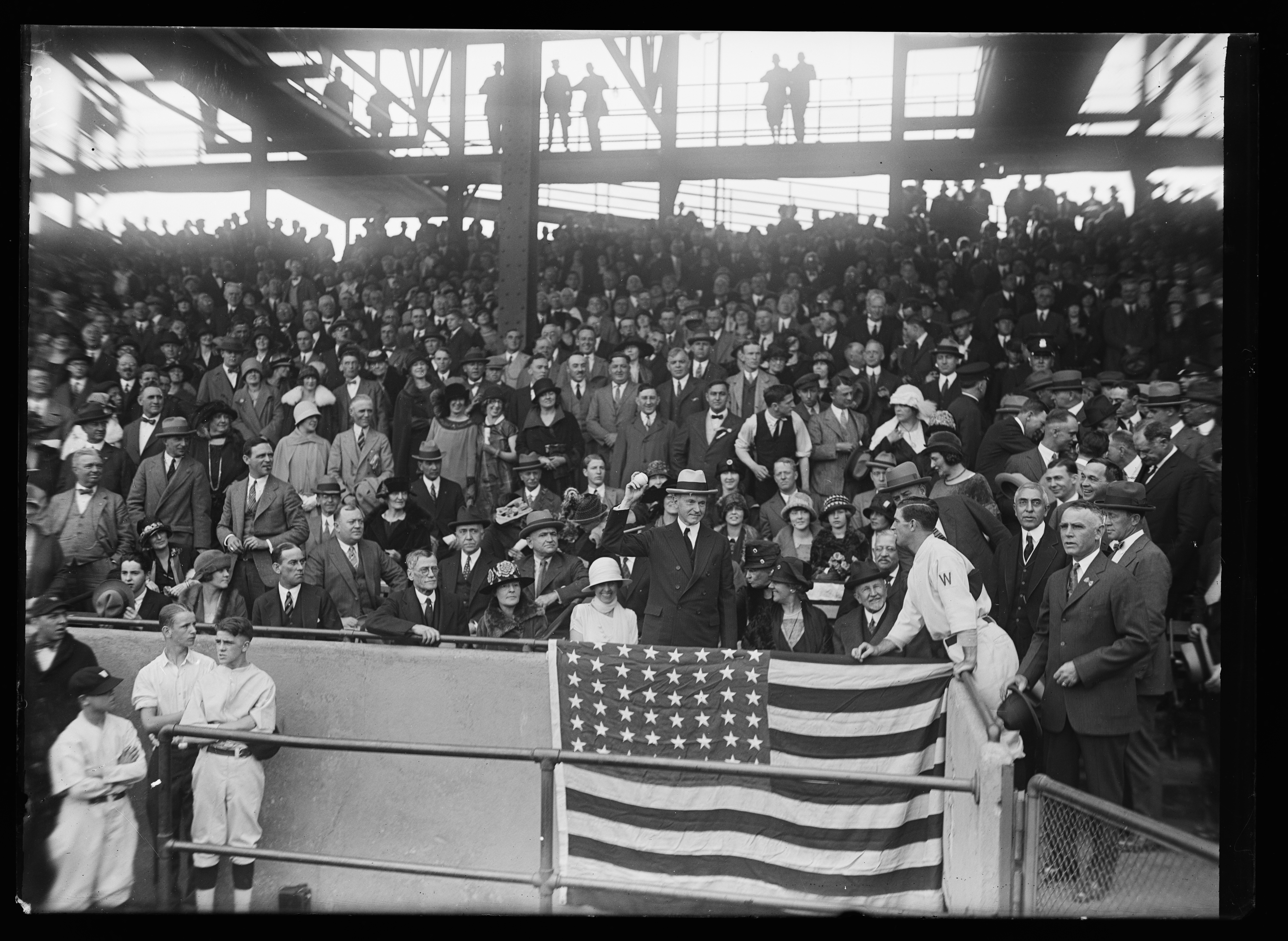
October 10, 1923: U.S. President Coolidge throws out the first ball for the New York vs. New York World Series

The following events occurred in October 1923:

== October 1, 1923 (Monday) ==
- Southern Rhodesia (now Zimbabwe) was granted responsible government status as a colony within the British Empire, after a 1922 referendum in which white voters favored self-government rather than being united with South Africa.
- The 1923 Imperial Conference opened in London.
- Switzerland issued a new decree banning the display of fascist emblems or the wearing of black shirts. The decree was a response to agitation in Lugano by fascists who wanted the region to join Italy.
- Georges Carpentier knocked out former British heavyweight champion Joe Beckett a mere twenty seconds into the first round of their boxing match at Olympia in London. Beckett would never box again.
- Born: Bui Diem, South Vietnamese Ambassador to the U.S. during the Vietnam War, founder of the Saigon Post, later a professor at George Mason University in the U.S.; in Hà Nam province, Tonkin (present-day Vietnam) (d. 2021)

== October 2, 1923 (Tuesday) ==
- The foreign occupation of the Turkish city of Istanbul, formerly Constantinople, ended with the departure of the remaining troops from the UK, France and Italy.
- The Küstrin Putsch, an attempt by Bruno Ernst Buchrucker of the right-wing Black Reichswehr paramilitary group to overthrow the Weimar Republic government of Germany and Chancellor Gustav Stresemann, was put down by government troops.
- A referendum was held in Oklahoma in which voters approved an amendment permitting the state legislature to convene itself.
- Died: John Wilson Bengough, 72, Canadian political cartoonist and editor of the satire magazine Grip (b. 1851)

== October 3, 1923 (Wednesday) ==
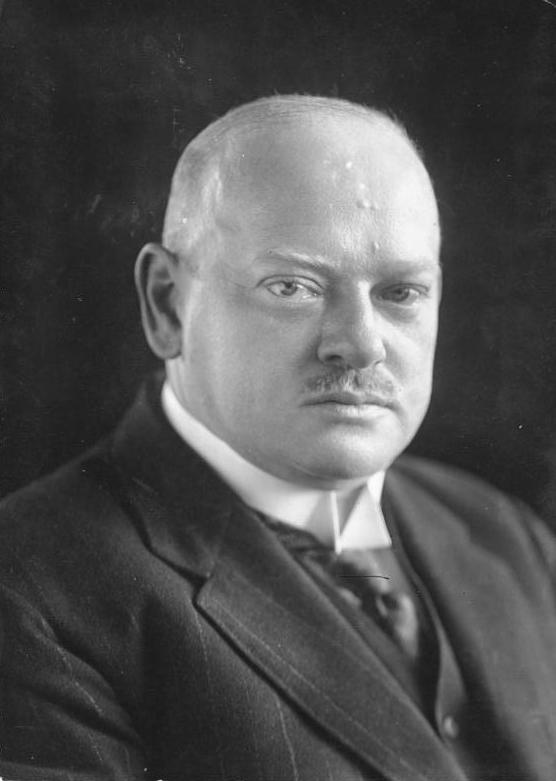
Chancellor Stresemann

- The entire cabinet of German chancellor Gustav Stresemann resigned after several members of the Social Democrats joined with the Communists in their call for the lifting of martial law. President Friedrich Ebert accepted the resignations but asked Stresemann to form another government.
- Three convicted murderers in Kentucky State Penitentiary who had obtained guns killed three guards as they attempted to shoot their way out of the prison. They failed to escape, but barricaded themselves in the mess hall and a standoff began.
- Born: Edward Oliver LeBlanc, Dominican politician, served as Chief Minister of Dominica from 1961 to 1967, and Premier of Dominica from 1967 to 1974; in Vieille Case, Dominica (d. 2004)
- Died:
  - Dr. Kadambini Ganguly, 62, the first female Indian doctor to practice western medicine (b. 1861)
  - M. Kantharaj Urs, 53, Indian statesman and prime minister (Diwan) to the Maharaja of the princely state of Mysore under British rule from 1918 to 1922 (b. 1870)

== October 4, 1923 (Thursday) ==
- The French evening newspaper Paris-soir ("Paris Evening News"), which would become the best-selling newspaper in Europe prior to World War II and was founded by Jean Prouvost, published its first issue.
- Five men were rescued from a flooded mine at Redding, Falkirk, Scotland, after being trapped for ten days.
- In Columbus, Georgia, boxer Young Stribling (William Stribling Jr.) thought he was the new light-heavyweight boxing champion of the world after defeating Mike McTigue, but referee Harry Ertle released a written statement after leaving the arena saying the match was actually a draw. Ertle claimed that he felt threatened by promoters and the crowd of 8,000 fans, and feared that he would not leave the arena alive if he did not award the bout to the local fighter Stribling.
- Nathan M. Ohrbach and Max Wiesen launched Ohrbach's Department Store, starting with its store in New York City, and building a chain that would exist until 1987.
- The drama film Slave of Desire starring George Walsh and Bessie Love was released.
- Born:
  - Charlton Heston, American actor, Academy Award winner for his role in Ben-Hur; as John Charles Carter, in Evanston, Illinois, United States (d. 2008)
  - Charles Lazarus, American toy industry executive who founded the Toys "R" Us chain of toy stores in 1957; in Washington, D.C., United States (d. 2018)
- Died:
  - Enrico Massi, 25, Italian-born aviator who pioneered aviation in El Salvador; killed in a plane crash (b. 1897)
  - Estanislao Zeballos, 69, Argentine lawyer and politician, served as Foreign Minister of Argentina three times between 1889 and 1908, and as Speaker of the House of Representatives (b. 1854)

== October 5, 1923 (Friday) ==
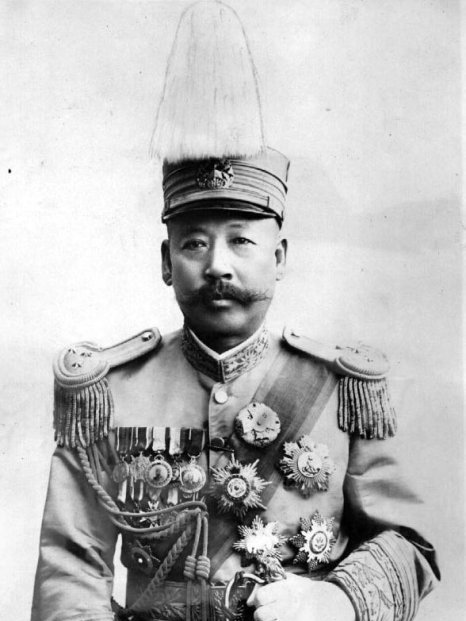
Cao Kun

- Cao Kun was elected president of the Republic of China by China's parliament, receiving 480 of the 590 votes cast, ahead of five other candidates. Former president Sun Yat-sen was second with 33 votes. Cao, a warlord of the Zhili clique, was later revealed to have paid bribes of 5,000 yuan apiece to members of parliament who had served him during the Zhili–Anhui War.
- Manuel Teixeira Gomes took office as the seventh president of Portugal.
- Former British prime minister David Lloyd George arrived in New York City on the ship RMS Mauretania to begin an unofficial visit to the United States and Canada. Crowds greeted him enthusiastically except for a few groups of Irish protesters, some of whom threw eggs at him.
- The National Guard targeted the barricaded convicts at the Kentucky State Penitentiary with gas-filled grenades fired through the windows.
- Born:
  - Glynis Johns, South African-born British actress, Tony Award winner for 1973's A Little Night Music; in Pretoria, Union of South Africa (present-day South Africa) (d. 2024)
  - Albert Guðmundsson, Icelandic professional football player, later a presidential candidate and Minister of Industry of Iceland; in Reykjavík, Iceland (d. 1994)
  - Ricardo Lavié, Argentine actor; as Ricardo Eloy Machado, in Buenos Aires, Argentina (d. 2010)

== October 6, 1923 (Saturday) ==
- The Third Corps of the Turkish Land Forces, led by General Şükrü Naili Gökberk, entered Istanbul on behalf of the Turkish government in Ankara and reclaimed the former Constantinople after the end of almost five years of foreign occupation. The anniversary of Gökberk's entry is now celebrated annually in Turkey as "Istanbul Liberation Day" (Istanbul'un Kurtuluşu).
- Chancellor Gustav Stresemann presented his new cabinet, which was exactly the same as the previous one except for Hans Luther as the new Minister of Finance.
- Authorities stormed the barricade in the Kentucky State Penitentiary and found the three convicts had been dead for about two days, at least two of which due to suicide by gunshot.
- The Australian state of Queensland held a referendum on prohibition; 59.3% of the voters favored maintaining the current system regarding alcohol sales and rejected any additional prohibition.
- Czech Airlines was founded by the government of Czechoslovakia as Československé státní aerolinie (ČSA). It would operate its first flight on October 29.
- Harlakenden in Cornish, New Hampshire, used as the "Summer White House" for three years by U.S. president Woodrow Wilson from 1913 to 1915, was destroyed by a fire.
- Shortstop Ernie Padgett of the Boston Braves turned an unassisted triple play against the Philadelphia Phillies, only the fourth in Major League Baseball history.
- The Niagara College football team played one of the more unusual games in the history of American college sports when it protested the refusal of Colgate University to allow quarters of 8 minutes in length rather than the standard 15 minutes. Niagara Coach Pete Dwyer told his players not to tackle the Colgate players, and Colgate scored three touchdowns and took a 21–0 lead in the first two minutes of the game, before agreeing to Niagara's conditions. In the remaining 30 minutes of game time, Colgate scored 34 more points in a 55–0 win.
- Iowa State College star Jack Trice, one of the few African-American players on a white college football team, was fatally injured in the Cyclones' 20–17 loss at the University of Minnesota.
- The University of Southern California (USC) Trojans played their first game in the new Los Angeles Memorial Coliseum. Less than 13,000 people came to the 75,000-seat venue for USC's 23 to 7 win over Pomona College.
- Born:
  - Robert Kuok, Malaysian business magnate and investor, the wealthiest Malaysian citizen with a net worth of $12.6 billion as of 2023; as Kuok Hok Nien, in Johor Bahru, Johor Sultanate, British Malaya (present-day Malaysia)
  - Yaşar Kemal, Turkish author and human rights activist; as Kemal Sadık Gökçeli, in Hemite, Turkey (present-day Gökçedam) (d. 2015)
- Died:
  - Damat Ferid Pasha, 69–70, Ottoman statesman, served as the Grand Vizier of the Ottoman Empire; died of duodenal cancer while in exile in France on the same day as the Liberation of Istanbul (b. 1853)
  - Kurt Rackow, 30, German Army officer who led the capture of Fort Vaux in the Battle of Verdun in World War I (b. 1893)

== October 7, 1923 (Sunday) ==
- The first section of the Appalachian Trail, a hiking trail in the eastern United States, was opened with a 16 miles (26 km) path from Bear Mountain in the state of New York, to the Delaware Water Gap on the border of New Jersey and Pennsylvania. With an objective of having a hiking path from Maine to Georgia, the Trail would be 2,194 miles (3,531 km) long by 2023.
- Police in Tokyo broke up a mob marching on insurance offices to demand a promise to pay insurance for damages from the earthquake.
- Former UK prime minister David Lloyd George visited Westmount, Quebec for the groundbreaking ceremony of a new Baptist church. In a speech, he warned against a "wave of materialism sweeping over the world. Europe is in the grip of a grim struggle between hope and despair, and in that struggle it is becoming material."
- Born: Irma Grese, German concentration camp guard; in Wrechen, Free State of Mecklenburg-Strelitz, Germany (d. 1945, executed by hanging)

== October 8, 1923 (Monday) ==
- William Shakespeare's least popular play, Titus Andronicus, was given its first performance in more than 300 years on a British stage, as part of a project by the Royal Victoria Hall theater to stage all of the Bard's works. Robert A. Atkins was the director, Wilfred Walter played the title role, and the "new" Shakespearean play was a box office success.
- Ion Moța, Corneliu Zelea Codreanu, and several other Fascists in Romania were arrested for conspiracy to assassinate prominent Romanian Jews and Romanian politicians, after being turned in by another member of the group, Aurelian Vernichescu. Mota shot and killed Vernischescu at the trial, but he and Codreanu would be acquitted of the conspiracy charges on March 29. The two men would go on to form Romania's Iron Guard paramilitary group.
- The musical comedy play Battling Buttler, starring Charlie Ruggles, opened on Broadway. In 1926 it was adapted into a film of the same name starring Buster Keaton.
- The Western comedy-drama film The Bad Man starring Holbrook Blinn was released.
- Born:
  - Avraham Shifrin, Soviet dissident and human rights activist who spent 10 years in prison on false charges of espionage from 1953 to 1963; in Minsk, Byelorussian SSR, Soviet Union (present-day Belarus) (d. 1998)
  - Vella Pillay, South African-born British economist and anti-apartheid crusader; in Johannesburg, Union of South Africa (present-day South Africa) (d. 2004)

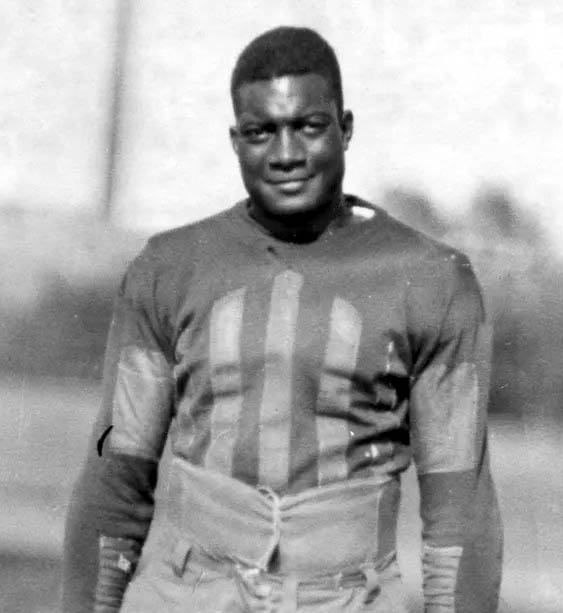
Jack Trice

- Died:
  - Jack Trice, 21, American college football player at Iowa State College; died of injuries sustained two days earlier when he was trampled by opposing players in a game against the University of Minnesota (b. 1902). Trice may have been targeted by his opponents during the game due to being African American.
  - Florence Montgomery, 80, English novelist and children's writer; died of breast cancer (b. 1843)
  - Beatrice deMille, 70, English-born American playwright and entrepreneur, co-founder of Paramount Pictures (b. 1853)

== October 9, 1923 (Tuesday) ==
- Bavarian State Commissioner Gustav von Kahr instituted the death penalty for food profiteering.
- During a dinner speech in Ottawa, David Lloyd George endorsed a proposal by U.S. Secretary of State Charles Evans Hughes for an international commission to determine Germany's capability to pay its reparations.

== October 10, 1923 (Wednesday) ==
- Cao Kun (referred to in the press at the time as Tsao Kun) was officially inaugurated as the new president of the Republic of China (which at the time comprised the northern provinces), four months after he had overthrown President Li Yuanhong. Prime Minister Gao Lingwei had been installed as interim president by Cao Kun until an election could take place.
- The U.S. Navy airship Shenandoah was christened at a ceremony in Lakehurst, New Jersey by Marion Thurber Denby, wife of the Secretary of the Navy, Edwin Denby. Mr. and Mrs. Denby, their son, and 12 of their guests then made a flight on the airship.
- The first World Series game ever held at Yankee Stadium was played between the New York Yankees and the crosstown Giants. The Giants won Game 1 by a 5–4 score in exciting fashion; with the game tied at 4 with two out in the top of the ninth inning, Casey Stengel got a full count and then hit an inside-the-park home run.
- Saxon Prime Minister Erich Zeigner accepted the entry of Communists into his cabinet, believing they were necessary to fight the threat of nationalists from the neighboring state of Bavaria.
- Born:
  - James "Jabby" Jabara, American ace fighter pilot; in Muskogee, Oklahoma, United States (d. 1966)
  - Giacinto Auriti, Italian economist and bank reformer; in Guardiagrele, Kingdom of Italy (present-day Italy) (d. 2006)
  - Murray Walker, English motorsport commentator; as Graeme Murray Walker, in Hall Green, Birmingham, England (d. 2021)
  - Louis Gottlieb, American singer and bass player (d. 1996)
  - Nicholas Parsons, English actor and game show host; as Christopher Nicholas Parsons, in Grantham, England (d. 2020)
- Died:
  - Andrés Avelino Cáceres, 86, Peruvian politician and general, served as the President of Peru from 1886 to 1890 and 1894 to 1895 (b. 1836)
  - Lev Tikhomirov, 71, Russian conservative revolutionary (b. 1852)
  - Dora Rappard, 81, Swiss Anglican evangelist and writer of hymns (b. 1842)
  - Susan Newell, 29–30, Scottish murderer; hanged at Duke Street Prison in Glasgow, becoming the last woman to be legally executed in Scotland (b. 1893)

== October 11, 1923 (Thursday) ==
- The DeAutremont Brothers criminal gang attempted to rob Southern Pacific Railroad Train No. 13 as it passed through a tunnel in the Siskiyou Mountains. The engineer was ordered at gunpoint to stop the train, but the mail clerk saw what was happening and locked himself inside the mail car. A dynamite charge was used to blow open the car, but the explosion caused so much vision-obscuring smoke and dust that the brothers panicked and fled empty-handed after shooting four people to avoid witnesses to the crime.
- All 30 people on the freighter SS City of Everett died when the ship foundered in the Gulf of Mexico while carrying molasses from Santiago de Cuba to New Orleans.
- Eight children riding a horse-drawn school bus were killed near Rootstown, Ohio when the vehicle was struck by a Pennsylvania Railroad express train. The driver and two other children were seriously injured, while another five children were able to escape uninjured before the impact.

== October 12, 1923 (Friday) ==
- Diego Manuel Chamorro, President of Nicaragua since 1921, died suddenly. Since Vice President Bartolomé Martínez could not be located, Interior Minister Rosendo Chamorro was designated as acting president until Martínez could come to Managua.
- The British government of India declared the Sikh nationalist organizations Akali Dal and the Shiromani Gurdwara Parbandhak Committee (SGPC) to be illegal.
- New York State prohibited the Ku Klux Klan from being allowed to incorporate. The Klan was trying to do so in order to get around a law that required them to list the names of their members.
- Born:
  - Jean Nidetch, American business entrepreneur and founder of Weight Watchers in 1963; as Jean Slutsky, in Brooklyn, New York City, United States (d. 2015)
  - Krishna Chandra Sharma, Indian novelist and radio broadcast executive; in Kankhal, United Provinces, British India (present-day Uttarakhand state, India) (d. 2003)

== October 13, 1923 (Saturday) ==
- The capital of Turkey was moved to Ankara from Constantinople in advance of the October 29 declaration of the Republic of Turkey.
- The Soviet Union's secret intelligence agency, the NKVD, detonated the ammunition storage facility at Poland's Warsaw Citadel, killing 28 Polish Army soldiers and seriously injuring 40 others.
- By a vote of 316 to 24, Germany's Reichstag passed the Reichsermächtigungsgesetz emergency legislation transferring legislative powers to the government to take "in financial, economic and social spheres, the measures it deems necessary and urgent, regardless of the rights specified in the constitution of the Reich." Even with the German Nationalists boycotting the vote, the measure had more than the necessary two-thirds (306) votes needed for a constitutional change.
- Thuringian Prime Minister August Frölich allowed three Communists into his cabinet.
- Born: Faas Wilkes, Dutch footballer; as Servaas Wilkes, in Rotterdam, Netherlands (d. 2006)

== October 14, 1923 (Sunday) ==
- The longest hunger strike in Ireland's history began at Mountjoy Prison in Dublin as Michael Kilroy and other anti-Treaty prisoners ceased eating for six weeks, ending on November 23.
- A bomb exploded outside Cubs Park (now known as Wrigley Field) in Chicago, causing $5,000 in damage but no injuries. The incident was attributed to union agitators angry at an arbitration decision by Judge Kenesaw Mountain Landis, but no arrests were ever made.
- French president Alexandre Millerand declared that France had to increase its birth rate which had dropped since the war. The French feared that they may be dominated by the population of Germany in the future.
- Died:
  - George Whiting, 83, American composer of classical music (b. 1840)
  - Marcellus Emants, 75, Dutch novelist (b. 1848)

== October 15, 1923 (Monday) ==
- The New York Yankees beat the New York Giants 4–2 to win the World Series, four games to two.
- The Rentenmark Ordinance was published in Germany, allowing for the creation of the new Rentenmark currency equivalent to the old prewar "gold mark". Since gold was no longer available to back the German currency, the new money was to be backed by the value of land owned by businesses and farmers, in the form of a forced mortgage to the government, as part of a system devised by Finance Minister Hans Luther and Reichsbank President Hjalmar Schacht. The new currency was introduced 30 days later, with one rentenmark (RM) to replace one trillion papiermarks. A week earlier, the value of the papiermark had dropped to one U.S. dollar being worth 6.5 billion marks.
- "The Declaration of 46" was made by 46 leading Soviet Communists, led by Yevgeni Preobrazhensky and Leonid Serebryakov to the Politburo of the Central Committee of the Soviet Communist Party, supporting the concerns that leftist opposition Communists had about the Party. The vast majority of the persons who signed the Declaration would be executed under the rule of Joseph Stalin during the Great Purge of 1937.
- A group of three young men from the Bombay Weightlifting Club in India— Jal P. Bapasola, Rustom B. Bhumgara and Adi B. Hakim, set out from Bombay (now Mumbai) with the goal of becoming the first people to travel around the world by bicycle. They would return on March 18, 1928, after traveling 44,000 miles (71,000 km).
- The U.S. Senate Committee on Public Lands and Surveys began hearings on the California and Teapot Dome oil leases. Montana Senator Thomas J. Walsh headed the committee.
- A fire at a Brooklyn tenement killed six people, including George Keim, an aspiring playwright and theatrical producer, a day before his musical Ginger premiered on Broadway.
- Born:
  - Italo Calvino, Cuban journalist and writer; in Santiago de Las Vegas, Cuba (d. 1985)
  - Antonio Fontán, Spanish journalist and activist for freedom of the press; in Seville, Spain (d. 2010)

== October 16, 1923 (Tuesday) ==

- The Walt Disney Company was founded as Disney Brothers Cartoon Studio when 21-year-old Walt Disney, and his 30-year-old brother Roy O. Disney signed a contract to produce the Alice Comedies film series. Walt would later buy out most of Roy's half of the company in 1929.
- The patent for the dropped ceiling, now universal in room construction, was issued to Eric E. Hall, who had applied for it on May 28, 1919. U.S. Patent No. 1,470,728 for "Suspended Ceiling" was granted to Hall for a system that initially used interlocking tiles and was only accessible by removing tiles one at a time from one of the edges of the ceiling.
- Barsirian Arap Manyei, the last military and spiritual chief (Orkoiyot) of Kenya's Nandi people, was arrested by British East African authorities for planning an uprising against the colonial government. He would be incarcerated for almost 40 years, finally released from Mfangano Island before independence in 1962.
- Bavarian State Commissioner Gustav von Kahr issued a new decree banning communist organizations and dissemination of communist publications.
- Born:
  - Cyril Ponnamperuma, Sri Lankan biochemist; in Galle, Southern Province, Ceylon (present-day Sri Lanka) (d. 1994)
  - Bert Kaempfert, German orchestra leader; as Berthol Kämpfert, in Barmbek, Hamburg, Germany (d. 1980)

== October 17, 1923 (Wednesday) ==
- Reichswehr commander Alfred Müller moved German forces into Saxony and Thuringia, and placed Saxony's police forces under military control.
- General Müller also sent an ultimatum to Saxon Prime Minister Erich Zeigner ordering him to disavow statements by his Minister of Economics Paul Böttcher that called for the arming of the communist paramilitary organization known as the Proletarian Hundreds.
- Born:
  - Charles McClendon, American football player and coach; in Lewisville, Arkansas, United States (d. 2001)
  - Shivani, Indian novelist, her Hindi language novel Kariye Chima became a film, and other of her novels became television shows; as Gaura Pant, in Rajkot, Bombay Province, British India (present-day Gujarat, India) (d. 2003)
  - Cardinal Henryk Gulbinowicz, disgraced Roman Catholic Archbishop of Wroclaw; in Wilno, Poland (d. 2020)

== October 18, 1923 (Thursday) ==
- Igor Stravinsky's Octet premiered at the Paris Opera, conducted by Stravinsky himself, followed by the premiere of Sergei Prokofiev's Violin Concerto No. 1.
- The government of Greece announced that elections for the 398-seat Hellenic Parliament would take place on December 16.
- The Saxon parliament approved Erich Zeigner's rejection of the Müller ultimatum.
- The British Ministry of Transport sent a letter to all county councils urging them to take action against "unsightly" roadside billboards that were "disfiguring" the countryside.

== October 19, 1923 (Friday) ==
- Germany's chancellor Gustav Stresemann told the Cabinet that units of the Reichswehr had been ordered to invade Saxony and Thuringia, to "intimidate the extremist elements and restore public order and security."
- The first and only school shooting in New Zealand took place at the Waikino School in the village of Waikino on the North Island. The gunman shot seven students and the school's headmaster, killing two boys, aged 13 and 9. Five days later, an unknown person burned down the Waikino School The killer was found guilty of murder, but his death sentence was commuted based on his insanity and was committed to a mental hospital in Avondale, Auckland, where he died in 1938.
- In a luncheon speech in St. Louis, David Lloyd George said that Britain had "a right to give advice" to France. "We've a right to claim that the sacrifice which we made was not made to perpetuate strife and anger and wrong", he stated.
- The government of Mexican president Álvaro Obregón issued a statement accusing the recently departed Secretary of the Treasury Adolfo de la Huerta of fiscal mismanagement. "The Present Secretary of the Treasury on taking charge of the department found it in a state of complete bankruptcy through the fact that his predecessor had disposed of, without either authorization from those really responsible or on orders from the executive, several million pesos", the statement read.

== October 20, 1923 (Saturday) ==
- Zev, winner of the premier U.S. horse race, the Kentucky Derby, competed against Papyrus, winner of Britain's premier race, the Epsom Derby, at Belmont Park in New York. A crowd of 60,000 watched Zev win by five lengths for a prize of $100,000.
- The championship of Australian rules football, the title game of the Victoria Football League was played at Melbourne before a crowd of 46,566 and won by Essendon Bombers, with 8 goals and 15 points, over Fitzroy Maroons' 6 goals and 10 points. With goals worth 6 points, the score was the equivalent of 63 to 46.
- Born: V. S. Achuthanandan, Indian Communist politician, served as Chief Minister of Kerala State from 2006 to 2011; as Velikkakathu Sankaran Achuthanandan, in Alleppey, Kingdom of Travancore, British India (present-day Alappuzha, Kerala, India) (d. 2025)

== October 21, 1923 (Sunday) ==
- The Rhenish Republic was proclaimed at the city hall of Aachen in the occupied Rhineland, by separatist Leo Deckers.
- Voting was held in Austria for the 165-seat Nationalrat, the lower house of parliament. The Christlichsoziale Partei of Chancellor Ignaz Seipel lost its absolute majority (85 seats), falling one short to 82, but still had the plurality over the Sozialdemokratische Partei with 68 seats.
- Reichswehr troops began marching into Saxony with heavy weapons.
- At a worker's conference in Chemnitz, Germany, communist leader Heinrich Brandler called for a general strike as a means to launch a revolution, but received little support. The courier for Hamburg was not present and the decision to cancel the revolution did not reach that city in time.
- In Mexico City, five died in street clashes between supporters of president Álvaro Obregón and rival presidential candidate Adolfo de la Huerta.
- The Italian resort city of Imperia was created in Italy's Province of Imperia by order of Prime Minister Benito Mussolini, who ordered the combining of the cities of Oneglia and Porto Maurizio, along with the villages of Piani, Caramagna Ligure, Castelvecchio di Santa Maria Maggiore, Borgo Sant'Agata, Costa d'Oneglia, Poggi, Torrazza, Moltedo and Montegrazie.
- The film Unseeing Eyes, starring Lionel Barrymore, premiered at the Cosmopolitan Theatre in New York City.
- The films The Day of Faith and the John Ford-directed Cameo Kirby were released.
- Born: Jan Lopuszański, Polish theoretical physicist and co-author of the Haag–Lopuszanski–Sohnius theorem; in Lwow, Poland (present-day Lviv, Ukraine) (d. 2008)

== October 22, 1923 (Monday) ==
- Two pro-Royalist Lieutenant Generals of the Greek Army, Georgios Leonardopoulos and Panagiotis Gargalidis, staged a revolt of officers and attempted to overthrow the government of Greece before elections could take place, but were supported only in the northern part of the kingdom. The leader of the Army, General Theodoros Pangalos, rallied a counterattack and regained control of the entire country by October 25.
- Separatists at Duisburg set up a government for the newly proclaimed Rhenish Republic.

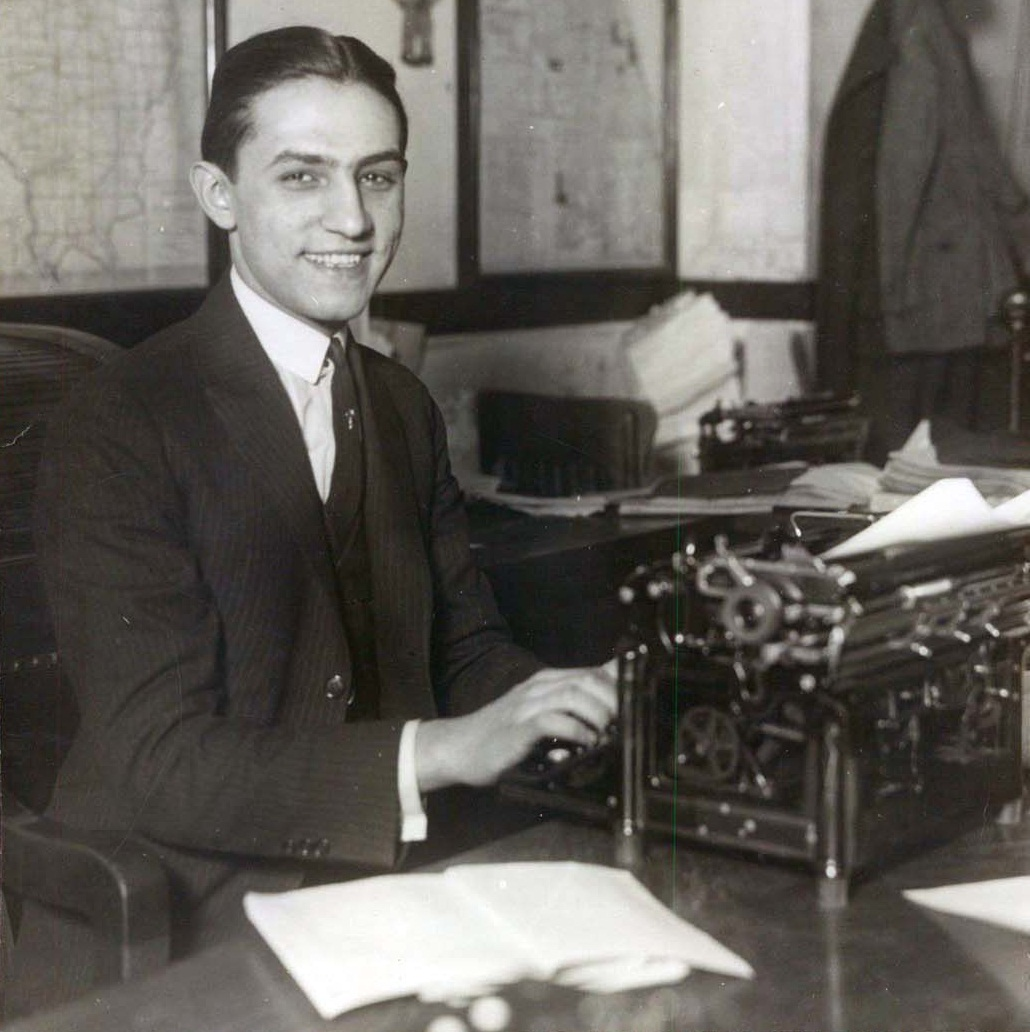
QWERTY champ Tangora at his typewriter

- Albert Tangora of Paterson, New Jersey, set the world record for fastest sustained typing on a manual typewriter, averaging 147 words per minute over one hour.
- The film On the Banks of the Wabash was released.
- Born: Pete Pihos, American professional football player, inductee to the Pro Football Hall of Fame and the College Football Hall of Fame, leader in pass receptions in the NFL for three consecutive seasons (1953, 1954, and 1955); in Orlando, Florida, United States (d. 2011)

== October 23, 1923 (Tuesday) ==
- The Hamburg Uprising began. Members of the Communist Party of Germany (KPD) attacked 17 police stations in Hamburg before dawn, along with seven elsewhere in the province, to acquire weapons.
- Oklahoma Governor Jack C. Walton was suspended from office after the Oklahoma House of Representatives voted, 80 to 17, to have him impeached on for misuse of public funds, and 75 to 23 for using the state national guard to disperse a grand jury. In the evening, the Oklahoma Senate voted, 38 to 1, to suspend Walton from office and for Lieutenant Governor Martin E. Trapp to become acting governor Walton obtained an injunction to prevent his immediate removal, but the Oklahoma Supreme Court ruled, 5 to 4, to uphold the removal order.
- The F. W. Murnau-directed film The Expulsion premiered in Germany.
- U.S. Patent No. 1,471,465 was awarded to Sebastian Hinton for the jungle gym.
- Born: Frank Sutton, American television actor known for portraying Sergeant Carter on Gomer Pyle, U.S.M.C.; in Clarksville, Tennessee, United States (d. 1974)

== October 24, 1923 (Wednesday) ==
- The Hamburg Uprising ended as hundreds of communists were arrested and hundreds more fled the city. News had reached Ernst Thälmann and the other local communist leaders that the nationwide revolution had been called off and that Hamburg was fighting alone. Orders were given to the communists at the end of the day to retreat. The final death toll was 61 civilians, 21 KPD members, and 17 police.
- The Sarajevo Philharmonic Orchestra performed its first concert.
- Born:
  - Sir Robin Day, English broadcaster and commentator, in London, England (d. 2000)
  - Denise Levertov, English-born American poet; as Priscilla Denise Levertoff, in Ilford, England (d. 1997)

== October 25, 1923 (Thursday) ==
- U.S. president Calvin Coolidge signed a proclamation establishing Carlsbad Caverns National Monument.
- The air force of the Kingdom of Bulgaria was wiped out when the army's only airplane crashed. After World War One, Bulgaria was allotted a single aircraft by the Treaty of Neuilly.
- The ballet La création du monde, by Darius Milhaud, was performed for the first time.
- Born:
  - J. Esmonde Barry, Canadian healthcare activist and political commentator; as Joseph Esmonde Barry, in Saint John, New Brunswick, Canada (d. 2007)
  - Russ Meyer, American professional baseball player; as Russell Meyer, in Peru, Illinois, United States (d. 1997)
  - Bobby Thomson, Scottish-born American professional baseball player; as Robert Thomson, in Glasgow, Scotland (d. 2010)
- Died: William Crooke, 75, British orientalist (b. 1848)

== October 26, 1923 (Friday) ==
- David Lloyd George visited Washington, D.C. and had a private hour-long meeting with U.S. Secretary of State Charles Evans Hughes.
- The Turkey national football team played its first game, a 2–2 draw against Romania at Taksim Stadium in Istanbul.

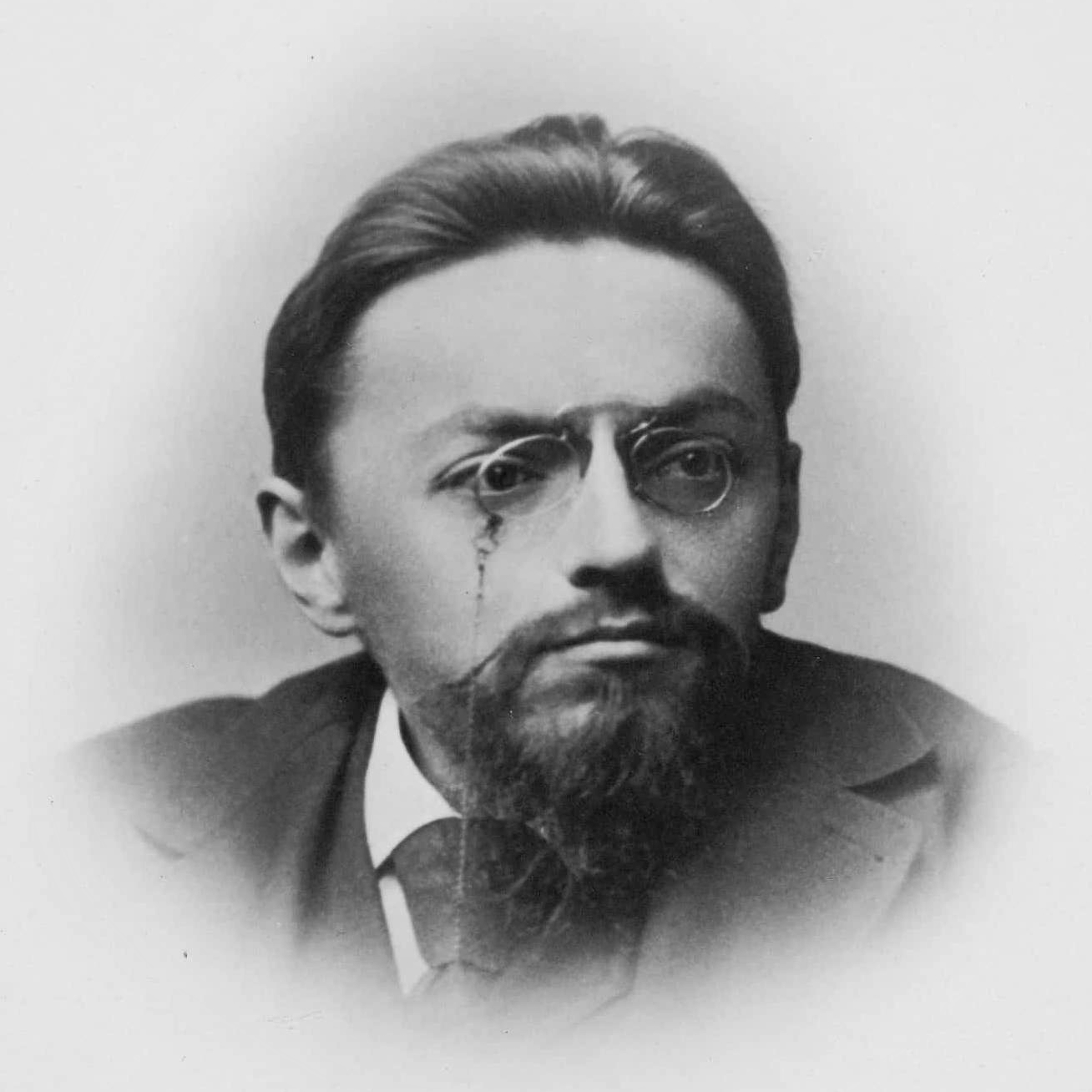
Steinmetz

- Died:
  - Karl Steinmetz, 58, German mathematician and electric engineer (b. 1865)
  - Dhanna Singh, 34–35, Sikh Indian revolutionary; killed himself and seven police officers in a suicide bombing while being arrested in Hoshiarpur in the Punjab Province of British India, including local police superintendent A.F. Horton (b. 1888)

== October 27, 1923 (Saturday) ==
- Vice President Bartolomé Martínez was inaugurated as President of Nicaragua, 15 days after the death of President Diego Chamorro, to fill the remaining 14 months of Chamorro's term. Martínez had been at his remotely-located farm, "El Bosque", at the time of Chamorro's sudden death, with no means of communication except by letter. After receiving a note from the Nicaraguan Congress, Martínez had traveled by mule to the city of Matagalpa, where he was able to get on a truck that took him on the recently completed dirt road to the capital at Managua.
- The United Kingdom and the Kingdom of Sweden signed the "Treaty between Great Britain and Sweden for the Marriage of Lady Louise Mountbatten with His Royal Highness Prince Gustaf Adolf, Crown Prince of Sweden", declaring that the two monarchies, "having judged it proper that an alliance should again be contracted between their respective Royal Houses by a marriage...have agreed upon and concluded the following Articles", declared that the marriage would be celebrated and duly authenticated in both nations and that the couple's financial settlements would be expressed in a separate marriage contract which was to be declared to be "an integral part of the present Treaty." The couple married one week later at London and ratifications were exchanged on November 12.
- Georgios Leonardopoulos and Panagiotis Gargalidis were forced to surrender before they could reach Athens, aborting their attempted coup against the Greek government.
- In Iceland, parliamentary voting was held for all 28 seats in the lower house of the Althing and for eight of the 14 seats in the upper house. The new Citizens' Party (Borgaraflokkurinn), led by Jón Magnússon, won most of the seats in both houses, with 16 of 28 in the lower, and 7 of the 14 in the upper house, and Magnússon would succeed Prime Minister Sigurthur Eggerz in March.
- In the aftermath of the Hamburg Uprising by members of the Communist Party of Germany (KPD), Chancellor Gustav Stresemann presented an ultimatum to Saxony's prime minister Erich Zeigner, demanding he remove KPD members from his Social Democrat and Communist coalition cabinet. Zeigner had two Communist Party members, Treasury Minister Paul Böttcher and Commerce Minister Fritz Heckert, in his seven-member cabinet.
- Twenty-three demonstrators were killed in Germany at a demonstration in Freiburg.
- Born: Roy Lichtenstein, American pop artist; in Manhattan, United States (d. 1997)

== October 28, 1923 (Sunday) ==
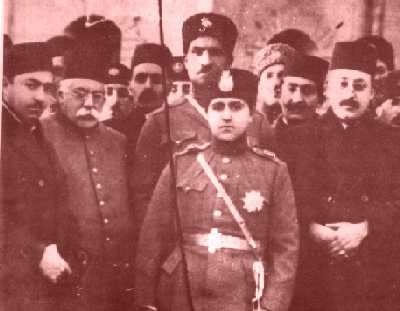
Reza Khan standing behind the man whom he would overthrow, Ahmad Shah

- Reza Khan became Prime Minister of Iran after being appointed by the reigning monarch, Ahmad Shah Qajar.
- Saxony's premier Erich Zeigner rejected German chancellor Stresemann's ultimatum to dismiss KPD members of his state cabinet.
- The submarine USS O-5 sank in the Panama Canal Zone after colliding with a United Fruit Company steamship, the Abangarez. Three lives were lost, but two others saved.
- Born: David Aronson, American painter; in Vilnius, Lithuania (d. 2015)
- Died: Theodor Reuss, 68, German occultist (b. 1855)

== October 29, 1923 (Monday) ==
- The Republic of Turkey (Türkiye Cumhuriyeti) was proclaimed by vote of the Grand National Assembly of Turkey, with Ankara as its new capital, formally bringing the Ottoman Empire to an end. Yunus Nadi Abalıoğlu read aloud the new proposed Constitution. Although the Sultanate was permanently abolished, the office of the Caliph as religious leader of Islam was temporarily retained.
- The first radio broadcast in Germany was made, coming from the Vox-Haus on Potsdamer Strasse. At 8:00 p.m., a presenter announced "Attention! Here is the Vox-Haus broadcasting station, on the 400 meter (equivalent to 750 kHz) frequency. We make the brief announcement that the Vox-Haus broadcasting station is commencing entertainment radio." The first song, played live, was Fritz Kreisler's composition for cello and piano.
- German president Friedrich Ebert invoked Article 48 of the constitution of Germany's Deutsches Reich, and authorized Chancellor Stresemann to remove government officials in Saxony from office. On Stresemann's orders Reichswehr troops occupied the government ministries of Dresden and forced Communist cabinet ministers out of their offices.
- The Broadway production Runnin' Wild, starring Flournoy Miller and Aubrey Lyles, opened at the New Colonial Theatre. The show featured a show-stopping tune by James P. Johnson called "The Charleston", which popularized the dance of the same name.

== October 30, 1923 (Tuesday) ==
- The first government of the Turkish Republic was formed with Mustafa Kemal Atatürk as president and İsmet İnönü as prime minister.
- Erich Zeigner resigned as Prime Minister of Saxony.
- Died: Andrew Bonar Law, 65, British statesman and politician, served as prime minister of the United Kingdom from October 1922 to May 1923; died of throat cancer (b. 1858)

== October 31, 1923 (Wednesday) ==
- A new government was installed in Saxony, composed exclusively of Social Democrats.
- The Victorian Police strike began in Melbourne, Australia on the eve of the Spring Racing Carnival.
- Born:
  - Li Lin, Chinese physicist known for her contributions to China's metallurgy, nuclear power, and high-temperature superconductivity programs; as Li Xizhi, in Beijing, Republic of China (present-day China) (d. 2003)
  - Lloyd Piper, Australian comic strip artist who became the third person to draw over the popular Ginger Meggs strip in 1973; in Cassilis, New South Wales, Australia (d. 1983)
