= 1926 Greek parliamentary election =

← 1923	7 November 1926	1928 →

All 286 seats in the Hellenic Parliament 144 seats needed for a majority
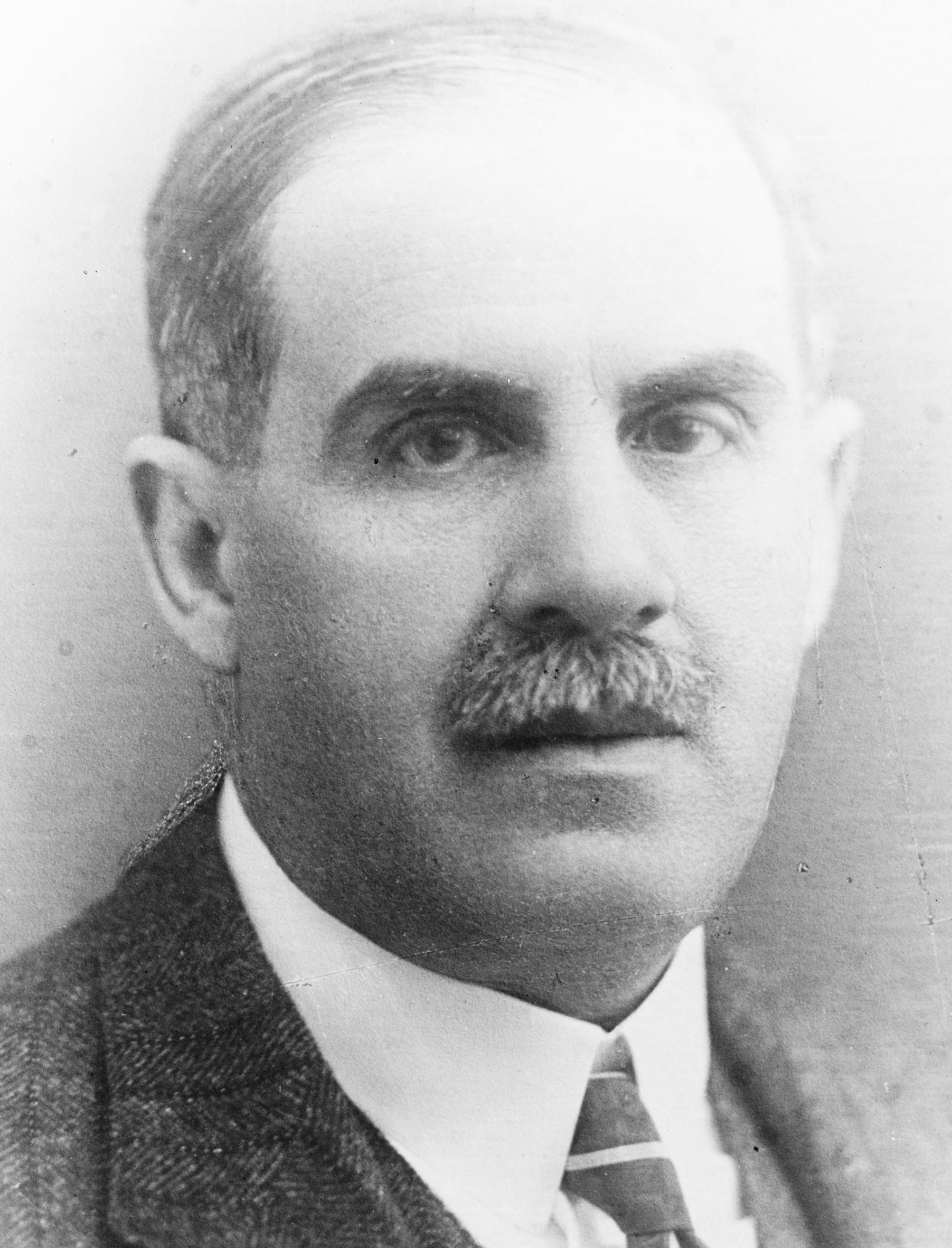

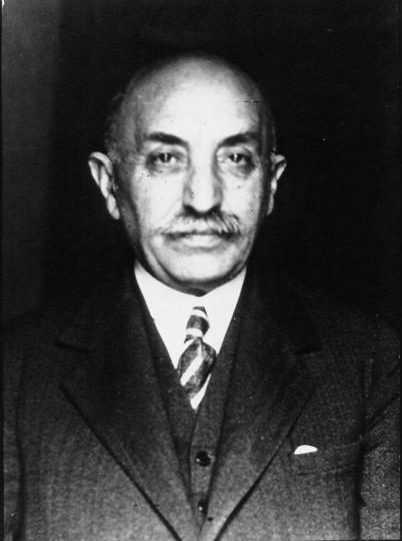

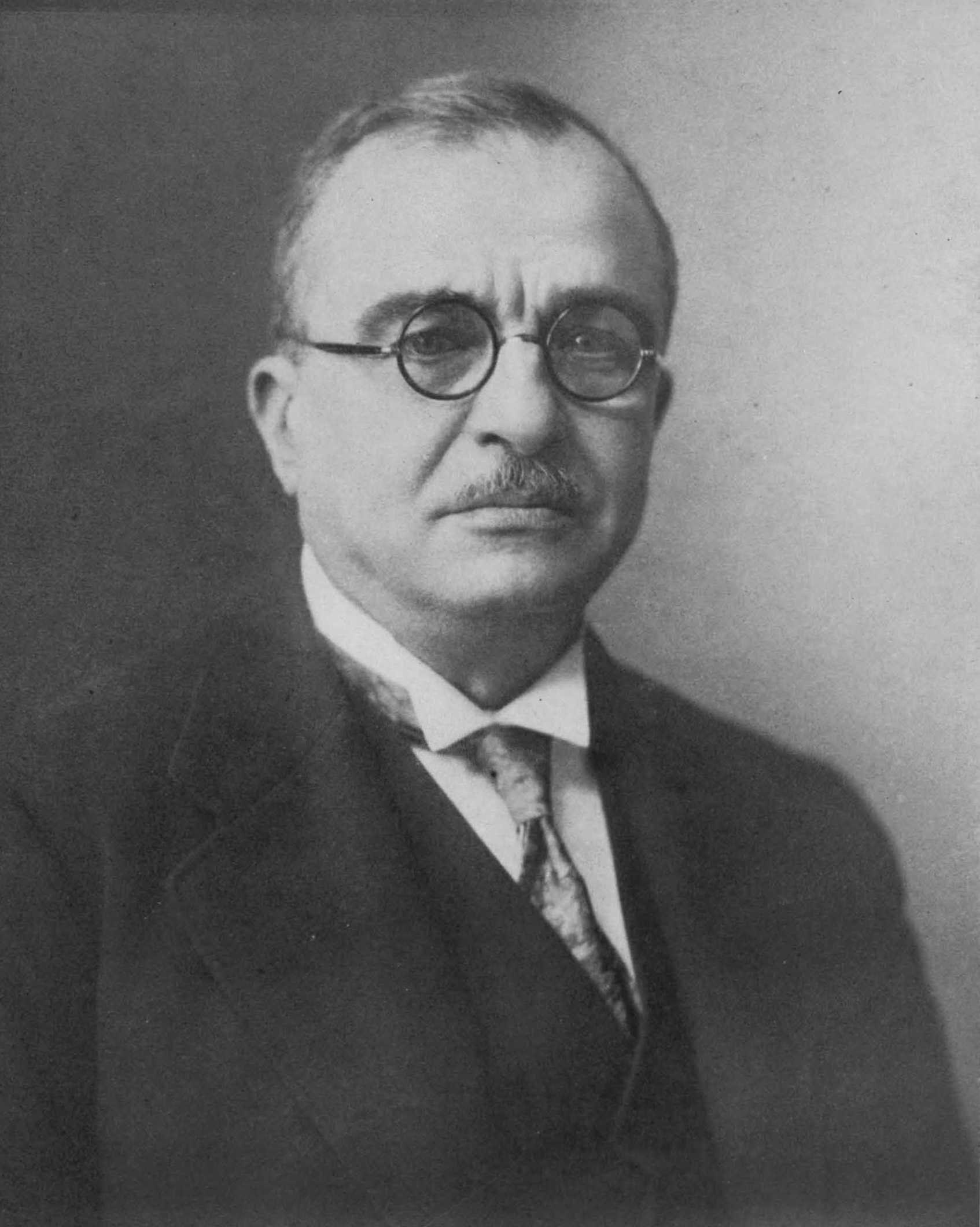

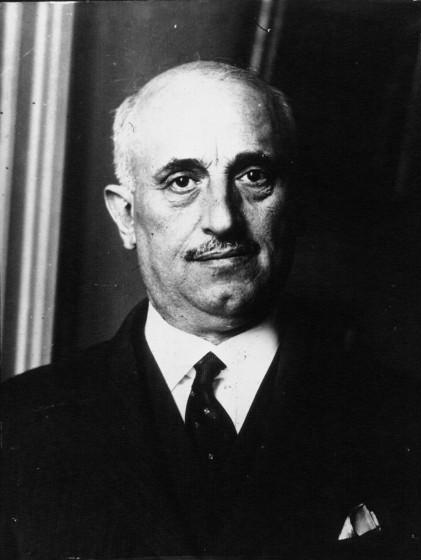
	First party	Second party	Third party
Leader	Georgios Kafantaris	Panagis Tsaldaris	Ioannis Metaxas
Party	Liberal	People's Party	KE
Last election	250 seats	–	–
Seats won	108	60	52
Seat change	▼142	New	New
Popular vote	303,140	194,243	151,044
	Fourth party	Fifth party	Sixth party
Leader	Alexandros Papanastasiou	Collective Leadership
Party	DE	EMEAP	AKE
Last election	120 seats	–	–
Seats won	17	10	4
Seat change	▼103	New	New
Popular vote	62,086	41,982	28,318
Prime Minister before election
Georgios Kondylis
DE
Prime Minister after election
Alexandros Zaimis
Independent

Parliamentary elections were held in Greece on 7 November 1926. The Liberal Union emerged as the largest faction in Parliament with 108 of the 286 seats. The composition of the new parliament meant that the parties and factions had to work together to form a viable parliamentary government. On Kafandaris' initiative, negotiations began among the main parties, leading to the swearing-in on the 4 December of a government under the premiership of Alexandros Zaimis who was not a member of parliament. The coalition consisted of the Liberal Union, the Democratic Union, the People's Party and the Freethinkers' Party. This government came to be known as the "Ecumenical government".

== Results ==
Party	Votes	%	Seats
Liberal Union	303,140		108
People's Party	194,243		60
Freethinkers' Party	151,044		52
Democratic Union	62,086		17
United Electoral Front of Workers, Farmers and Refugees	41,982		10
Agrarian Party of Greece	28,318		4
Party of Independents and Refugees	17,410		2
Liaison of United Anti-Venizelists	14,088		4
Liberal Refugee Party	13,798		4
Conservative Union	12,661		3
Provincial Party	9,728		2
Co-operation Agricultural Party	8,530		3
Party of Democratic Liberals	7,475		3
Liaison of Independent Democrat-Venizelists	5,942		3
Hebrew Political Union	5,846		2
Liaison of Independent Liberals	5,846		1
Liaison of Moderate Conservatives	5,463		1
Liaison of Independent Anti-Venizelists	5,367		1
Agricultural Refugee Liaison	5,079		1
Macedonian OMAS Liaison	5,079		2
National Believers Popular Party	4,888		1
Liaison of Independents (Trikala Prefecture)	3,450		1
Liaison of Popular-Free Believers	3,450		1
Total			286
Valid votes	958,392	99.59	
Invalid/blank votes	3,912	0.41	
Total votes	962,304	100.00	
Registered voters/turnout	1,567,378	61.40	
Source: Nohlen & Stöver (Note: Although the total votes for parties winning seats comes to 914,913, the Electoral Committees reported a total of 958,392 valid votes being cast.)
