= Conservative Union =

Conservative Union may refer to:

- Conservative Union (Greece)
- Conservative Union (Spain)
- CDU/CSU
