= Athanasios Papapanagiotou =

Greek doctor and politician

- Born: 1886; Metaxades, Greece
- Died: Unknown
- Occupations: Doctor, politician
- Political party: Democratic Union (Greece)

Athanasios Papapanagiotou (Greek: Αθανάσιος Παπαπαναγιώτου) was a doctor and politician, born in Metaxades, Greece in 1886. He was a doctor in Metaxades and the surrounding areas, and the first member of parliament for Evros (1926 - 1928) with the Democratic Union Party of Alexandros Papanastasiou.

== Career ==
=== Medical career ===
He served as the chief physician of the community of Metaxades and the surrounding villages, providing medical care to the local population. His presence as a doctor in Metaxades was crucial for the area, as the rare availability of medical coverage in the rural communities of Thrace at that time made his position important for the residents.

=== Political career ===
In 1926, he was elected Member of Parliament for the electoral district of Evros with the Democratic Union Party of Alexandros Papanastasiou and served in the Hellenic Parliament until 1928. In doing so, he became the first MP to represent the Evros regional unit in the Greek parliament. His term coincided with the democratic currents of the time; however, there are no further records of legislative work or ministerial positions.

He also served as the President of Metaxades at some point between 1928 and 1960, although the exact year is unclear.
