= Leonardopoulos–Gargalidis coup attempt =

1923 Greek pro-royalist military coup attempt

The Leonardopoulos–Gargalidis coup attempt (Greek: Κίνημα Λεοναρδόπουλου-Γαργαλίδη) was a failed military coup launched on 22 October 1923 (9 October O.S.) in the Kingdom of Greece by pro-royalist military officers under the Lieutenant Generals Georgios Leonardopoulos and Panagiotis Gargalidis, and the Colonel Georgios Ziras. Its failure discredited the monarchy and contributed decisively to the establishment of the Second Hellenic Republic in March 1924.

== Background ==
Following the Greek defeat in the Asia Minor Campaign against Turkey, the Greek Army, led by Venizelist Colonels Nikolaos Plastiras and Stylianos Gonatas, overthrew the royalist government in September 1922 and forced King Constantine I into renewed exile. His eldest son, George II succeeded him, but the position of the monarchy remained precarious. The military-led "Revolutionary Government" tried and convicted six leading royalists to death as scapegoats for the country's military defeat, and gradually steered the country in the direction of a republic. On 18 October 1923, the Revolutionary Government proclaimed elections to be held on 16 December for a National Assembly which would decide on the country's future form of government. The Revolutionary Government however, headed by Gonatas, had passed an electoral law which heavily favoured the Venizelist Liberal Party and the other anti-monarchist parties.

The prospect of the elections and an almost-certain regime change led to the creation of a heterogeneous coalition in the ranks of the army, which aimed to overthrow the government. Its main driving force was the so-called "Majors' Organization" (Οργάνωση Ταγματαρχών) of royalist middle-ranking officers, which was in close contact with the royalist former Deputy Chief of the Army General Staff and future dictator, General Ioannis Metaxas, but several disgruntled Venizelists, most prominently Leonardopoulos and Gargalidis, also joined. The conspirators managed to win over the bulk of the military units in northern Greece and the Peloponnese, but failed to make inroads in the garrisons of Athens, Thessaloniki or the other major cities, as well as in the overwhelmingly Venizelist Navy.

== The coup attempt ==
Metaxas had advised that the coup should take place in Athens, the country's nerve centre, but in the event, it was launched in the provinces in the early hours of 22 October. In its initial stages it proved rapidly successful: by the morning, in the entire Greek mainland, only the cities of Athens, Thessaloniki, Larissa and Ioannina remained under government control. The government was initially caught by surprise but soon rallied. General Theodoros Pangalos, the head of the Army, launched energetic countermeasures, while the putschists prevaricated.

In Thessaloniki, Venizelist officers led by General Georgios Kondylis preempted the coup from taking over the city, and subsequently confronted the rebel forces under Colonel Ziras. The government forces prevailed and reestablished control over northern Greece by October 25, while Ziras himself fled to Yugoslavia. In the Peloponnese, Leonardopoulos and Gargalidis with their troops crossed the Isthmus of Corinth and marched towards Athens, but were surrounded by government troops and forced to surrender unconditionally on 27 October.

== Aftermath ==
The failed coup was a turning point in Greek history, as the royalist cause was comprehensively defeated, at least for the moment. In the coup's aftermath, the royalist faction lost in influence and was effectively decapitated. More than 1200 royalist officers were dismissed from the Greek Armed Forces. Leonardopoulos and Gargalidis were court-martialled and sentenced to death, although they were eventually pardoned. Ioannis Metaxas, who was in Corinth at the time of the coup, managed to flee the country and went to exile in Italy. The royalist parties abstained from the December elections, paving the way for the electoral triumph of the Venizelist parties. King George II left the country on 19 December, and on 25 March 1924, a presidential Republic was proclaimed. Its short existence would be troubled by coups and counter-coups amidst the ever-continuing conflict between Venizelists and royalists, until the restoration of the monarchy in yet another coup in October 1935.
