= François Léon Jouinot-Gambetta =

French army officer (1870–1923)

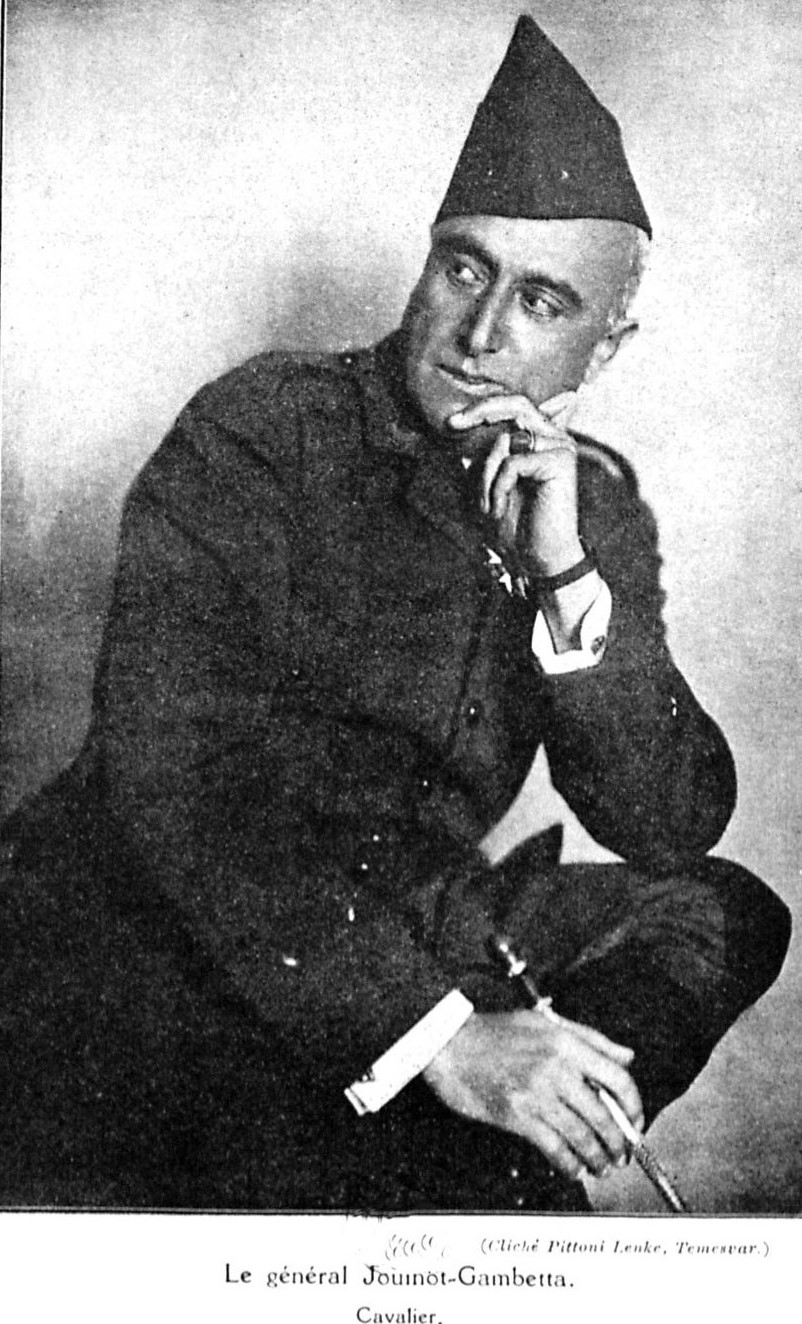
- Jouinot-Gambetta in 1920
- Born: 6 July 1870; Paris, France
- Died: 9 November 1923 (aged 53); Antibes, Alpes-Maritimes
- Military career
- Allegiance: France
- Branch: French Army
- Service years: 1888–1923
- Rank: Général de division
- Conflicts: First World War
- Awards: Grand officer of the Legion of Honour; Colonial Medal; officer of the Order of the Black Star; officer of the Order of Glory (Tunisia); knight of the Order of Saint Anna; officer of the Imperial Order of the Dragon of Annam; chevalier of the Order of Agricultural Merit; Médaille d'honneur de la mutualité

François Léon Jouinot-Gambetta (French: [fʁɑ̃swa leɔ̃ ʒwino ɡɑ̃bɛta]; 6 July 1870 – 9 November 1923) was a French army officer. He joined the army as a cavalry trooper in 1888 and was commissioned in 1893. Jouinot-Gambetta initially specialised in geographical surveying and was deployed across French African territories. He was wounded in 1900 during a mission in Mauritania. In the first years of the 20th century Jouinot-Gambetta served with the Ministry of Foreign Affairs and the War Ministry. During the First World War he commanded a cavalry brigade on the Macedonian front and was responsible for a rapid advance that captured Skopje from the Bulgarians.

== Early life ==
Jouinot-Gambetta was born in Paris on 6 July 1870. He was the son of Benedetta Gambetta and Antoine Jouinot, an engineer. He was a nephew of the politician Léon Gambetta. Jouinot-Gambetta's father died in 1871.

== Enlisted career ==
Jouinot-Gambetta enlisted for a 5-year service in the French Army on 4 December 1888, joining the 6th Regiment of the Chasseurs d'Afrique as a trooper on 4 December 1888. His service began in French Algeria. He was promoted to the rank of brigadier (equivalent to corporal) on 6 July 1889 and to maréchal des logis (equivalent to sergeant) on 3 October 1890.

Jouinot-Gambetta transferred to the Sudan squadron of the 1st Regiment of Spahis on 20 December 1891. Seven days later he deployed with them to French Sudan. Jouinot-Gambetta left Sudan on 11 February 1893.

== Pre-war officer career ==
Jouinot-Gambetta transferred to the 9th Regiment of Hussars on 18 August 1893, becoming an officer cadet in addition to his role as maréchal des logis. He was commissioned as a sub-lieutenant on 23 March 1895 and promoted to lieutenant on 23 March 1897. In this period Jouinot-Gambetta developed a specialism in geographical surveying.

Jouinot-Gambetta was deployed to French West Africa from 20 January 1900 to 27 April 1901. During this time he participated in the Blanchet Expedition to present-day Western Sahara and Mauritania. In his report he warned of the danger to the French colonial administration posed by Sheikh Ma al-'Aynayn who he said was a fanatical Muslim determined to eject the French from the area. The sheikh later rose in revolt and was defeated by French troops under General Charles Emile Moinier at Fez on 23 June 1910. He was shot and wounded in the left thigh on 9 June 1900 at Atar, Mauritania. Jouinot-Gambetta was appointed a chevalier of the Legion of Honour on 29 December 1900.

Jouinot-Gambetta transferred to the 1st Regiment of Hussars 27 April 1901. He was deployed to Algeria again on 30 June 1901 and would remain there until 1 August 1903. On 25 September 1901 Jouinot-Gambetta transferred to the 2nd Regiment of Chasseurs d'Afrique, 18 days later he was promoted to captain in the 1st Regiment of Spahis.

Upon his return to France Jouinot-Gambetta was appointed to a position at the Ministry of Foreign Affairs, specialising in ordnance. He served in Morocco from 1 October 1904 to 1 November 1905, which included a mission to meet with the Sultan of that country at Tangier. On 12 November 1905 he was appointed to a position at the Ministry of War, whilst administratively being part of the 2nd Regiment of Cuirassiers. In 1906 he was a member of minister Eugène Étienne's staff. He had responsibility for drawing up that years promotion lists and admitted favouring his old Jesuit college friends who he thought had been disadvantaged by the actions of the anti-clerical ministry of Louis André.

Jouinot-Gambetta was promoted to chef d'escadrons (major) on 25 March 1906. He transferred to the 6th Regiment of Chasseurs d'Afrique on 19 October 1906 and deployed again to Algeria on 5 February 1907. Jouinot-Gambetta was appointed an officer of the Legion on Honour on 10 July 1907,

During his early career Jouinot-Gambetta was awarded the Colonial Medal with clasps for Sudan, Senegal and West Africa. He was also appointed an officer of the Order of the Black Star by Dahomey on 25 February 1901, an officer of the Tunisian Order of Glory on 25 February 1901, a knight of the Russian Order of Saint Anna on 29 September 1901 and an officer of the Imperial Order of the Dragon of Annam on 18 April 1903. Aside from his military awards he was appointed a chevalier of the Order of Agricultural Merit on 27 March 1902 and awarded a silver Médaille d'honneur de la mutualité in April 1903. British military historian Cyril Falls has described Jouinot-Gambetta as "a hard bitten, hard-drinking Frenchman with an immortal name".

== First World War ==
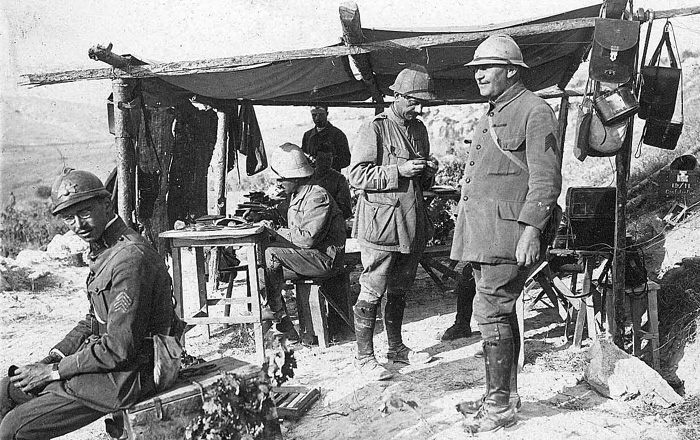
Jouinot-Gambetta on the Macedonian front, 1917.

By the start of the First World War in 1914 Jouinot-Gambetta was a colonel. He was appointed a commander of the Legion of Honour on 30 January 1915. In 1917 Jouinot-Gambetta was appointed to command a brigade of three regiments of Spahis and Chasseurs d'Afrique with the Armée d'Orient on the Macedonian front.

In late September General Louis Franchet d'Espèrey ordered Jouinot-Gambetta to advance on Skopje during the Vardar Offensive. Jouinot-Gambetta led his brigade into the midst of a retreating mass of Bulgarians, navigating pockets of resistance from German troops. His brigade advanced along the Crna River and took Prilep on 23 September. Skopje was captured, without resistance, on 29 September. During the advance Jouinot-Gambetta's brigade had covered 57 miles (92 km) in six days. On 21 October 1918, Jouinot-Gambetta's Moroccan troops entered Negotin, where they were met with a resistance from the retreating German troops. After a short fight, the Germans retreated. Two days later, on 23 October 1918, the Negotin city council unanimously declared Jouinot-Gambetta an honorary citizen of Negotin.

== Post-war ==
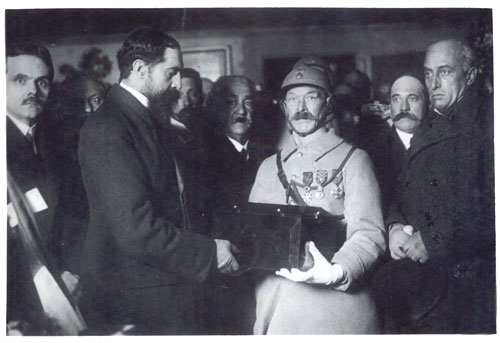
In 1920, placing the heart of Léon Gambetta in the Panthéon, Paris.

Jouinot-Gambetta was appointed a grand officer of the Legion of Honour on 22 January 1919. He afterwards was promoted to général de division. Jouinot-Gambetta died in Antibes, Alpes-Maritimes, on 9 November 1923.

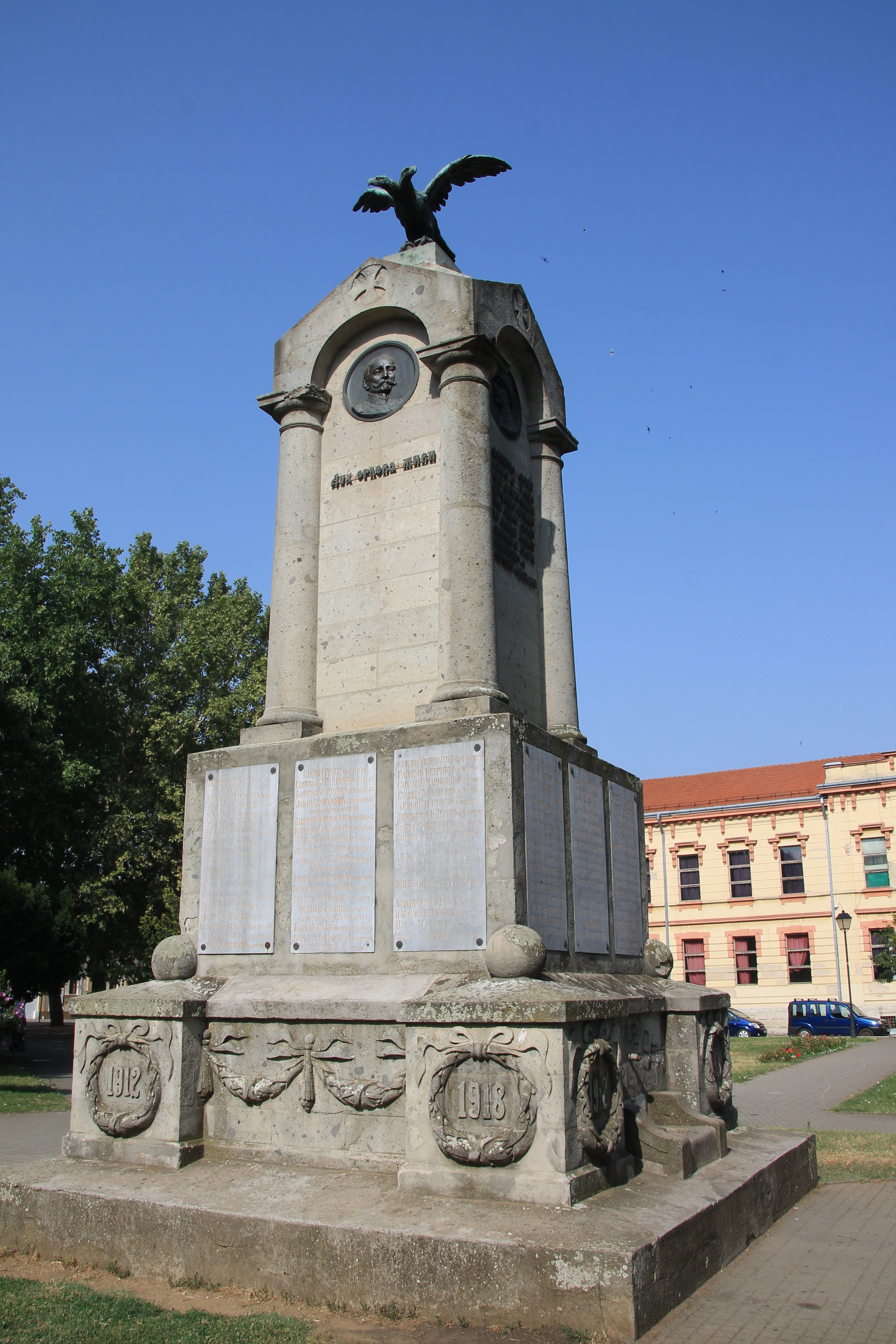
In 1930, the Monument to the liberators and General Gambetta was unveiled in Negotin.

On 12 October 1930, the Monument to the liberators and General Gambetta (Spomenik oslobodiocima i generalu Gambeti u Negotinu) was unveiled in Negotin, Serbia (then Kingdom of Yugoslavia) in the presence of Jouinot-Gambetta's widow Blanche Augustine Haÿ.
