= Liaison of United Anti-Venizelists =

The Liaison of United Anti-Venizelists was a political party in Greece in the 1920s.

== History ==
The party first contested national elections in 1926, when they won four seats in the parliamentary elections with 1.5% of the national vote. However, the party did not contest any further elections.
