= Vardar offensive =

World War I military operation

- Part of the Macedonian front and Balkan Front of World War I
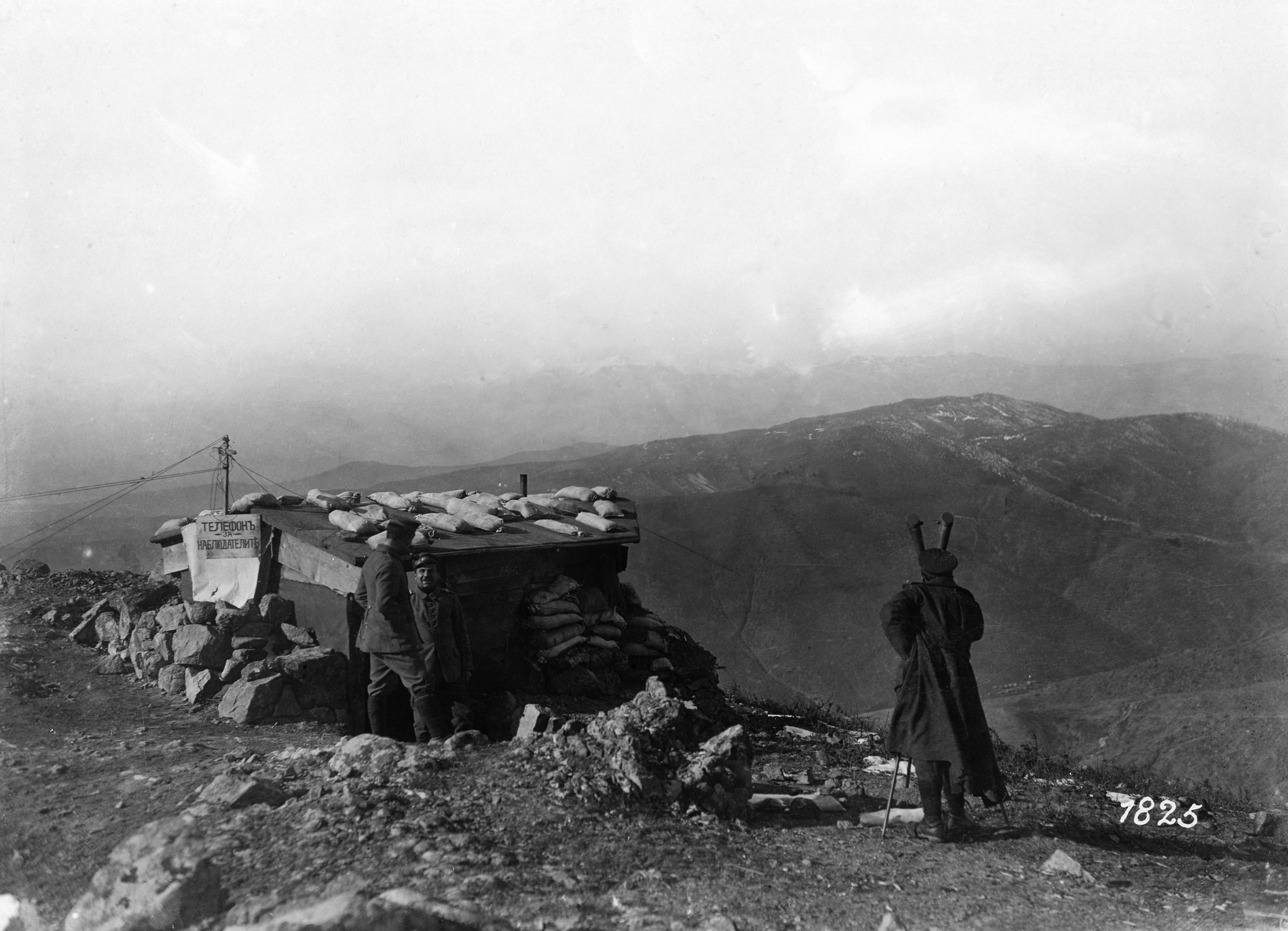
- A Bulgarian telephone station at Doiran Lake, March 1917
Date	15–29 September 1918
Location	Vardar Macedonia, Bulgarian-occupied Kingdom of Serbia and Kingdom of Greece (present-day North Macedonia and Greece)
Result	Allied victory; Armistice of Salonica

Belligerents
Bulgaria; Germany	Serbia; France; United Kingdom; Greece; Italy

Commanders and leaders
(German Empire) Friedrich von Scholtz; (German Empire) Kuno von Steuben; (Tsardom of Bulgaria (1908–1946)) Georgi Todorov; (Tsardom of Bulgaria (1908–1946)) Hristo Burmov; (Tsardom of Bulgaria (1908–1946)) Stefan Nerezov; (Tsardom of Bulgaria (1908–1946)) Vladimir Vazov	(French Third Republic) Louis F. d'Esperey; (French Third Republic) Paul Prosper Henrys; (Kingdom of Serbia) Živojin Mišić; (Kingdom of Serbia) Petar Bojović; (Kingdom of Serbia) Stepa Stepanović; (United Kingdom of Great Britain and Ireland) George Milne; (United Kingdom of Great Britain and Ireland) Henry Wilson; (Kingdom of Greece) Panagiotis Danglis; (Kingdom of Greece) Panagiotis Gargalidis; (Kingdom of Italy) Ernesto Mombelli

Units involved
(German Empire) Army Group Scholtz: (German Empire) 11th Army (Note: The German 11th Army was composed of mostly Bulgarian divisions.); (Tsardom of Bulgaria (1908–1946)) 1st Army	Allied Army of the Orient: (French Third Republic) Armée d'Orient; (Kingdom of Serbia) 1st Army (Note: The Serbian armies were corps sized formations.); (Kingdom of Serbia) 2nd Army; (United Kingdom of Great Britain and Ireland) Salonika Army; (Kingdom of Greece) Serres Division; (Kingdom of Greece) Cretan Division; (Kingdom of Italy) 35th Division

Strength
(Tsardom of Bulgaria (1908–1946)) 2 armies; 500 artillery pieces	(French Third Republic) 3 divisions; 822 artillery pieces; (Kingdom of Serbia) 2 corps; (Kingdom of Greece) 6 divisions; (United Kingdom of Great Britain and Ireland) 4 divisions; (Kingdom of Italy) 1 division

Casualties and losses
(Tsardom of Bulgaria (1908–1946)) Unknown dead and wounded; 77,000 captured; 500 artillery pieces lost	(French Third Republic) 3,449; (Kingdom of Serbia) 3,215; (United Kingdom of Great Britain and Ireland) 4,589; (Kingdom of Greece) 5,295; (Kingdom of Italy) 747; Total: 17,295 casualties

The Vardar offensive (Bulgarian: Офанзива при Вардар) was a World War I military operation, fought between 15 and 29 September 1918. The operation took place during the final stage of the Balkan Front. On 15 September, a combined force of Serbian, French, and Greek troops attacked the Bulgarian-held trenches in Dobro Pole ("Good Field"), at the time part of the Bulgarian-occupied Kingdom of Serbia and the Kingdom of Greece (present-day North Macedonia and Greece). The assault and the preceding artillery preparation had devastating effects on Bulgarian morale, eventually leading to mass desertions.

On 18 September, a second Entente formation assaulted the Bulgarian positions in the vicinity of Doiran Lake. Effectively employing machine gun and artillery fire the Bulgarians managed to stall the Allied advance on the Doiran sector. However the collapse of the front at Dobro Pole forced the Bulgarians to withdraw from Doiran. The Allies pursued the German 11th Army and the Bulgarian 1st Army, while pushing deeper into Vardar Macedonia. By 29 September, the Allies had captured the former HQ of Skopje, thus endangering the remnants of the 11th Army.

The parallel development of the anti-monarchist Radomir Rebellion forced Bulgaria to sign the Armistice of Salonica and withdraw from the war. The treaty included the full capitulation of the 11th Army, bringing the final tally of Bulgarian and German prisoners to 77,000 and granting the Allies 500 artillery pieces. The Bulgarian downfall turned the strategic and operational balance of the war against the Central Powers. The Macedonian Front was brought to an end at noon on 30 September, when the ceasefire came into effect.

== Prelude ==
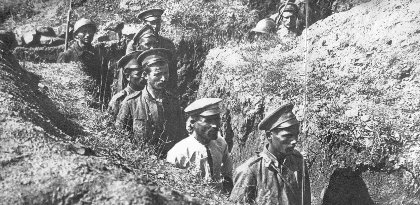
Bulgarian prisoners of war captured at Skra

The 28 June 1914, assassination of Austro-Hungarian heir presumptive Archduke Franz Ferdinand precipitated Austria-Hungary's declaration of war against Serbia. The conflict quickly attracted the involvement of all major European countries, pitting the Central Powers against the Entente coalition and starting World War I.

Serbia was defeated during the autumn 1915 phase of the Serbian campaign, prompting France and Britain to transfer troops from the Gallipoli campaign to Greek Macedonia. The Macedonian front was thus established in an effort to support the remnants of the Serbian army to conquer Vardar Macedonia.

On 17 August 1916, in the Struma operation Bulgaria invaded Greece, easily conquering all Greek territory east of the Struma, since the Greek Army was ordered not to resist by the pro-German King Constantine. The surrender of territory recently won with difficulty in the Second Balkan War of 1913 was the last straw for many supporters of Liberal Party politician Eleftherios Venizelos. With Allied assistance, they launched a coup which secured Thessaloniki and most of Greek Macedonia, causing the National Schism. In June 1917, the Venizelists gained full control of the country, immediately declaring war on the Central Powers and joining the Allied Army of the Orient operating on the Balkan Front. The Greek entry into the war along with the 24 division reinforcements that the Army had received in the spring of the same year had created a strategic advantage for the Entente.

On 30 May 1918, the Allies launched an offensive on the heavily fortified Skra salient, commencing the Battle of Skra-di-Legen. Utilizing the cover of heavy artillery a Franco-Hellenic force made a rapid push into the enemy trenches, conquering Skra and the surrounding system of fortifications. Greek casualties amounted to 434–440 killed in action, 154–164 missing in action and 1,974–2,220 wounded, France lost approximately 150 men killed or injured. A total of 1,782 soldiers of the Central Powers became prisoners of war, including a small number of German engineers and artillery specialists that served in Bulgarian units; considerable amounts of military equipment also fell into Entente hands. The plan for a Bulgarian counterattack against Skra remained unfulfilled as the Bulgarian soldiers refused to take part in the operation. Both the Greek and the French press used the opportunity to extol the efforts of the Greek army, favorably influencing the Greek mobilization.

The fall of Skra prompted Bulgarian prime minister Vasil Radoslavov to resign on 21 June 1918. Aleksandar Malinov who assumed office immediately afterwards pursued secret negotiations with Britain, offering Bulgaria's exit from the war with the condition that Bulgaria fully retain eastern Macedonia. However, British prime minister David Lloyd George rejected the proposal, assuring the Greek ambassador in London Ioannis Gennadius, that Britain would not act against Greek interests.

In late July 1918, Bulgarian commander-in-chief Nikola Zhekov sent German Field Marshal Paul von Hindenburg a message regarding a rumored Entente offensive, and detailed Bulgaria's inability to adequately defend the Vardar portion of the front. Zhekov requested that Germany immediately reinforce the Balkan Front, hinting that Austria-Hungary would also be required to strengthen its positions in Albania. On 17 August, Hindenburg pledged to provide Bulgaria with support once the situation on other front permits it. Hindenburg's reluctance to support Bulgaria was also manifested by the early September redeployment of the last German Jäger battalion stationed in Macedonia back into Germany.

The Bulgarians, using information from escaped prisoners of war, determined that Entente forces would engage in hostile actions west of lake Ohrid, in Monastir, Dobro Pole or Human. On 27 August, the 2nd and 3rd Bulgarian Divisions stationed at Dobro Pole were ordered to make emergency preparations, as new evidence indicated a frontal assault on Dobro Pole along with a secondary attack on Human. By 7 September, Dobro Pole was reinforced by one machine gun company, six infantry battalions and ten heavy howitzers, the head of Army Group Scholtz General Friedrich von Scholtz then stated that the defensive measures made the defense of the front feasible. Scholtz had failed to take into account the departure of Bulgarian chief of staff Nikola Zhekov and his subsequent replacement by Georgi Todorov. Widespread insubordination and desertions also plagued the Bulgarian troops who refused to participate in fortification works; poor rations and fatigue contributed to the low morale.

A day prior to the Entente offensive, General Louis Franchet d'Espèrey laid out the final plan for the operation. The first phase consisted of a combined Franco-Serbian attack on the positions of the 2nd and 3rd Bulgarian Divisions, which was expected to create a breach of the front line in the area of Dobro Pole, while also posing a danger to the Bulgarian supply lines on river Vardar. The 1,875-metre (6,152 ft) Dobro Pole ("Good Field") peak dominated the region, providing excellent observation points for the defenders. Dobro Pole was surrounded by a well-developed system of trenches which, in combination with the rough terrain, made the area impassable for wheeled transport. Dobro Pole was, however, lower and less steep than the mountains on other parts of the front that averaged 2,000 metres (6,600 ft).

A second Anglo-Franco-Hellenic force would then attack the Bulgarian 1st Army between the Vardar river and Doiran Lake, preventing it from forming new defensive positions in the area. The initial advance would allow the Armée d'Orient to progress in support of other units first to Prilep, Disma and Borran. In the meantime, an Anglo-Hellenic force would strike Mount Belasica, occupying the Rupel Pass. The Doiran sector had previously been subject to two major Entente offensives known as the First Battle of Doiran (August 1916) and Second Battle of Doiran (April–May 1917). Both engagements ended in decisive Bulgarian victories, forcing the Allies to limit their operations to small raids and harassing fire. Between 1916 and July 1918, Bulgarian defenses around Doiran underwent a period of considerable reorganization under the personal supervision of General Vladimir Vazov. The sector was divided into two 14-kilometre (8.7 mi) defensive areas, protected by the Mountain Division and the 9th Infantry Division respectively. Bulgaria established combat security outposts at a distance of 2 kilometres (1.2 mi) from the enemy trenches, while also reinforcing the defenses of the dominant Dub and Kala Tepe mountains. Similarly to Dobro Pole the defenses consisted of a series of mutually supporting trenches, with built in observation posts, machine gun positions and artillery pieces.

D'Espèrey expected to march the Allied Army of the Orient through the towns of Demir Hisar, Rupel, Petrici, Blagusa, Gradec, Štip and Belessa finally seizing Skopje. Units stationed at Katsania and Tetovo would prevent a Bulgarian flanking maneuver, while the main body of the force would widen the breach both in Štip and Prilep. In case of a collapse of the front between Dobro Pole and Tzena, the Bulgarian 1st Army and the German 11th Army (Note: The 11th German Army consisted of Bulgarian soldiers commanded by German officers.) would either be annihilated or, in less favorable circumstances, perform an organised retreat to a new defensive line on river Crna. The prevention of such a retreat was to be achieved by a rapid, penetrating attack on Gradsko, Dren Planina and Visoka.

== Offensive ==
=== Battle of Dobro Pole ===
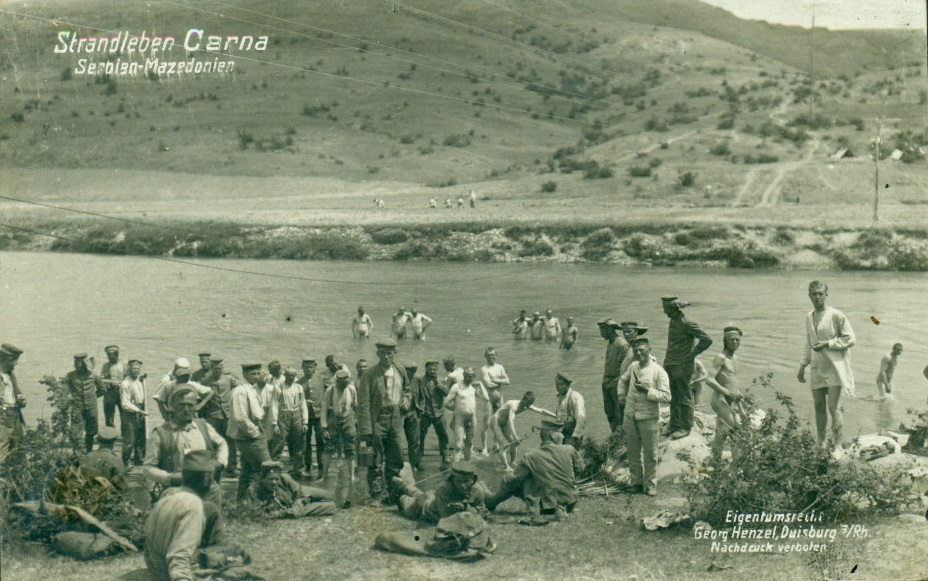
German soldiers bathing in the Crna river in 1918

At 8 a.m. on 14 September 1918, Entente forces commenced a 566-gun artillery barrage on enemy positions. Their aircraft also bombed enemy positions and strafed a 250-truck column moving towards Kozjak. On the same day, Scholtz sent Hindenburg a telegraph stating that

... all indications point out that an enemy offensive will target the 11th Army on both sides of Vardar as well as Dobro Pole....

The Bulgarian high command did not attempt to perform a spoiling attack as they lacked the necessary vehicles and pack animals. The barrage did not cause a significant number of casualties but severely affected the Bulgarian esprit de corps. On the night between 14 and 15 September, Franco-Serbian patrols reported that the artillery barrage had dealt sufficient damage to the barbed wire entanglements separating the trenches.

At 5:30 a.m. on 15 September, the French 122nd and 17th (Colonial) Divisions struck Sokol, Dobro Pole, Kravitski Kamene and Kravitsa while the Serbian Shumadia Division assaulted Kamene and Veternik. The Greek Archipelago Division, 3rd Division and 4th Division under Panagiotis Gargalidis acted as a link between the Serbian and French troops without entering combat. The offensive immediately caused a wave of mass desertion among the Bulgarian units; the remaining infantrymen and artillery squadrons were not able to hold their ground. During the course of the battle, the 122nd Division broke into two columns and suffered heavy casualties. The left column managed to reach a position located 50 metres (160 ft) from Sokol at 6:30 a.m. and take the peak at the end of the day. At 16:00 pm, the right column captured Dobro Pole after rushing a 200-metre (660 ft) segment of steep terrain. The 17th Division seized Kravitsa at 7:00 am, suppressing the last signs of resistance.

Two Franco-Greek Regiments attempted to storm Zborsko but were pushed back in the ensuing counterattack, as powerful pockets of resistance between the Sousnitsa and Bigrut streams facilitated its defense. Greek units then focused on Sousnitsa the fall of which created an opening in the Bulgarian rear and put the surrounding units to flight. Using dispersed bluffs as cover, soldiers of the Shumadia Division took over Veternik, Kamene and the western part of a nearby mountain range with considerable difficulty. Elements of the same unit successfully flanked Kravitski Kamene while the 17th Division was engaging in a frontal assault. At 16:00 pm, the Serbian 1st Army's thrust on Sokol failed to produce intended results. An attack later that night did secure the peak. The two French divisions were then ordered to remain in position while the Serbian Timok and Yugoslav Divisions moved forward. By the end of the day, Bulgaria lost approximately 40–50 percent of the 12,000 soldiers involved in the battle, including 3,000 prisoners of war, 2,689 dead and 50 out of the initial 158 artillery pieces. Entente casualties amounted to 1,700 Frenchmen and 200 Serbians killed in action.

On the morning of 16 September, the Serbians overran the Kozjak mountain range and the Golo Bilo peak. They were joined by the 35th Greek Regiment which crossed the Poroi river and later marching on Topolets. At 11:00 am, Franco-Hellenic units stormed Zborsko for a second time and were met by heavy artillery and machine gun fire. The attack was rebuffed with the loss of 158 Greeks and roughly the same number of French lives and attempts to take the area were suspended. Živojin Mišić's 1st Army and the Armée d'Orient performed a night attack on the Gradešnica fortified zone, suppressing the defenders. The 1st Division Group moved into a position on the Poroi river north of Brahovo in conjunction with the Timok Division. By the night of 16 September, the gap in what formerly constituted the front-line had extended to 25 kilometres (16 mi) in width and 7 kilometres (4.3 mi) in depth. The Allied command ordered its air department to continue attacking all bridges on the river Vardar.

At 4.00 a.m. on 17 September, Hellenic components of the 1st Division Group raided mount Preslap, a key position housing Bulgarian artillery. The Greeks rapidly descended from Golo Bilo and then began climbing the cliffs of Preslap with their bare hands. The Preslap garrison proceeded to abandon their positions and retreat eastwards. Having lost their artillery cover forces at Zborsko followed their comrades in retreat. The Timok Division conquered Topolets and advanced towards Studena Voda and Preslap while the Morava and Yugoslav Divisions overran Koutskov Kamene. At the same time, the Drina and Danube Divisions seized Gradešnica along with the Poltsista and Besistsa peaks, then halted at Melinitsa.

On 18 September, the 11th French Colonial Division and the 6th Greek Regiment occupied the villages of Zovik, Staravina and Cebren, approaching towards the Cebren Monastery bridge on Crna. An Entente air raid destroyed another bridge north of Razim Bey. Bulgarian forces failed at putting a stop to the Allied offensive, abandoning their wounded and large quantities of military equipment. By the end of the day, Allied troops had advanced 15 kilometres (9.3 mi) into enemy territory while also seizing locales of strategic importance that would later enable them to continue pushing deeper into Vardar Macedonia.

=== Battle of Doiran ===
On 16 September, the Allies commenced a 232 gun and 24 howitzer artillery barrage on the Bulgarian positions between Vardar and Doiran. Bulgaria responded in kind, with the artillery duel continuing during the following two days. On the night of 17–18 September, Bulgarian positions were targeted by nine salvos of gas shells, however the attack failed to produce any considerable effect due to the recent arrival of new gas masks and chemical defense training.

At 5.00 a.m. on 18 September, the British XII Corps executed a pincer maneuver on the 9th Bulgarian Division, while the Greek Serres Division and the 83rd British Brigade assaulted the Bulgarian trenches to the west, taking numerous prisoners. On the north–east direction the Crete Division and the 28th British Division advanced between the lake and Belasica, after clearing out the Bulgarian outpost line. The 26th British Division seized a number of Bulgarian security outposts but was quickly repulsed by heavy artillery fire and counter-attacks that recaptured the lost ground. It was not until 7:20 am, when the Serres Division managed to make limited gains on the flanks having suffered numerous casualties and lost momentum. In the meantime the 22nd British Division overtook two central trenchlines. Supported by concentrated artillery and machine gun fire the 3rd Bulgarian Brigade pushed the Allies back, by the end of the day the sum of the Entente forces were back at their starting point, the British 67th Brigade having lost 65 percent of its soldiers.

The offensive was resumed at 4.00 a.m. on 19 September after a night of heavy shelling. The operation involved the British 77th and 65th Brigades, the French 2/2nd Zouaves regiment. along with the Serres and 14th Greek Divisions. Following five hours of intense fighting the Allies managed to overrun the town of Dojran, Kala Tepe mountain, and Teton Hill, with the Pip Ridge and Dub mountain remaining in Bulgarian hands. In the aftermath of the engagement the Allied command found itself to be unable to make any further offensive operations on the Doiran sector as it no longer possessed an adequate reserve of manpower. Bulgaria lost a total of 518 dead, 998 wounded, and 1,210 captured. Greek casualties amounted to 503 killed, 2,286 injured and 615 missing, with the British suffering 3,871 dead and wounded.

=== Subsequent operations ===
On 20 September, the 17th and 122nd French Colonial Divisions along with the 1st Serbian Army crossed the river Crna. News of a breakthrough at Dobro Pole prompted the defenders of Doiran to abandon their positions and rush to the defense of their homeland, in order to prevent a future occupation by the Entente. On 21 September, the Allies became aware of the Bulgarian withdrawal after observing a series of fires and munition dump explosions on the Bulgarian positions, a pursuit by the British XII Corps was launched immediately. The Serbian advanced guard approached Krivolak, thus creating a wedge between the 1st Bulgarian and 11th German Armies in an effort to force the latter to retire towards Albania. The 2nd Bulgarian Army headed towards the Kosturino Pass avoiding direct engagement with the Allies.

At 17:30 p.m. on 22 September, the Italian 35th Division under General Ernesto Mombelli joined the offensive, seizing Hill 1050 stronghold from the 302nd German Division and taking 150 prisoners. Fighting took place in Kanatlarci and along the Monastir–Prilep road, in Cepik, Kalabak and Topolčani as the Allies continued to advance towards Prilep. At 14:00 p.m. on 23 September, General Louis Franchet d'Espèrey announced that the initial plan of the operation was to be modified. The Italians were ordered to strike Kičevo with the aim of preventing the enemy forces stationed at Monastir from reaching the railroad hub in Uskub, the 11th Colonial French Division was instead tasked with securing Prilep. Half an hour later the French entered Prilep, to the east Franco–Serbian columns marched on Štip, Veles, Brod and through the Peristeri mountain range.

On 24 September, Bulgarian infantry supported by artillery halted the advance of the Italian cavalry between Kruševo and the Buchin bridge. At 17:00 pm, an Italo–Serbian assault resulted in the fall of Stepanci. On 25 September, the Sicilia Brigade captured Kruševo and the surrounding peaks after being reinforced by the 11th Colonial French Division. The Quadruple Alliance High Command set Uskub as the rallying point for its forces in Vardar Macedonia, intending to later strengthen them with units from Germany and Austria. The 30th and 156th French Divisions occupied Prevaletz and Drvenik respectively. On 25 September, a band of Bulgarian deserters who had previously fled from Dobro Pole arrived at Kyustendil, looting the city and putting the Bulgarian High Command to flight. The mass of retreating Bulgarian mutineers then converged on the railway center of Radomir in Bulgaria, just 48 kilometres (30 mi) from the capital city of Sofia. On the evening of 26 September, Italian cavalry wrestled Goloznica from a Saxon infantry unit, later entering Drenovo where it received information of a Bulgarian withdrawal from Veles. On 27 September, the leaders of the Bulgarian Agrarian National Union took control of these troops and proclaimed the establishment of the Bulgarian Republic. About 4,000–5,000 rebellious troops threatened Sofia the following day, in what came to be known the Radomir Rebellion.

The Serbian Second Army having previously taken Štip, entered Veles, Kochana and Grlena. Uskub was protected by a garrison of six and a half battalions, four armored trains and four artillery batteries split between a mountain range south of the city and a position north of lake Kaplan. Between 27–28 September, the 1st and 4th French Colonial Regiments made their way through Drachevo and Pagaruza, successfully bypassing any sentries located in the 20-kilometre (12 mi) gap between the two Bulgarian formations that protected Uskub. At 4:00 a.m. on 29 September, French General François Léon Jouinot-Gambetta laid out the plan for the final stage of the offensive, the attack on Uskub. The assault was launched an hour later, French spahi utilized thick fog to advance on mount Vodna, however they were forced to regroup after facing heavy resistance. A pincer movement by the 1st Colonial Regiment created a bridgehead at river Vardar, while the 4th Colonial Regiment seized Lisici village. At 9:00 am, the spahis overtook Vodna, later shifting their attention towards the Kalkandelen road. The 1st Colonial Regiment joined the spahis, opening machine gun fire on the retreating 61st German Corps and causing numerous casualties. At 11:00 am, the French entered Uskub, detaining 220 Bulgarian and 139 German soldiers, while also seizing 5 guns and large amounts of ordnance.

== Aftermath ==
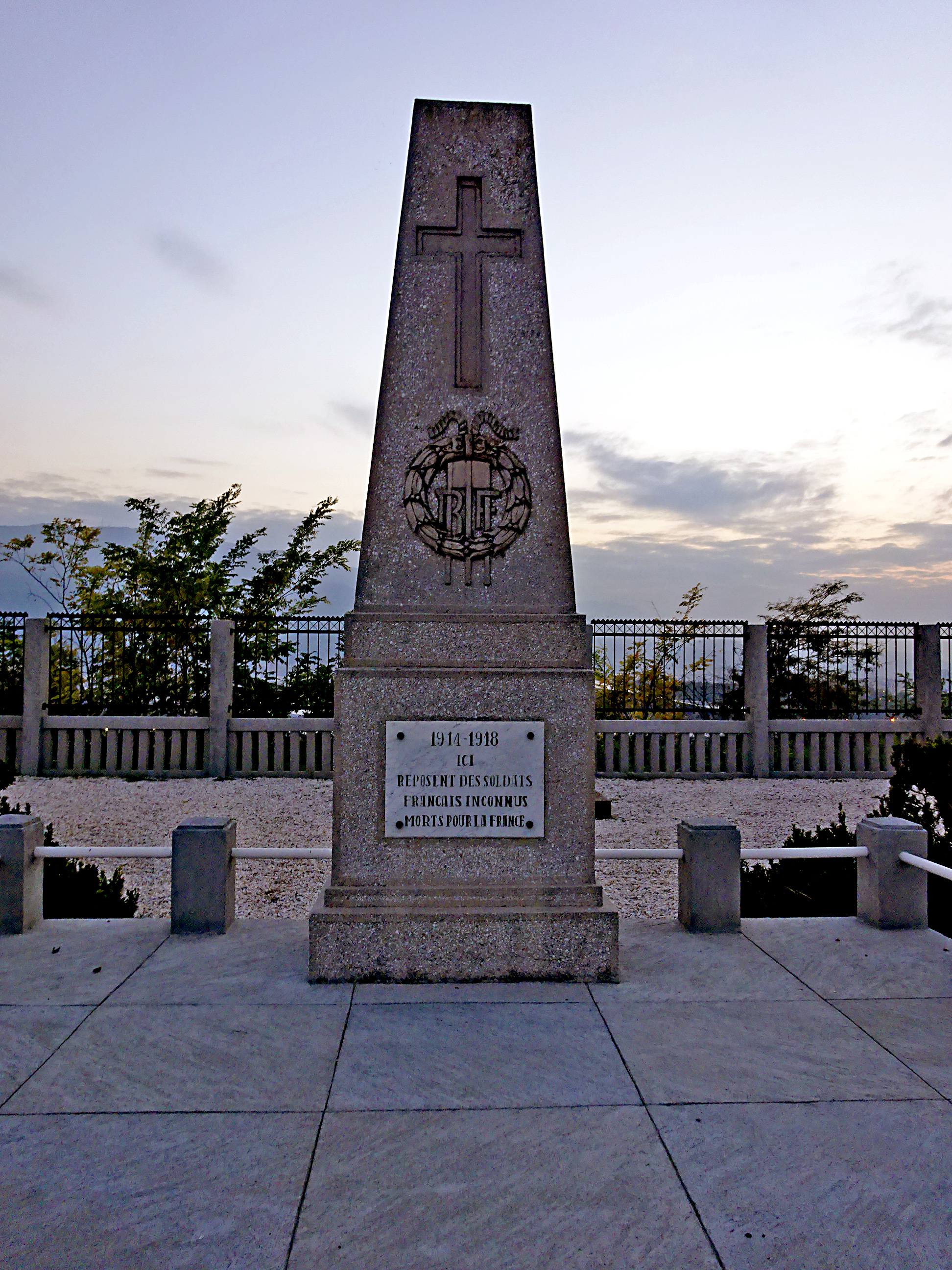
French military cemetery in Skopje

Under those chaotic circumstances a Bulgarian delegation arrived in Thessaloniki to ask for an armistice. On 29 September, the Bulgarians were granted the Armistice of Salonica by General d'Esperey. The Bulgarian downfall turned the strategic and operational balance of the war against the Central Powers. The Macedonian Front was brought to an end at noon on 30 September, when the ceasefire came into effect. The treaty included the full capitulation of the 11th German Army, bringing the final tally of German and Bulgarian prisoners to 77,000 and granting the Allies 500 artillery pieces. The Radomir Rebellion was put down, by Bulgarian forces, as of 2 October, while Tsar Ferdinand I of Bulgaria abdicated and went into exile the following day.

New balance was best described by German Emperor Wilhelm II in his telegram to Bulgarian Tsar Ferdinand I: "Disgraceful! 62,000 Serbs decided the war!". On 29 September 1918, the German Supreme Army Command informed Kaiser Wilhelm II and the Imperial Chancellor Count Georg von Hertling, that the military situation facing Germany was hopeless.

The British and Greek Armies headed east towards the European side of the Ottoman Empire, while the French and Serbian forces continued north. The British Army neared Constantinople and, without a force capable of stopping the advance, the Ottoman government asked for an armistice (the Armistice of Mudros) on 26 October. In Serbia, "Desperate Frankie" (as the British nicknamed d'Esperey) continued to advance and the Serbo-French Army re-captured the country, overrunning several weak German divisions that tried to block its push near Niš. On 3 November, Austria-Hungary was forced to sign an armistice on the Italian Front ending the war there. On 10 November, d'Esperey's army crossed the Danube river and was poised to enter the Hungarian heartland. At the request of the French general, Count Mihály Károlyi, leading the Hungarian government, came to Belgrade and signed another armistice.

== See also ==
- Treaty of Neuilly-sur-Seine
- Kingdom of Yugoslavia
