= Independent Division (Greece) =

Independent Division Ἀνεξάρτητος Μεραρχία
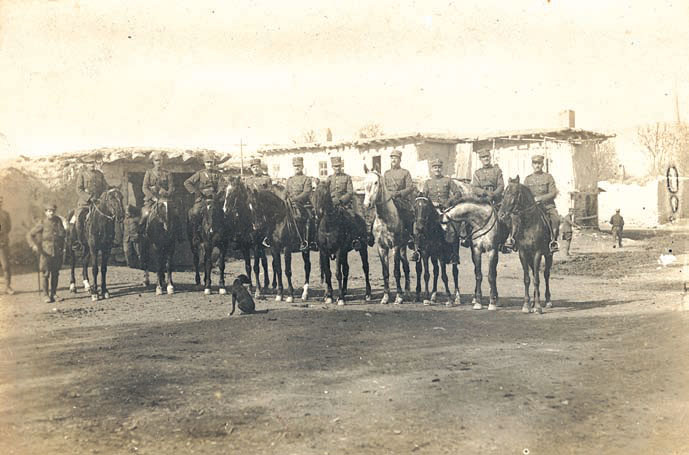
- The divisional staff at Muttalip, Eskişehir
- Active: 1921–1922
- Country: Kingdom of Greece
- Branch: Hellenic Army
- Type: Infantry
- Size: Division
- Engagements: Greco-Turkish War (1919–1922): Battle of Seyitgazi, Battle of Dumlupinar, Great Offensive

The Independent Division (Greek: Ἀνεξάρτητος Μεραρχία, romanized: Anexartitos Merarchia) was an infantry division of the Greek Army during the Greco-Turkish War of 1919–1922.

Originally formed in July 1921 in Eastern Thrace under Major General Georgios Leonardopoulos to take part in the envisaged, but never realized, occupation of Constantinople, it was transferred to the front in Asia Minor in August. The division captured the town of Seyitgazi in September, and remained there in defensive positions until the Turkish offensive in August 1922. The collapse of the Army of Asia Minor's front and the subsequent Turkish advance left the division, now commanded by Colonel Dimitrios Theotokis, effectively cut off behind enemy lines. Nevertheless, the division managed to cross Asia Minor in order and intact, giving battle with the Turkish forces and taking under its protection some 8,000 Greek and Armenian civilians in the process. After a march of over 600 kilometres (370 mi), it reached the Aegean coast at Dikili, and boarded ships for Lesbos. The last units of the division left Asia Minor in the early hours of 14 September [O.S. 1 September] 1922. The division was then shipped back to Thrace, where it was amalgamated with the remnants of the 12th Infantry Division into a new 12th Division, as part of the Army of the Evros.

== Sources ==
- Ambelas, Dimitrios T. (1997) [1937]. Ανεξάρτητος Μεραρχία - Η Κάθοδος των νεωτέρων Μυρίων, 16-31 Αυγούστου 1922 [The Independent Division - The March of the Modern Ten Thousand, 16–31 August 1922] (in Greek) (Third ed.). Athens: Tourikis Editions. ISBN 960-85554-6-9.
- Ἐπίτομος ἱστορία τῆς εἰς Μικράν Ἀσίαν Ἐκστρατείας 1919-1922 [Concise History of the Campaign in Asia Minor 1919–1922] (in Greek). Athens: Hellenic Army History Directorate. 1967.
- Mountouris, Dimitrios (1928). Ἡ ἀνεξάρτητος μεραρχία (Δ. Θεοτόκη): Ἥτοι συγκρότησις καὶ δράσις αὐτῆς ἐν Μικρᾷ Ασίᾳ [The Independent Division (D. Theotokis'): Viz, its Formation and Action in Asia Minor] (in Greek). Lamia: Konstantinos Mavroeidis Pub.
