= Liaison of Independent Anti-Venizelists =

The Liaison of Independent Anti-Venizelists was a political party in Greece in the 1920s.

== History ==
The party first contested national elections in 1926, when they won a single seat in the parliamentary elections with 0.6% of the national vote. However, the party did not contest any further elections.
