= United Electoral Front of Workers, Farmers and Refugees =

Former Greek political party

The United Electoral Front of Workers, Farmers and Refugees (Greek: Ενιαίο Μέτωπο Εργατών, Αγροτών και Προσφύγων, ΕΜΕΑ; EMEA) was a political party in Greece.

== History ==
The party first contested national elections in 1926, when they won ten seats in the parliamentary elections, becoming the fifth-largest faction in the Hellenic Parliament. Despite their success in 1926, the party did not contest the 1928 elections, subsequently disappearing.

== Election results ==
=== Hellenic Parliament ===
Election	Leader	Votes	%	Seats	Rank	Status
1926	Collective leadership	41,982	4.4	10 / 286	5th	Opposition
