= Provincial Party =

The Provincial Party (Greek: Επαρχιακό Κόμμα) was a political party in Greece in the 1920s.

== History ==
The party first contested national elections in 1926, when they won two seats in the parliamentary elections with 1% of the national vote. However, the party did not contest any further national elections.
