= Party of Independents and Refugees =

Defunct Greek political party

The Party of Independents and Refugees (Greek: Κόμμα Ανεξάρτητων και Προσφύγων) was a political party in Greece in the 1920s.

== History ==
The party first contested national elections in 1926, when they won two seats in the parliamentary elections with 1.8% of the national vote. However, the party did not contest any further elections.
