= Democratic Liberals (Greece) =

The Democratic Liberals or Party of Democratic Liberals (Greek: Κόμμα Δημοκρατικών Φιλελεύθερων) was the name of two political groups in Greece in the 1920s.

== History ==
The "Democratic Liberals" were a group within the Liberal Party who supported Greece becoming a republic. The group was formed during the campaign period of the 1923 elections where the change from a constitutional monarchy to a republic was the dominant issue. Disagreeing with the party leadership, which advocated changing the constitution in due course after a referendum on the matter, the Democratic Liberals led by George Roussos sided with the position of the Democratic Union, which called for an immediate change of the constitution before a referendum was held. Running on a joint platform, the Democratic Liberals–Democratic Union alliance won 120 of the 398 seats in parliament.

The second group contested the 1926 parliamentary elections, running only in the Lesbos constituency, where they received 29% of the vote and won three of the eight seats allocated to the constituency, which were taken by Stylianos Kritikos, Maliakas Lailios and Byron Karapanagiotis. The groups did not contest any further elections.
