= Co-operation Agricultural Party =

The Co-operation Agricultural Party (Greek: Συνεργαστικόν Αγροτικόν Κόμμα) was a political party in Greece in the 1920s.

== History ==
The party first contested national elections in 1926, when they won three seats in the parliamentary elections with 0.9% of the national vote. However, the party did not contest any further elections.
