= National Believers Popular Party =

The National Believers Popular Party (Greek: Κόμμα Εθνικοφρόνων Λαϊκών) was a political party in Greece in the 1920s.

== History ==
The party first contested national elections in 1926, when they won a single seat in the parliamentary elections with 0.5% of the national vote. However, the party did not contest any further elections.
