= Macedonian OMAS Liaison =

The Macedonian OMAS Liaison was a political party in Greece in the 1920s.

== History ==
The party first contested national elections in 1926, when they won two seats in the parliamentary elections with 0.5% of the national vote. However, the party did not contest any further elections.
