= Democratic Union (Greece) =

Greek political party

The Democratic Union (Greek: Δημοκρατική Ένωση) or Democratic Union Party (Greek: Κόμμα Δημοκρατικής Ενώσεως) was a political party in Greece, founded by the prominent liberal and republican politician Alexandros Papanastasiou.

== History ==
The party first contested national elections in 1923, when it ran on a joint platform with the Democratic Liberals faction of the Liberal Party, winning 120 seats and becoming the second-largest faction after the ruling Liberal Party. The party ran alone in the 1926 parliamentary elections, receiving 6.5% of the vote and winning 17 seats, making it the fourth-largest party in the Hellenic Parliament.

In 1929, the party was renamed the Agricultural and Labour Party.
