= Panagiotis Gargalidis =

Greek Army general (c. 1870–1942)

Major General Panagiotis Gargalidis
- Παναγιώτης Γαργαλίδης
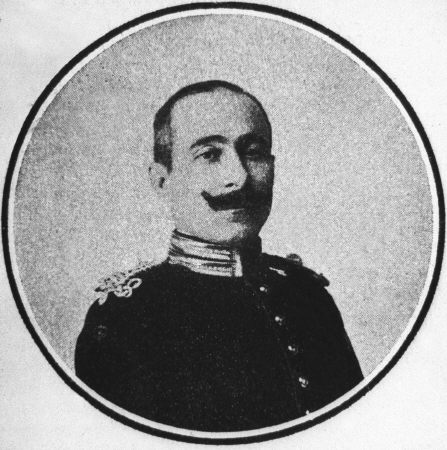
- Gargalidis c. 1914
- Born: c. 1870; Messini, Kingdom of Greece
- Died: 1942; Kalamata, Hellenic State
- Military career
- Allegiance: Kingdom of Greece
- Branch: Hellenic Army
- Rank: Major General
- Commands: 35th Infantry Regiment; 11th Infantry Division; III Army Corps
- Conflicts: Greco-Turkish War (1897); Balkan Wars; First Balkan War; Second Balkan War; World War I; Macedonian Front; Vardar Offensive; Russia Civil War; Allied intervention in the Russian Civil War; Southern Front; Southern Russia Intervention; Greco-Turkish War (1919-1922); 11 September 1922 Revolution; Leonardopoulos-Gargalidis coup d'état attempt
- Awards: Croix de Guerre

Panagiotis Gargalidis (Greek: Παναγιώτης Γαργαλίδης; c. 1870–1942) was a Hellenic Army general who fought in the Greco-Turkish War of 1897, the Balkan Wars, World War I, and the Asia Minor Campaign, and leader of a failed coup attempt in 1923.

== Life ==
He was born in Messini in about 1870, and entered military service after studies in the Hellenic Army's NCO School. He fought in the Greco-Turkish War of 1897 as a subaltern, and in the Balkan Wars as an officer. He particularly distinguished himself during the latter in the battles of Nigrita and Ogniar Mahalla.

During World War I he was commander of the 35th Infantry Regiment on the Macedonian front. In the September 1918 Vardar Offensive of the Allies, he led his regiment to the capture of Mount Preslap, for which he was mentioned in dispatches by the Allied commander-in-chief Louis Franchet d'Espèrey, and received the Croix de Guerre with a gilt star.

In the subsequent Allied intervention in the Russian Civil War, he participated in the Greek expeditionary corps in the Crimea in 1919. In 1920 he was sent to the front in Asia Minor, where he took over command of the 11th Infantry Division. Following the Greek defeat in August 1922, he joined the 11 September 1922 Revolution and, promoted to Major General, assumed command of the III Army Corps in the Army of Thrace.

On 22 October 1923, along with major general Georgios Leonardopoulos, and the support of royalist officers, he launched the failed Leonardopoulos–Gargalidis coup d'état attempt. He was captured by loyalist forces near Mount Kithairon, and condemned to degradation and death by a field military tribunal on 15 November, along with Leonardopoulos and the colonels Avrampos and Nikolareas. Following various appeals, including by Pope Pius XI, for clemency, the sentence was commuted; Gargalidis was amnestied and removed from the army. In 1935, with the restoration of the monarchy, he was rehabilitated and his rank was restored.

He died in 1942 in Kalamata.

== Sources ==
- Papyros Larousse Britannica Encyclopaedia, Vol. 16, p. 193.
- Modern Encyclopaedic Dictionary "Helios", Vol. 5, p. 26.
- Vratsanos, Dimos, Η Ιστορία Των Ελληνικών Επαναστάσεων 1824-1935, p. 213.
