= Georgios Leonardopoulos =

Greek army major general (1867–1936)

Major General Georgios Leonardopoulos
- Γεώργιος Λεοναρδόπουλος
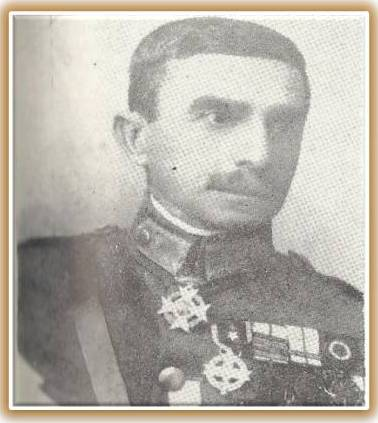
- Leonardopoulos in 1922
- Born: 1867; Corinth, Kingdom of Greece
- Died: 1936 (aged 68–69); Athens, Kingdom of Greece
- Education: Hellenic Army Academy
- Military career
- Allegiance: Kingdom of Greece
- Branch: Hellenic Army
- Service years: 1884–1923; 1935–1936
- Rank: Major General
- Commands: 9th Infantry Division; 10th Infantry Division; Independent Division; IV Army Corps; V Army Corps
- Conflicts: Greco-Turkish War (1897); Balkan Wars; First Balkan War (WIA); Second Balkan War; World War I; Macedonian Front; Greco-Turkish War of 1919–1922; Second Battle of İnönü; Battle of the Sakarya; 11 September 1922 Revolution; Leonardopoulos–Gargalidis coup attempt
- Awards: Commander of the Order of the Redeemer; Cross of Valour (Greece); War Cross; Medal of Military Merit; Croix de Guerre

Georgios Leonardopoulos (Greek: Γεώργιος Λεοναρδόπουλος; 1867–1936) was a Greek army major general who fought in the Greco-Turkish War of 1897, the Balkan Wars, World War I, and the Greco-Turkish War of 1919–1922, and led a failed coup attempt in 1923.

== Life ==
He was born in Corinth in 1867, and entered the Hellenic Army Academy in 1884, graduating in 1889 as an Engineers Second Lieutenant. He quickly earned a reputation as a good and industrious officer. He fought in the Greco-Turkish War of 1897, and after promotion to Lieutenant was appointed to teach architecture at the Army academy from 1902 to 1907.

=== Balkan Wars ===
During the First Balkan War in 1912–1913 he commanded a bridge-laying company, and was wounded in battle. Subsequently, he was posted to the General Headquarters as Director of Engineers. During the Second Balkan War against Bulgaria, he served as chief of engineers in the 3rd Infantry Division. After the end of the war, he served in the commission that drew the border between Greece and the Kingdom of Serbia.

=== World War I ===
Leonardopoulos was then appointed as chief of staff of the 8th Infantry Division in 1915–1916, before joining the Provisional Government of National Defence of Eleftherios Venizelos in September 1916. There he was appointed chief of staff of the National Defence army corps and then head of the personnel office in the Provisional Government's Ministry of Military Affairs. After the country was reunified under Venizelos' leadership in June 1917, he became deputy chief of the general staff.

=== Thrace and Asia Minor ===
In 1918 he was assigned as commander of the 9th Infantry Division, which he led during the occupation of Western Thrace and of Eastern Thrace against the Turkish forces of Cafer Tayyar in July 1920. He was then appointed commander of the 10th Infantry Division, which he led during the Second Battle of İnönü in March 1921.

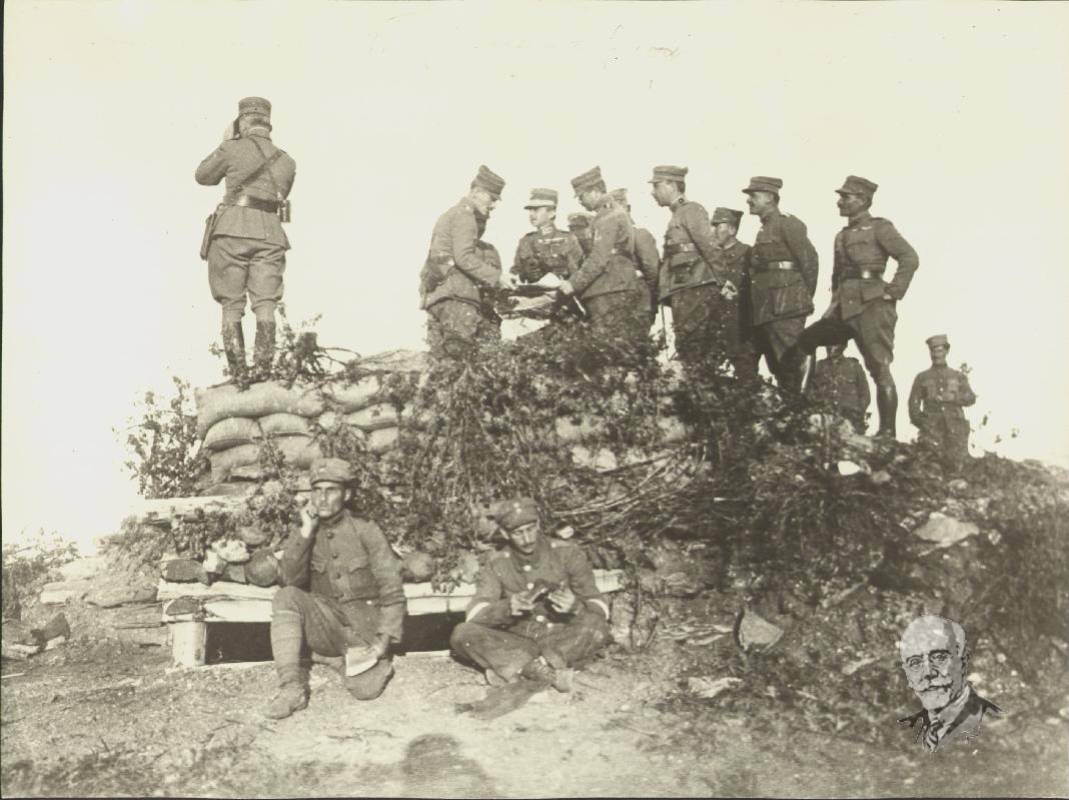
Leonardopoulos (centre, with the gilded visor cap) with his staff in Asia Minor, 1921

Subsequently, he was named commander of the newly formed Independent Division, which he led as a reserve formation during the Battle of Sakarya in 1921. He fell ill and was invalided to Greece.

=== 1922 Revolution and coup attempt ===
After the Greek defeat in Asia Minor in August 1922, he joined the 11 September 1922 Revolution, and was appointed commander of the IV Army Corps and later of the V Army Corps.

In October 1923, however, he changed stance and along with Panagiotis Gargalidis, he led an abortive coup attempt with pro-royalist officers. Defeated and captured, he was condemned to death by the military tribunal. The sentences of the condemned for this affair were commuted, and Leonardopoulos was amnestied after a few months, but dismissed from the army.

In 1935, with the restoration of the monarchy, he was rehabilitated and his rank was restored. He died in 1936.

== Sources ==
- Μεγάλη Στρατιωτική και Ναυτική Εγκυκλοπαιδεία. Τόμος Δ′: Καβάδης – Μωριάς [Great Military and Naval Encyclopedia. Volume IV] (in Greek). Athens. 1929.
