= Conservative Union (Greece) =

Political party in Greece

The Conservative Union (Greek: Κόμμα Συμπράξεως Συντηρητικών) was a political party in Greece in the 1920s.

== History ==
The party first contested national elections in 1926, when they won three seats in the parliamentary elections with 1.3% of the national vote. However, the party did not contest any further elections.
