= 1923 Greek parliamentary election =

- 16 December 1923

All 398 seats in the Hellenic Parliament 199 seats needed for a majority
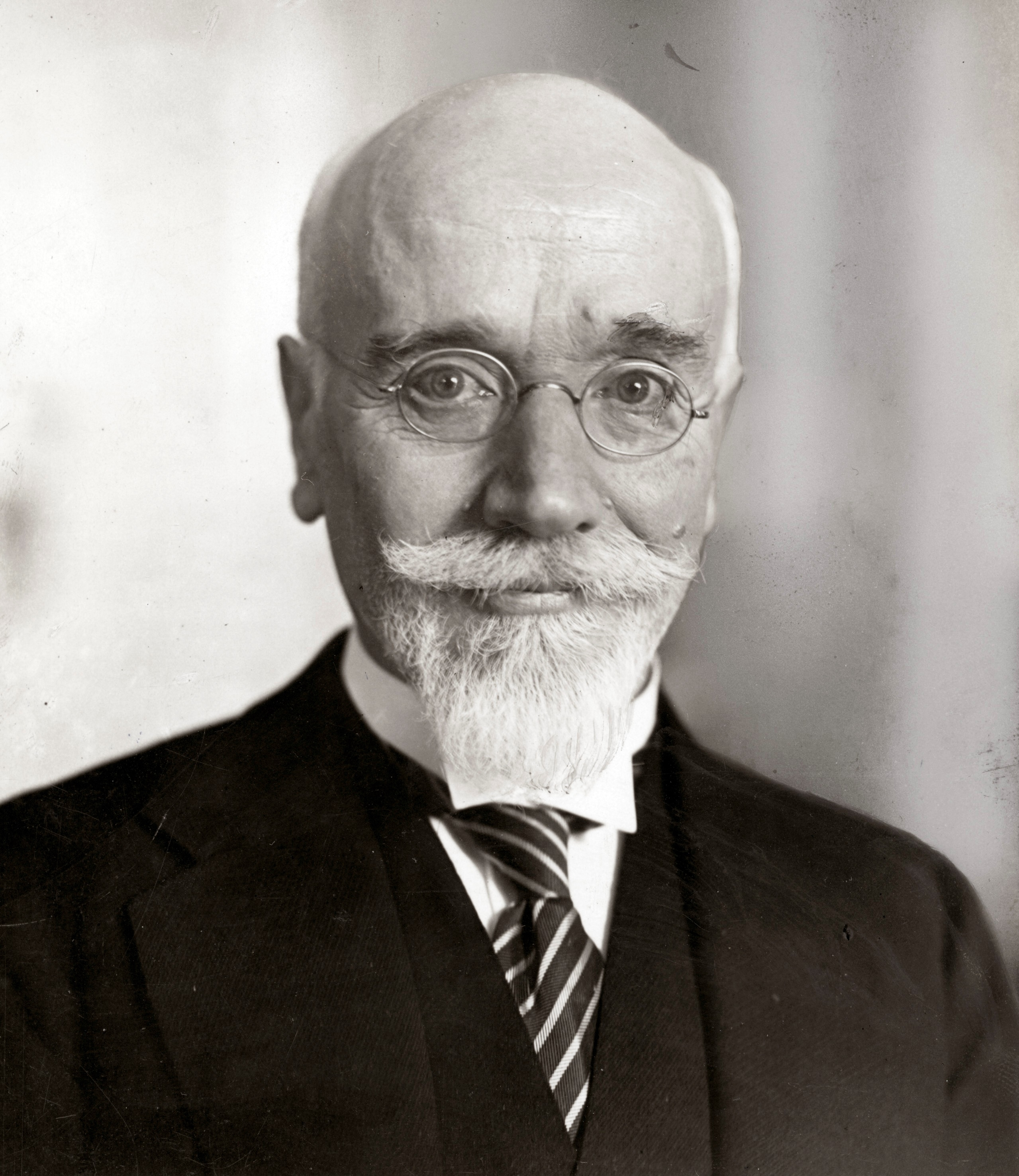

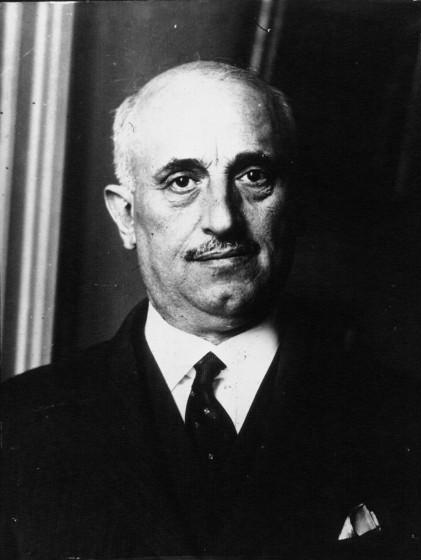
	First party	Second party
Leader	Eleftherios Venizelos	Alexandros Papanastasiou
Party	Liberal	DE–DF
Last election	118 seats	–
Seats won	250	120
Seat change	▲132	New
Prime Minister before election
Stylianos Gonatas
Liberal
Prime Minister after election
Eleftherios Venizelos
Liberal

Parliamentary elections were held in Greece on 16 December 1923. The result was a victory for the Liberal Party, which won 250 of the 398 seats.

== Background ==
After the defeat of the Liberals in 1920, Eleftherios Venizelos left the country, King Constantine I returned and Greece was soundly defeated by the newly reformed Turkey in the war in Anatolia. After the exile of King Constantine, his eldest son George was proclaimed King George II. After the national defeat and the definitive Treaty of Lausanne however, Greece was sorely divided.

== Results ==
Party	Votes	%	Seats
Liberal Party			250
Democratic Union–Democratic Liberals			120
Anti-Venizelists			7
Independent Democrats			7
Agrarian Party			3
Thessaloniki Jews			3
Western Thrace Muslims			3
Socialist Party			1
Independents			1
Total			395
Total votes	694,448	–	
Source: Nohlen & Stöver
