= Centre Union =

Centre Union Ένωσις Κέντρου
- Leader: Georgios Papandreou
- Founded: 1961; 65 years ago
- Dissolved: 1974; 52 years ago
- Merger of: Liberal Party; National Progressive Center Union
- Merged into: Centre Union – New Forces (official successor)
- Succeeded by: Partially (unofficial succession): New Democracy (right-leaning factions); PASOK (left-leaning factions)
- Headquarters: Athens
- Ideology: Venizelism; National liberalism; Factions: Social democracy; Democratic socialism; Republicanism
- Political position: Centre to centre-left

The Centre Union (Greek: Ένωσις Κέντρου (EK), romanized: Énosis Kéntrou) was a major centrist political party in Greece, created in 1961 by Georgios Papandreou.

== History ==
The Centre Union was a political party in Greece in the 1960s which held office from 1963 to 1965 and was nominally in power from 1965 to 1967. The party was centrist, though elements of the far-right and the left also joined. The party fractured following its leader Georgios Papandreou's resignation after a disagreement with King Constantine II who clashed with Papandreou on how to handle the armed forces. Papandreou was succeeded by several shaky governments which relied on the votes of the opposition and defectors from the Centre Union. The turmoil surrounding Papandreou's resignation became known as the 'Apostasy' which led directly to the Greek military junta of 1967-1974.

=== Establishment and goals ===
The Centre Union was founded in September 1961, six weeks before the elections that same year. The forces of the centre consisted of the Liberal Democratic Party (Fileleftheron Dimokratikon Komma), a splinter party from the Liberal Party surrounding Georgios Papandreou, the Liberal Party (Komma Fileleftheron) of Sofoklis Venizelos and the New Political Forces (Nea Politiki Kinisis). These parties appeared in the wake of the 1958 legislative election which resulted in the Liberal Party, under the joint leadership of Venizelos and Papandreou, coming third, having been eclipsed by the socialist United Democratic Left (Eniaa Dimokratiki Aristera). Added on the centre-left were the National Progressive Centre Union (Ethniki Proodeftiki Enosis Kentrou), the Party of Peasants and Workers (Komma Agrotikon kai Ergazomenon) and Ilias Tsirimokos' Democratic Union party (Dimokratiki Enosis). On the right were Stefanos Stefanopoulos’ Popular Social Party (Laikon Koinonikon Komma), a breakaway group from the Greek Rally, and the Party of the Nationally Minded (Komma Ethnikiphronon). Smaller, less influential figures were brought into the fold, namely Stylianos Allamanis and Pafsanias Katsotas. All constituent parts recognised the sole leadership of Georgios Papandreou.

Upon receiving the leadership of the Centre Union, Georgios Papandreou declared his immediate objective to be the reduction of the EDA vote to less than 20% so that the two 'nationally-minded' parties, EK and the ruling National Radical Union (Ethniki Rizospastiki Enosis, ERE), could contest the elections within the framework of democracy.

Of the two major parties, the Centre Union had a more cohesive party structure. It had an official constitution, membership provisions, professional cadres, national conventions, a youth wing and formal procedures for the succession of leaders. However, not a single meeting of the highest authority in the party, the congress, ever took place.

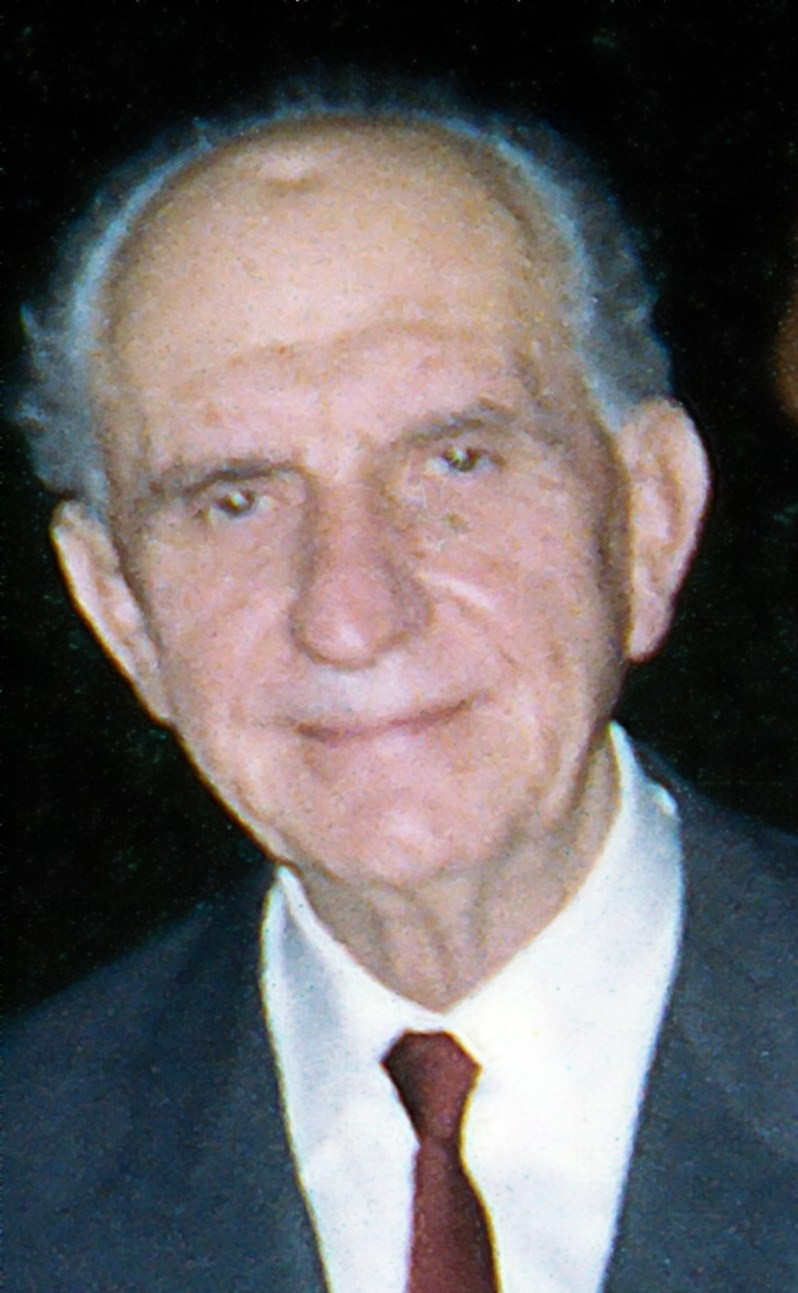
Prime Minister (1963-1965, 1944–1945) and Centre Union leader Georgios Papandreou.

=== The 'Unrelenting Struggle' ===
In anticipation of the next elections, the government of Prime Minister Konstantinos Karamanlis announced intentions of enacting a new electoral law: the proposed law was set before parliament and on 6 May, after lengthy debate, it was passed. A system of 'reinforced' proportional representation was introduced, which gave minor parties a slight advantage in comparison with the previous law.

King Paul, in accordance with political traditions in Greece, appointed a 'service' government headed by the chief of the royal household, General Konstantinos Dovas, to oversee the campaign period to ensure impartial conduct of the election as it was feared that the ruling party may try and tamper with the results.

On 29 September, the results were fully counted: the ERE received 50.8 percent of votes cast, equating to 176 seats; the Centre Union, in collaboration with Spyros Markezinis' Progressive Party, garnered 33.7 percent of the popular vote translating to 100 seats. The majority of the remaining votes went to the left-wing Pandemocratic Agrarian Front of Greece. Immediately, the results were denounced by the extreme left and the Centre Union as illegitimate; Papandreou proclaimed that the results were 'a product of violence and fraud,' thus inaugurating Papandreou's 'unrelenting struggle' for free and fair elections. Meanwhile, several days after the election, deputy leader of the EK, Sofoklis Venizelos, declared that the EK was fighting more than just the ERE, but also 'the General Staff of the Army, the Central Intelligence Agency, the gendarmerie, the National Security Battalions and other dark forces.' General Dovas complained that all of Papandreou's demands prior to the election had been satisfied and pointed out that abstentions had been at a fifteen-year low.

On 2 December, the socialist parties and all but nine Centre Union deputies were absent from the State opening of Parliament in order to protest what they believed to be an illegal administration. Accordingly, on 7 December, without any Centre Union votes, Karamanlis received his vote of confidence by 174 votes to 21. The next stage of the EK's war against the establishment was waged against the king, which involved a boycott of all official functions. Duly, he declined an invitation to a Court Ball celebrating King Paul's sixtieth birthday on 14 December 1961, replying, "Mr Georgios Papandreou will not be attending." Likewise, Sofoklis Venizelos and Spyros Markezinis excused themselves by informing the king that they could not come due to being abroad.

Karamanlis’ position was undermined further when, on 27 May 1963, Grigorios Lambrakis, a left-wing deputy from Piraeus, was murdered by two men wielding clubs in the course of a peaceful protest. The Lambrakis assassination revealed a right-wing underworld when it was revealed the two killers had close links to the local gendarmerie, therefore roping in Karamanlis. While it is unlikely Karamanlis had any ties to the assassination, it placed the idea of an illegal 'para-state' on firmer ground.

The crisis atmosphere was heightened when Karamanlis began having spats with King Paul over a state visit to England that was set to take place in the summer of 1963. Karamanlis, after reaching no agreement with the king regarding the matter, submitted his resignation and suggested that diplomatist and outgoing ERE minister Panagiotis Pipinelis should be entrusted with the premiership and that elections should be held immediately. Paul also favoured Pipinelis because he, unlike Karamanlis, would support the proposed state visit to England. Paul refused immediate elections on the basis that he must not be abroad on the state visit in the midst of an election. Paul then summoned Papandreou and Markezinis who both agreed that a 'service' government enjoying the confidence of parliament should be appointed to prepare the ground for an election, as opposed to Karamanlis' view that elections should be held as soon as possible. Eventually, after five days of consultations, the king called on Pipienlis, who he knew would enjoy the support of all 180 ERE deputies (thus constituting a majority), to form a government. This was not what the Centre Union had bargained for, as Papandreou denounced the new government as "inspiring no confidence in its ability to hold fair elections." The customary confidence vote was therefore boycotted by the Centre Union deputies who all arose from their seats and walked out, except for Sofoklis Venizelos, having promised to cast his vote for the government after two offending ministers were replaced, who informed the teller that he was giving the government a 'vote of tolerance.' He then followed his fellow deputies and walked out.

=== Centre Union in power ===
With the state visit safely behind, Pipinelis demanded and obtained a second confidence vote; shortly thereafter, a new electoral bill was introduced to the chamber providing for another system of 'reinforced' proportional representation. The EK, repudiating the bill, abstained from the final vote and the bill was passed on the votes of the ERE alone. The EK threatened to boycott the upcoming elections if Pipinelis remained in power for the duration of the electoral process. Markezinis also expressed his desire for a change in government, while Karamanlis, communicating from a temporary self-imposed exile in Paris, conveyed his strong desire for Pipinelis to remain in office for the time being. On 26 September, Prime Minister Pipinelis was summoned by King Paul, who handed him the royal decree dissolving Parliament and ordering elections for 3 November. The following day, Pipinelis was replaced by Stelio Mavromichales so as not to agitate the EK's threats.

The legislative election of 3 November 1963 resulted in the Centre Union, carrying the day, albeit narrowly: the Centre Union managed to take 138 out of the 300 seats in parliament with the ERE coming second with 132 seats. The EDA took 28. On 6 November, the king called on Papandreou to form a government. Georgios Papandreou was now prime minister. The Centre Union's victory can largely be credited to the subsiding of anti-Communism, which had flared up in the years following the Civil War and growing unemployment.

Papandreou dispelled any hopes that King Paul initially held that the former himself might seek a coalition with the ERE and announced he would only seek backing from his party and those disaffected with others. By 24 December, however, when he obtained a confidence vote, it turned out he was wrong. The ERE voted solidly against the new government; therefore, Papandreou relied on the votes of his party and the socialist EDA. Despite his party not occupying the majority of seats in Parliament, he still flatly refused any deals with the EDA which he believed to be a front for the illegal Communist Party (KKE). This view was shared by many politicians of the two 'nationally-minded' parties.

Georgios Papandreou headed to the polls again after laying out a vote-catching program before parliament in 1964. The 16 February legislative election yielded a landslide victory for Papandreou. The EK secured 52.7 per cent of the popular vote equating to 171 seats in parliament. The Centre Union were especially large in more prosperous agricultural regions, where the police's grip on power had been much weakened. The EK also attracted lower middle-class voters. The 1964-1965 government, headed by Papandreou, enacted overdue reforms catered towards the lower and middle class by increasing pensions and prices for farmers; the system in which elections take place in the General Confederation of Greek Workers was made fairer. The government put a lot of emphasis on education by abolishing fees for universities and secondary schools; additional university teachers were appointed, a larger intake into universities was accepted, the period of compulsory education was extended to nine years from six, and primary education was to be conducted completely in demotic (common) Greek which was also to have equal status to katharevousa (purified) in secondary schools. New subjects were introduced and more emphasis was put on others; sociology and economics were added to the curriculum subjects while importance was put on modern languages. In total, educational expenditure increased by a third in one year, and by 1967 11.6 per cent of the budget was dedicated to education. Also, although Papandreou viewed the left with some hostility, he released several thousands of prisoners still behind bars from the Civil War. Only about 1000 Communists remained in prison, a large decrease from its peak of about 20,000 in the early 1960s and 50s.

=== The July events ===
The lack of cohesion between EK deputies and the leadership resulted in the collapse of the Centre Union government. A leading cause for the schism in the party was the accusation of nepotism and lust for power on the part of Georgios Papandreou. Andreas Papandreou, the son of Georgios Papandreou, was appointed First Minister of State and Minister of Coordination in 1964, the same year he was elected to Parliament. Rising stars in the party, including future premier Konstantinos Mitsotakis, felt as though the younger Papandreou had not served his time in the party required to garner him the role of what is effectively the assistant prime minister. Disdain of Andreas Papandreou came to a head when, in May 1965, a report written by EK deputies opposed to the Papandreous accused Andreas of collaborating with ASPIDA, a grouping of left-leaning military officers.

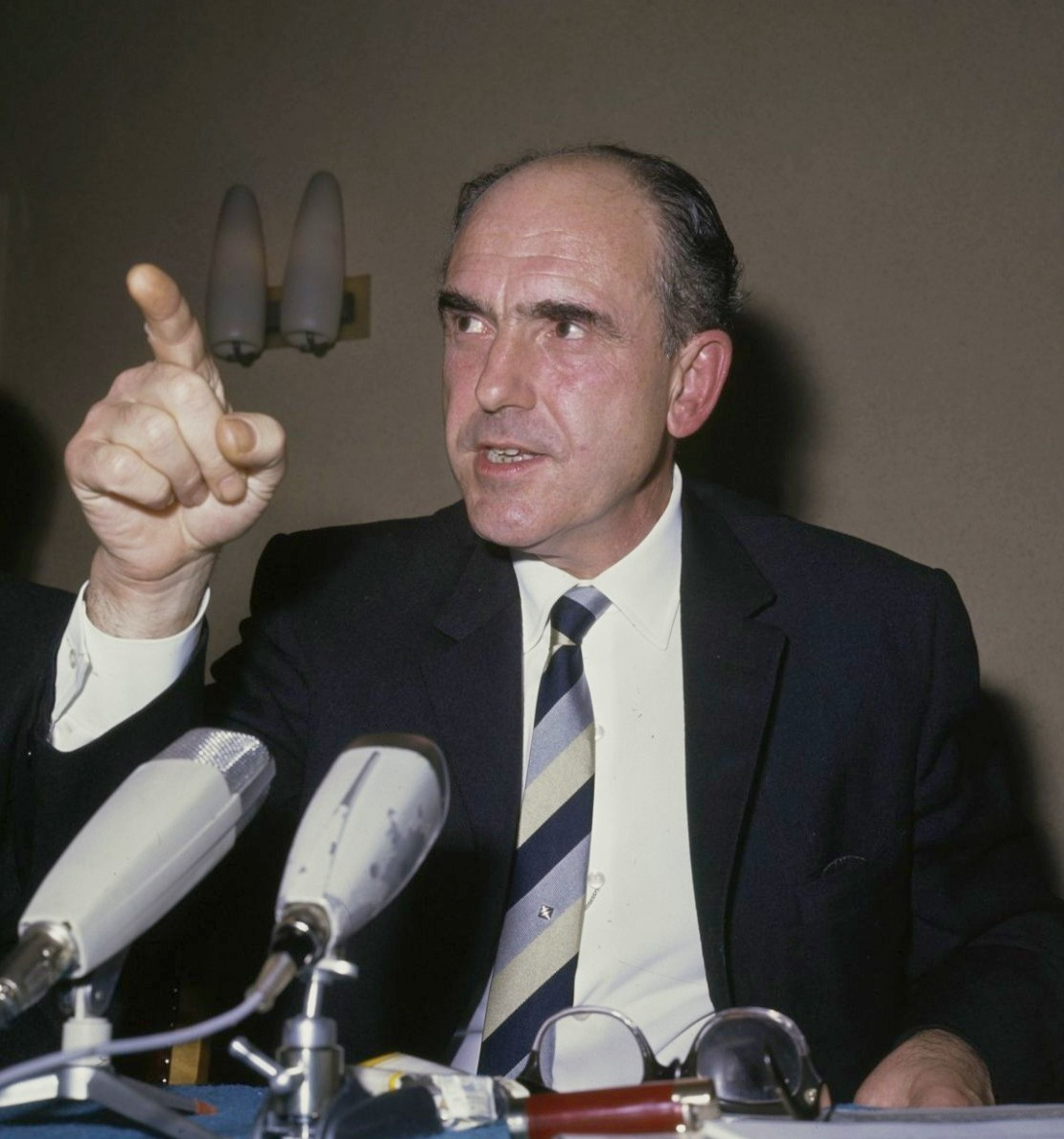
Andreas Papandreou

Papandreou and King Constantine II’s (Paul died in March 1964) relationship began to break down over disagreements on the handling of the armed forces. Petros Garoufalias, a royalist Centre Union deputy, enjoyed the King’s support as Minister of National Defence. In turn, Garoufalias appointed officers loyal to both the King and himself. This was not acceptable to Papandreou, whose primary goal at that point was to purge the armed forces of conspiratorial elements which were vehemently against Papandreou and even more violently against his son holding far more radical views than his aging father. Initially, Papandreou retaliated against politically active officers by moving them as far away as possible from Athens, blocking their promotions or forcing their retirement, but he could only do so much without occupying the Defence Ministry as well as that of Premier. Papandreou, enjoying a healthy parliamentary majority, came to the King and demanded that he be made Defence Minister while holding the Premiership as well which was a prerequisite of replacing the Chief of Staff. The King refused on the grounds that Papandreou’s son Andreas had yet to prove himself innocent in the ASPIDA case. In disgust, Papandreou resigned, kicking off the Iouliana (meaning 'July events', also known as the 'Apostasy' by followers of Papandreou), a stormy political crisis revolving around the resignation of Papandreou.

Immediately after Papandreou's resignation, a new government - headed by EK defectors disaffected with the Papandreous (the 'Apostates'), ERE deputies and 8 deputies belonging to the Progressive Party (all loyal to the standard of Apostate Speaker Georgios Athanasiadis-Novas) - was formed. This government fell in August and was replaced by a new one, headed by Ilias Tsirimokos, which fell a few weeks later in September when it failed to receive the mandatory vote of confidence. Stefanos Stefanopoulos was then appointed and obtained a confidence vote. In total, there were 45 'Apostates.'

The 'Apostasy' had a radicalising effect on the centre-left of the EK. This segment increasingly looked to Andreas Papandreou and, at one point, abandonment from the elected leadership of Georgios Papandreou by the centre-left seemed possible.

An end to the crisis seemed in sight when, on 20 December 1966, Papandreou, ERE leader Panagiotis Kanellopoulos and the king reached a resolution: elections would be held under a straightforward system of proportional representation where all parties participating agreed to compete, and that, in any outcome, the command structure of the army would not be altered. In the leadup to the election scheduled for 28 May 1967, the EK introduced a bill extending parliamentary immunity for the duration of the campaign aimed at protecting Andreas Papandreou, who was still under scrutiny for his potential involvement in ASPIDA; in March 1967, fifteen officers charged with being involved in the ASPIDA affair were convicted. Interim Prime Minister Ioannis Paraskevopoulos resigned in the ensuing row and Kanellopoulos stepped in to fill the role of the Prime Minister until the May election.

Despite the crisis subsiding early on, on 21 April 1967, a month before the scheduled elections, a clique of relatively junior officers headed by Georgios Papadopoulos took over in a coup d'état. Senior officials, including the two Papandreous, were arrested. Georgios Papandreou died on 1 November 1968 and the Centre Union, now illegal, was placed under the titular leadership of Georgios Mavros.

=== Post-junta ===
Mavros reconstituted the Centre Union in 1974 as the Centre Union - New Forces (Enosi Kentrou - Nees Dynameis, EK - ND). The leadership was offered to Andreas Papandreou; however, he declined the offer. Papandreou instead formed the Panhellenic Socialist Movement (Panellinio Sosialistiko Kinima, PASOK) and in the 1977 election, it eclipsed the centrists as the second largest party in parliament. The Centre Union rebranded as the Union of the Democratic Centre (Enosi Dimokratikou Kentrou, EDIK) in 1976, though it failed to re-enter parliament after 1985.

== Electoral history ==
=== Hellenic Parliament elections ===
Hellenic Parliament
Election	Party Leader	Votes	%	Seats	+/–	Position	Government
1961	Georgios Papandreou	1,555,442 (in alliance with PP)	33.66%	100 / 300	▲54	▲2nd	Opposition
1963	Georgios Papandreou	1,962,074	42.04%	138 / 300	▲38	▲1st	Coalition government
1964	Georgios Papandreou	2,424,477	52.7%	171 / 300	▲33	1st	Government

== See also ==
- Democratic Socialist Party of Greece
- Savas Papapolitis
