= 1964 Greek parliamentary election =

- 16 February 1964

All 300 seats in the Hellenic Parliament 151 seats needed for a majority
- Registered: 5,662,965
- Turnout: 81.71% (▼1.44pp)
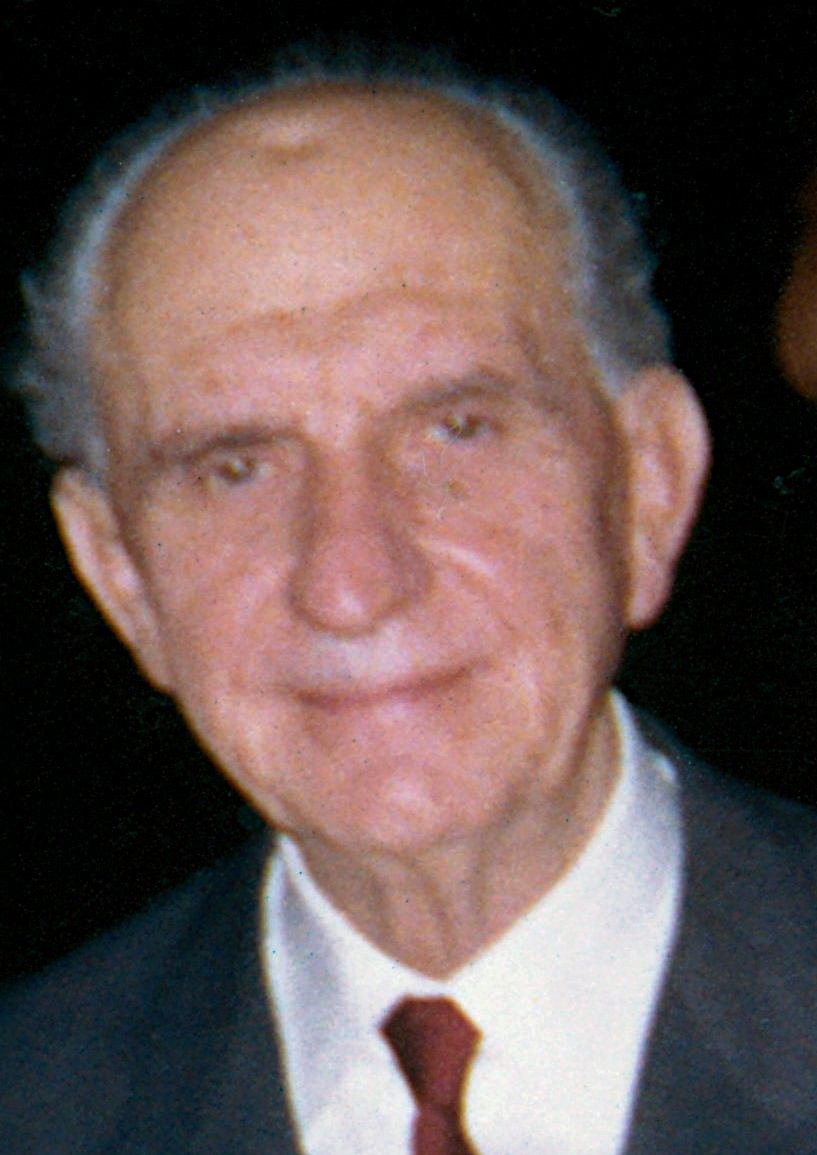

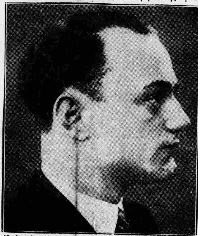

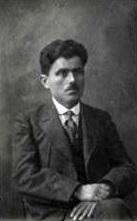
	First party	Second party	Third party
Leader	Georgios Papandreou	Panagiotis Kanellopoulos	Ioannis Passalidis
Party	ΕΚ	ERE	EDA
Last election	42.04%, 138 seats	39.37%, 132 seats	14.34%, 28 seats
Seats won	171	107	22
Seat change	▲33	▼27	▼6
Popular vote	2,424,477	1,621,546	542,865
Percentage	52.72%	35.26%	11.80%
Swing	▲10.68 pp	▼4.11 pp	▼2.54 pp
- Results by constituency
Prime Minister before election
Ioannis Paraskevopoulos
Independent
Prime Minister after election
Georgios Papandreou
ΕΚ

Parliamentary elections were held in Greece on 16 February 1964. They resulted in a clear victory for Georgios Papandreou and his Center Union (EK). Papandreou subsequently formed the 37th government since the end of World War II.

== Background ==
The government led by Panagiotis Kanellopoulos of the National Radical Union (ERE) resigned on 25 September 1963, after which Papandreou formed an interim government on 28 September. As no party had a majority in the Hellenic Parliament, Papandreou's government initiated preparations for elections on 3 November. Although the Center Union emerged as the largest party, which allowed Papandreou to form a new government, it also soon resigned. King Paul accepted Papandreou's resignation on 31 December 1963, and Ioannis Paraskevopoulos formed an interim government to serve until the 1964 elections.

The ERE had been weakened prior to the elections when Konstantinos Karamanlis abandoned politics and exiled himself in Paris. The new ERE leader, Panagiotis Kanellopoulos, formed an alliance with the Progressive Party of Spyros Markezinis.

== Campaign ==
One of the main messages carried by Papandreou was the goal of establishing a "real democracy". On several occasions Papandreou accused Kanellopoulos of copying his political promises, while also arguing that these promises were not consistent with the policies carried out by ERE when they were in power.

A big part of the political discourse between ERE and the Centre Union was in regard to the relations each party had with the left. ERE claimed that Papandreou was supported by EDA, while the Centre Union supporting newspapers accused a number of ERE politicians of being former members of EAM.

On 13 February, during a campaign speech in Athens, Kanellopoulos stated "Mr Papandreou's Democracy is based on the votes of those who seek to overturn freedom... ... Mr Papandreou is not an active comrade of EDA, but he has allowed EDA to consider him their comrade", while also stating that there were only two worlds, democracy and totalitarianism.

In a campaign speech in front of what the press called an "endless crowd of people", Papandreou stated "Democracy has won. Long live Democracy... this election isn't just about a choice between two parties. It's about a choice between two worlds. The world of decay and the world of regeneration The ERE government lead us to a right wing totalitarianism. It wasn't a democracy, it was a corrupted, party based, totalitarian police state. There was only a democracy "facade"... we fought... and democracy was restored in its ancient birthplace."

The EDA claimed that during Papandreou's brief time as prime minister, he kept the "right wing establishment" intact. The EDA's proposals included the legalization of the Communist Party of Greece, the release of political prisoners and the official recognition of the Greek resistance.

== Results ==
These elections marked the first time Andreas Papandreou stood as a candidate, amassing the largest number of votes and taking the position of Minister to the First Ministry of State.

Party	Votes	%	Seats	+/–
Centre Union	2,424,477	52.72	171	+33
National Radical Union-Progressive Party	1,621,546	35.26	107	–27
United Democratic Left	542,865	11.80	22	–6
List of Independents	9,951	0.22	0	0
Total	4,598,839	100.00	300	0
Valid votes	4,598,839	99.39		
Invalid/blank votes	28,151	0.61		
Total votes	4,626,990	100.00		
Registered voters/turnout	5,662,965	81.71		
Source: Nohlen & Stöver

== Aftermath ==
After the results were announced, Papandreou stated "the election results have vindicated our ambitions" while Kanellopoulos conceded, stating "The Greek people have assigned ERE with the role of the opposition, their will is venerable". Shortly after the elections, Papandreou formed his first solid government, which would last till 1965. However, in 1965 the Iouliana crisis, a confrontation between Papandreou and King Constantine II, caused the government to fall. It was replaced by a series of weak governments, comprising centrist defectors and supported by the National Radical Union and Constantine. This eventually led to a military dictatorship starting in 1967, which exploited the endless political unrest.
