= 1963 Greek parliamentary election =

- 3 November 1963

All 300 seats in the Hellenic Parliament 151 seats needed for a majority
- Registered: 5,662,965
- Turnout: 83.15% (▲1.55pp)
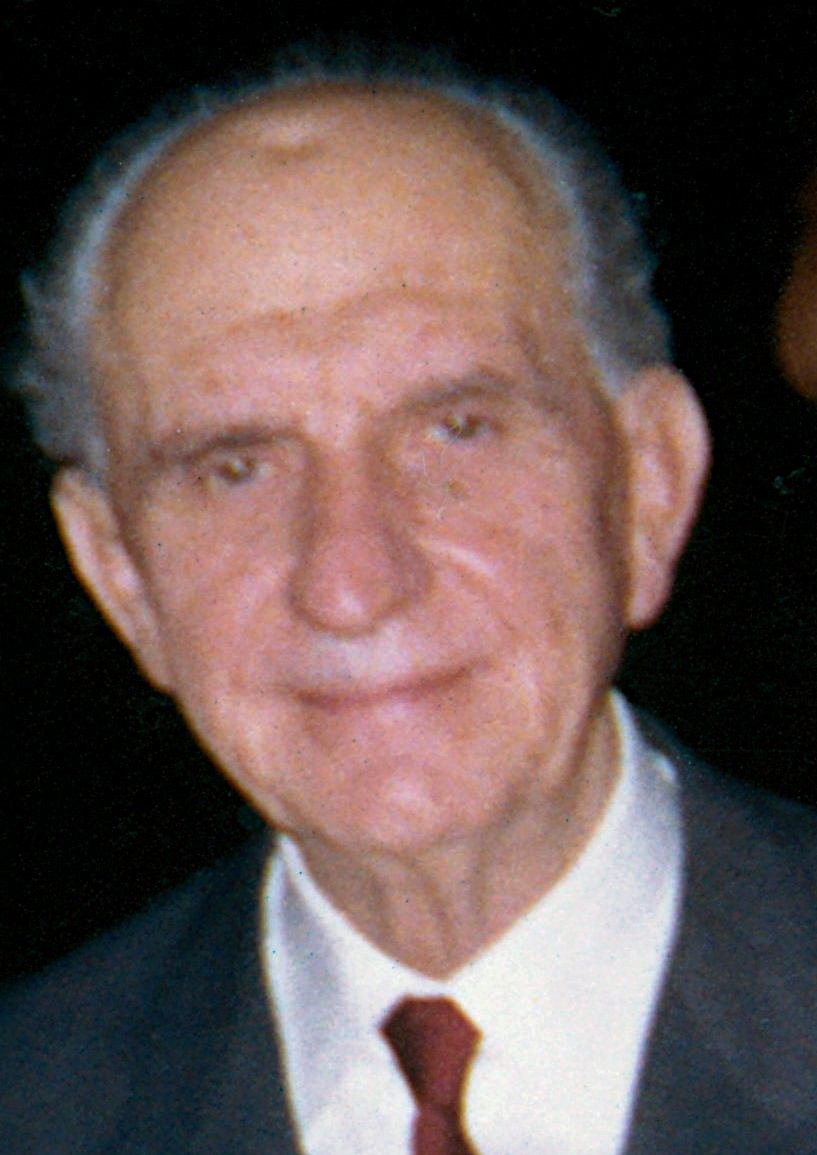

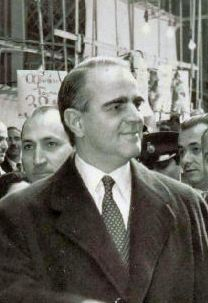

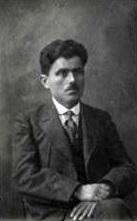
	First party	Second party	Third party
Leader	Georgios Papandreou	Konstantinos Karamanlis	Ioannis Passalidis
Party	ΕΚ	ERE	EDA
Last election	86 seats	176 seats	22 seats
Seats won	138	132	28
Seat change	▲52	▼44	▲6
Popular vote	1,962,074	1,837,377	669,267
Percentage	42.04%	39.37%	14.34%
Prime Minister before election
Konstantinos Karamanlis
ERE
Prime Minister after election
Georgios Papandreou
ΕΚ

Parliamentary elections were held in Greece on 3 November 1963. They resulted in a narrow victory for the Center Union of Georgios Papandreou after three consecutive victories of Konstantinos Karamanlis and his National Radical Union and after 11 years, during which the conservative parties (Greek Rally and its successor, the National Radical Union) ruled Greece.

== Background ==
The early elections were caused by Karamanlis' resignation. It was a fierce confrontation with King Paul I and the royal family that led to the fall of the right-wing government. The King (influenced by the Queen Frederika and his son Constantine, according to Karamanlis' later argumentation) didn't follow the prime minister's instructions, concerning an official visit of the royal family to the United Kingdom. The King's stance outraged Karamanlis, who submitted immediately his resignation.

The political unrest was also exacerbated by Georgios Papandreou's fierce opposition. The leader of the Center Union was still refusing to accept the official results of the 1961 parliamentary elections, the elections of "violence and fraud", according to his aggressive rhetoric. Hence, he refused to legitimise the Parliament and he was inciting public manifestations against Karamanlis and the Palace.

In his "uncompromising struggle", Papandreou was supported by the United Democratic Left (ΕΔΑ), which was the party that suffered the greatest losses in the 1961 elections and it had reasons to believe, that it was hurt by the alleged election fraud.

In his archives, Constantine Karamanlis recognises limited incidents of fraud in the 1961 elections, but he insists that these incidents:

- had not influenced the outcome, because the National Radical Union had a huge lead,
- had been incited by the Palace and not himself,
- the Party hurt by these incidents was the United Democratic Left (ΕΔΑ) and not the Center Union and his leader, Georgios Papandreou, who knew about the fraud and tolerated it, believing that his party would be favored.

Another incident, which blackened the image of the National Radical Union's government was the killing of the deputy of the United Democratic Left (ΕΔΑ), Grigoris Lambrakis. Karamanlis denied any involvement of his government in the killing and he demanded the immediate intervention of the justice. Indeed, the resulting investigation by Christos Sartzetakis proved that there was no involvement of the government in the attack.

Nevertheless, the fact that some far-right fractions were proven to be guilty for the killing harmed Karamanlis, who seemed in the eyes of the public unable to control the extremists. This failure of the government was underlined by his own legendary apophthegm: "Who's governing this country?"

=== Interim governments ===
After he resigned, Karamanlis demanded immediate elections, wanting to take advantage of the timing. Nevertheless, King Paul I preferred to appoint an interim government, led by one of Karamanlis' closest colleagues, Panagiotis Pipinelis, whose role would be to pass a new electoral law, accepted by the main party of the opposition, and to put under control the political unrest. Nevertheless, Pipinelis' government failed to present a worthy work and it resigned, under Georgios Papandreou's arrows. Then, the King, under the pressure of Papandreou and disregarding Karamanlis' instructions, appointed a new "neutral" interim government, which would carry out the elections. This government, fiercefully criticised by Karamanlis, was led by the president of the Court of Cassation.

== Results ==
Because of the slim difference of votes between the two biggest parties and, also, because of the electoral system, no party managed to have an absolute majority in the Parliament. In his later personal notes, as presented in his archives, Constantine Karamanlis justifies his party's narrow defeat with the following arguments:

- His party underestimated the people's fatigue, after so many years of National Radical Union's government and after so many months of political unrest.
- His party had lost the right timing, which slipped away from it just after Pipinelis' government resignation and the appointment of a new interim government.
- The interim government, which conducted the elections, was not really neutral, but it favored in various backhanded ways the Center Union.
- The United Democratic Left (ΕΔΑ) favored the Center Union, convincing a limited but important number of its supporters to vote for Georgios Papandreou.
- His Party should have shaped an alliance with the conservative Progressive Party of Spyros Markezinis. An agreement of this kind would have resulted in a victory of the right-wing alliance.

Just after the elections, Karamanlis left for Paris, with his wife. Noteworthy, he had also left for France, just after his resignation, but he returned, in order to lead his party in the elections.

Party	Votes	%	Seats	+/–
Centre Union	1,962,074	42.04	138	+52
National Radical Union	1,837,377	39.37	132	–44
United Democratic Left	669,267	14.34	28	+6
Progressive Party	173,981	3.73	2	–12
List of Independents	22,093	0.47	0	0
Christian Democracy	1,267	0.03	0	New
Movement for Democracy and Socialism	1,095	0.02	0	New
Total	4,667,154	100.00	300	0
Valid votes	4,667,154	99.11		
Invalid/blank votes	41,697	0.89		
Total votes	4,708,851	100.00		
Registered voters/turnout	5,662,965	83.15		
Source: Nohlen & Stöver

== Aftermath ==
The outcome of the elections consisted a deadlock. Constantine Karamanlis proposed the formation of a new interim "neutral" government, whose duty would be to conduct new elections. However, Georgios Papandreou was outspoken about his right to form a government of himself, in order to carry out the new elections.

King Paul I followed Papandreou's instructions, giving him the order to form an interim government, whose role would be to lead the country to new elections.

Karamanlis questioned the constitutionality of the King's decision, but, instead of insisting in his opinion, he preferred to resign and leave the country. Following his proposal, the party he founded, the National Radical Union chose Panagiotis Kanellopoulos as his successor.
