= Betty Bartlett-Ambatielos =

- Born: Betty Bartlett; October 1917; Pontypridd, Wales
- Died: 16 October 2011 (aged 93–94); Piraeus, Greece
- Known for: Activism

Betty Bartlett-Ambatielos (October 1917 – 16 October 2011) was an Anglo-Greek communist activist. She is known for her fight on behalf of Greek political prisoners.

== Biography ==
Betty Bartlett was born in Pontypridd. The daughter of a schoolteacher and a mines inspector, Betty Bartlett joined the Communist Party of Britain in 1937. After several years of activism in Birmingham, the party sent her to Cardiff to act as an intermediary with the Greek Seamen's Union in 1940. There she met Antonis Ampatielos, a leading member of the Greek Communist Party, with whom she soon began an affair. The couple married in 1944 and soon afterward left for Greece, a country that had just been liberated from the Nazi occupation.

At the time, the first episode of the Greek Civil War was taking place, pitting communists against conservatives. An active member of the Communist Party, Tony Ambatielos was arrested in 1945 and sentenced to death. Despite the danger, Betty chose to stay in Greece and actively campaigned for her husband's release. Her efforts were in vain, but she at least managed to get Tony's sentence commuted to life imprisonment in 1948.

In 1949, Betty returned to the United Kingdom, where she founded, with other personalities, the League for Democracy in Greece, a lobbying tool fiercely opposed to the regime in power in Athens. In 1961, she attacked Prime Minister Konstantinos Karamanlis during his official visit to London. Two years later, she led protesters who chased Queen Frederika of Greece and her daughter Irene out of their hotel in London, an event that caused diplomatic tensions between Greece and the United Kingdom in 1963.

In 1964, Tony was finally released and Betty joined him in Greece. With the Communist Party still banned, the couple campaigned within its legal umbrella, the United Democratic Left (EDA).

In 1967, the Greek junta placed Betty and Tony under arrest. In May 1967, the case was raised in the House of Commons by Labour Members of Parliament (MPs) Richard Kelley and Anne Kerr. Thanks to international pressure, Betty was released in June, but her husband remained in prison for many more years. Back in London, Betty resumed her lobbying work against the Greek dictatorship.

With the restoration of democracy, Betty returned to Greece once again. In 1981, she was elected to the central office of the now-authorized Greek Communist Party.

She died in 2011.

== Works ==
- (en) They shall not die : the trial of Greek Freedom : based on letters from Betty Bartlett (1949)
- (en) Asimina Ambatielos: the story of a heroic Greek mother (1951)
- (en) Give me back my husband: Release Tony Ambatielos and all the political prisoners of Greece (1963)
