= All-Democratic Agricultural Front =

All-Democratic Agricultural Front Πανδημοκρατικό Αγροτικό Μέτωπο (ΠΑΜΕ)
- Leader: Ioannis Passalidis
- Founded: 30 September 1961
- Dissolved: 1963
- Ideology: Communism; Democratic socialism Agrarianism
- Political position: Left-wing to far-left

The All-Democratic Agricultural Front (PAME; Greek: Πανδημοκρατικό Αγροτικό Μέτωπο (ΠΑΜΕ)) was a left-wing electoral coalition formed to contest the 1961 Greek legislative election. The coalition elected 24 MPs.

Members to the coalition were:

- United Democratic Left, the biggest left-wing party in Greece
- National Agricultural Party, a small agrarian party founded by centre-left politicians
