= Paul of Greece =

King of Greece from 1947 to 1964

Paul
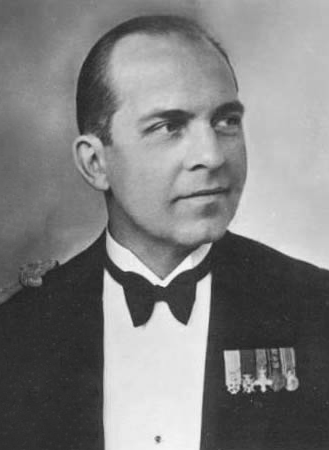
- Paul in 1939

King of the Hellenes
- Reign: 1 April 1947 – 6 March 1964
- Inauguration: 2 April 1947
- Predecessor: George II
- Successor: Constantine II
- Regent: Crown Prince Constantine (from February 1964)
- Born: 14 December 1901; Tatoi Palace, Kingdom of Greece
- Died: 6 March 1964 (aged 62); Tatoi Palace, Kingdom of Greece
- Burial: 12 March 1964; Royal Cemetery, Tatoi Palace, Greece
- Spouse: Frederica of Hanover (m. 1938)
- Issue: Sofía, Queen of Spain; Constantine II, King of Greece; Princess Irene
- Greek: Παύλος
- House: Glücksburg
- Father: Constantine I of Greece
- Mother: Sophia of Prussia
- Military career
- Allegiance: Kingdom of Greece (Note: Paul also trained with the British and German navies for numerous prolonged periods of time.)
- Branch: Royal Hellenic Army; Royal Hellenic Navy; Royal Hellenic Air Force
- Service years: 1912–1941 (Note: Paul served sporadically between these years, primarily in the Navy. He became a cadet in 1912. By 1941, he was a lieutenant.)
- Rank: Second Lieutenant

Paul (Greek: Παύλος, romanized: Pavlos; 14 December 1901 – 6 March 1964) was King of Greece from 1 April 1947 until his death on 6 March 1964.

Paul was born at Tatoi Palace as the third son of Crown Prince Constantine and Crown Princess Sophia of Greece. In 1912, the year before his father ascended the throne, Paul joined the Royal Hellenic Navy at eleven years old, becoming the youngest cadet at the time. After the National Schism during World War I, Constantine's abdication was forced and Paul and his family went into exile in Switzerland. Paul's brother, Alexander, became the Greek sovereign in 1917 when Constantine and Paul were exiled, however, Alexander's death in 1920 led to Constantine's restoration. In 1922, Paul's other brother, George, became the monarch. However, a referendum in 1924 two years later saw the abolition of the Greek monarchy. Paul moved to Italy with his family and then to London.

In London, Paul had an affair with his first cousin and his first love, Princess Nina Georgievna of Russia, who would eventually reject his marriage proposal. The monarchy and George's position as king were restored after another referendum in 1935. George was childless, which made Paul the heir presumptive and gave him the responsibility of finding a spouse and having children. At the 1936 Summer Olympics in Berlin, Paul successfully proposed to Frederica of Hanover, whom he had been seeing regularly for the past year. However, Paul's engagement to a German princess received a mixed reaction in Greece, especially since Adolf Hitler attempted to include Nazi swastika flags at their wedding ceremony. Paul was forced out of Greece with his family during World War II when Greece fell to the Axis Powers. Paul moved to Egypt and then South Africa, where he left his wife and three young children and moved to London with his brother for the remainder of the war.

After the conclusion of World War II, George returned via another referendum, while the Greek Civil War erupted. When George died in 1947, Paul succeeded his brother and became the King of Greece. Paul soon contracted typhoid fever, which restricted his ability to manage the Greek Civil War. The war nonetheless concluded in 1949 with monarchists defeating communist forces in the country. During his reign, Paul was also increasingly faced with deterioration in Greco-British relations and Greco-Turkish relations as he worked to achieve enosis. For his support of the movement, Paul was labelled a terrorist in the British media. Though Paul successfully secured money from the Marshall Plan to fund recovery and infrastructure projects, he was criticised for limiting democracy when the new 1952 Greek constitution gave extensive powers to the monarch. During his reign, Paul was commended by the media for his numerous state visits to multiple countries. He was later diagnosed with stomach cancer and died in 1964. He was succeeded by his only son, who became Constantine II. Paul had three children: Queen Sofía of Spain, Constantine II of Greece, and Princess Irene. Paul was also a first cousin of Prince Philip, Duke of Edinburgh.

== Early life ==
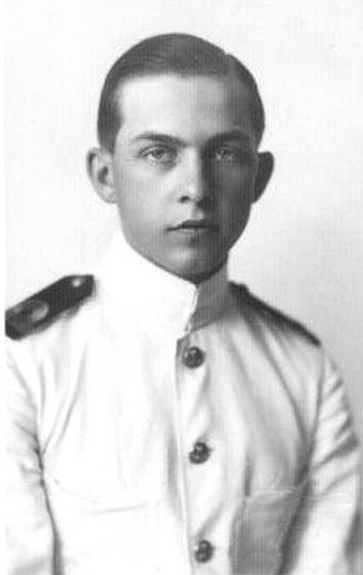
Paul as a teenager

Paul was born on 14 December [Old Style: 1 December] 1901 at the Tatoi Palace in Attica north of Athens, the third son of Crown Prince Constantine and his wife, Princess Sophia of Prussia. To his family, he was known as Palo.

Paul grew up in the Presidential Mansion, where his parents resided, and Tatoi Palace, the official residency of the Greek monarch. Paul grew up with five other siblings. When Paul was three years old, his brother, Alexander, almost killed him by accidentally throwing him off a cart that was going full speed into the royal gardens. Paul grew up speaking English to his parents and learned Greek as a second language.

Paul was born as fourth in line to the Greek throne, behind his father and two older brothers. As a result, Paul did not receive a sophisticated education. He was privately tutored by foreign teachers, Greek university professors, who were chosen by Constantine, and Dr Hoenig, his mother's Pomeranian chaplain. From 1911 to 1914, Paul travelled to the UK to attend summer courses in Eastbourne at Saint Peter's Preparatory School for Young Gentlemen. Paul was said to stand out in more physical subjects, such as woodwork, and in discipline.

In 1909, when Paul was seven years old, a group of Greek officers mounted a coup d'état against his grandfather, George I of Greece. The officers, led by Nikolaos Zorbas, declared themselves in support of the monarchy, however, asked George I to dismiss his sons from the army. His sons instead resigned from the army. As a result of criticism, Constantine decided to move with his wife and his sons, including Paul, to Germany for several months. The family stayed with Princess Margaret of Prussia, who was Paul's maternal aunt, in Kronberg. The family returned to Greece at the beginning of 1911, when the new Greek Prime minister, Eleftherios Venizelos, allowed the princes to regain the ranks in the military. The following year, in 1912, and until 1913, Greece fought in the Balkan Wars. Greece was able to double its size in territory in the wars, during which Paul served as the youngest cadet in the Hellenic navy, at eleven years old.

== World War I and aftermath ==
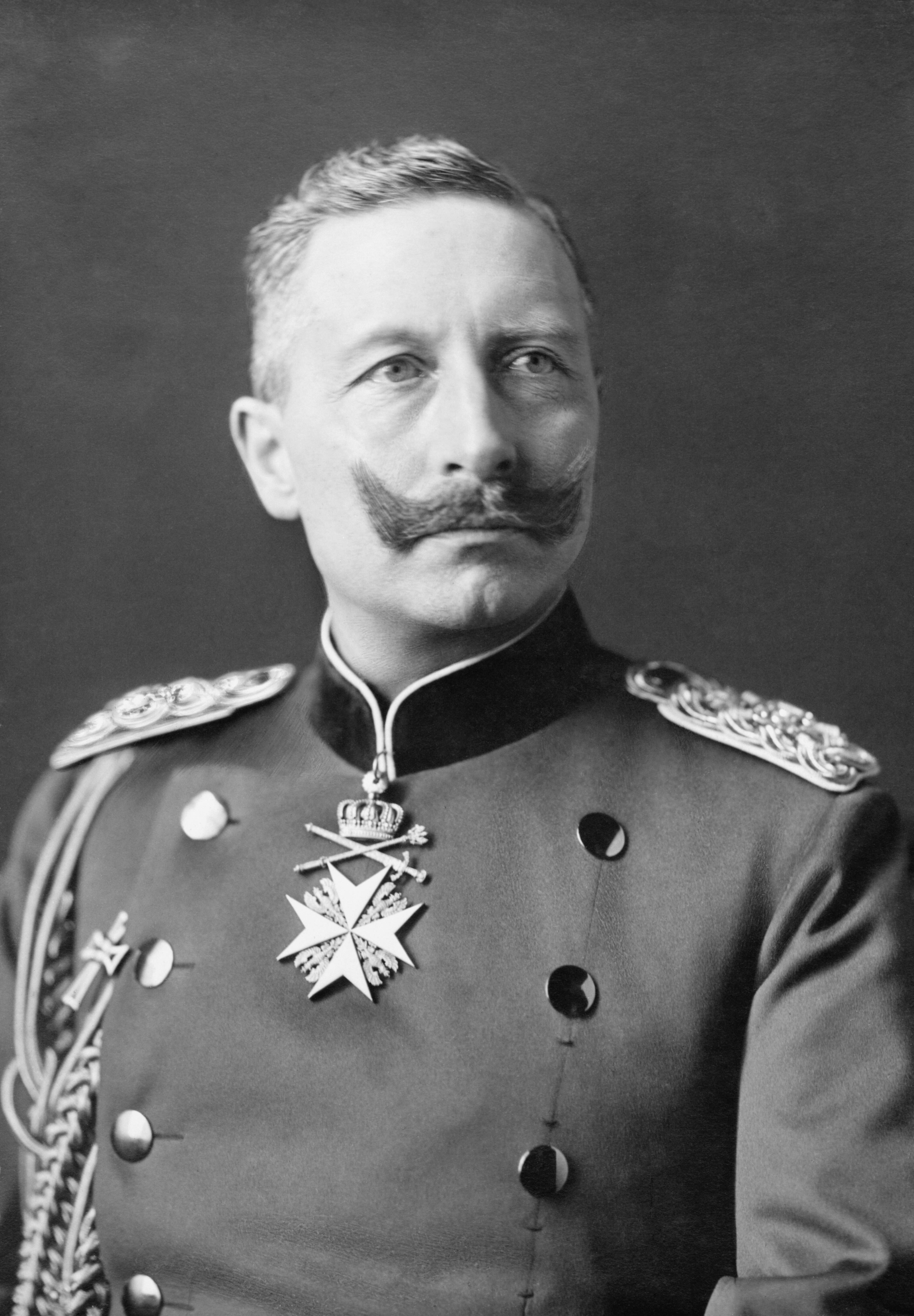
Paul's father insisted Greece remained neutral in World War I to appease Paul's uncle, Wilhelm II (pictured).

=== National Schism ===
Paul's father, Constantine, ascended to the throne upon the assassination of George I in 1913. Constantine wished to keep Greece neutral during the prelude to World War I, but was in support of the Central Powers, since he was the brother-in-law of the German Kaiser, Wilhelm II. Venizelos, however, was staunchly in support of joining the Allies due to the Ottoman Empire's mistreatment of its Greek population. The disagreement between Constantine and Venizelos quickly resulted in the National Schism, a civil war between the two opposing sides. Per Van der Kiste, possibly due to "being afraid" of Wilhelm II, Constantine continued to refuse to succumb to Venizelos' demands. Constantine was also pressured to oppose Venizelos by Ioannis Metaxas. On 10 June 1917, Charles Jonnart, who acted as the Allies' representative in Greece, ordered Constantine to abdicate. The Allies threatened to invade Greece from a military landing at Piraeus, so Constantine unofficially abdicated. The Allies did not wish to replace Greece with a republican system, so Venizelos scrambled to find a replacement king. It was finally decided that Paul's older brother, Alexander, though not the eldest son of Constantine, would succeed to the throne, as Constantine's eldest son, George, was also seen as pro-German. Following Jonnart's demands for abdication, Paul and his family, except for Alexander, had evacuated Athens.

=== Exile to Switzerland ===
Paul and his family briefly travelled to Oropos, before going through Italy to live in Switzerland. They first resided in St. Moritz and then in Zürich. The rest of the extended Greek royal family joined them when Venizelos announced Greece's entry into World War I. In 1918, Constantine contracted the Spanish flu, causing him to fall severely ill and restricting him from providing for Paul and his other children. The disease almost killed him, however, he managed to recover. Constantine remained concerned about Paul's lack of education after the Greek government refused his entry into the British Royal Navy. To Paul's dismay, Constantine accepted the offer made by Wilhelm II for Paul to join the Imperial German Navy. Paul soon left Switzerland for Germany and became a cadet.

Paul continued to join the German Imperial Naval Academy, where his training was supervised by his uncle, Prince Henry of Prussia. However, when the German Revolution arose, many naval officers and their crews began mutinies, such as the Kiel mutiny, while the German monarchies began being overthrown, forcing Paul to evacuate back to Switzerland. However, before leaving the country, Paul contracted the Spanish flu, delaying his reunion with his family. It took Paul several days to finally travel back to Switzerland.

After World War I, Greece had made territorial gains in Thrace and Anatolia per the Treaty of Sèvres, to the dismay of the Ottomans, causing the Greco-Turkish War. Despite the war's resolution, tension between Constantine and Venizelos still remained high. Paul's brother, Alexander, died of sepsis after having been bitten by a monkey, leaving Greece without a monarch and plunging the country into a constitutional crisis. Venizelos sought to find a replacement successor. The Greek parliament refused to reinstate Constantine, and thus Venizelos, on 29 October 1920, sent a letter to the Greek ambassador to Switzerland at the National Hotel in Lucerne, requesting that he meet with Paul, who he saw as the new potential king.

The following day, Paul sent a letter to the ambassador expressing his refusal to disregard the laws of succession to the crown, which is what would occur if Paul were instated as the monarch. Paul wrote that neither his father, Constantine, nor his older brother, George, had ever renounced their rights to the throne and that therefore, his ascension to the throne would be illegitimate. The Greek throne remained vacant while Greece fought in the Greco-Turkish War, during the Turkish War of Independence. During the 1920 Greek legislative election, fighting broke out between a sector of monarchists, who protested for Constantine's reascension to the throne, and supporters of Venizelos. On 14 November 1920, the monarchists won and it was organised for Constantine to become King of the Hellenes, while Venizelos was replaced with Dimitrios Rallis. Before Venizelos' exit from office, he requested that Paul's grandmother, Olga Constantinovna of Russia, act as regent before Constantine returned.

=== Return to Greece ===
On 19 December 1920, Paul and the other Greek royals returned to Greece. They were greeted by demonstrations in support of the monarchy. However, Constantine's restoration was criticised by Greece's allies in the concurrent Greco-Turkish war, most of which were also Greece's allies in World War I, to which Constantine refused to join. Constantine was denied additional support from the Allies in the war against Turkey, allowing Mustafa Kemal to eventually make more territorial gains. Constantine left Paul and his other children with his wife in 1921 when he travelled to Anatolia to boost the morale of Greek troops. While on the frontlines, Constantine attempted to boost confidence by reminding soldiers of their successes in the Balkan Wars. However, after only a few months, Constantine reunited with his children at Tatoi in September 1921.

Upon their return to Greece, Paul wished to resume his naval training and joined the Hellenic Naval Academy, taking up residence in the academy's boarding school, located in Piraeus. Paul studied and trained there for two years and was promoted to the rank of second lieutenant in 1922. Paul served for several months on a Greek cruiser, the Elli. Despite Greece's involvement in the Turkish War of Independence, Paul never fought in a battle but participated in the evacuation of Greek and Armenian refugees from Smyrnan shores following the burning of Smyrna by Turkish troops. Turkey later defeated Greece and their allies, who had been suffering since the fall of Smyrna in August 1922.

== Crown Prince ==
=== Abdication of father ===
Republican propaganda began gaining speed and was being produced by supporters of Venizelos, who was no longer serving in office. On 11 September 1922, a precinct of the army, led by colonels Nikolaos Plastiras and Stylianos Gonatas, conducted a coup d'état which turned into the 11 September 1922 Revolution, where the second abdication of Constantine was demanded, in addition to the dissolution of the Greek parliament. To avoid unrest and civil war, Constantine abdicated on 27 September, before fleeing to Palermo with his wife and daughters, leaving his two sons, Paul and George, behind. George, the eldest son, succeeded him as George II during political instability caused by the ongoing effects and aftermath of the Greek genocide.

With his brother remaining childless, Paul was officially declared the Crown Prince of Greece. However, the birth of a child between George and his wife, Elisabeth of Romania, would remove Paul from his first-in-line position to the throne. With greater roles as Crown Prince, Paul greater divided his time between serving as a lieutenant in the navy and completing his royal duties in Athens, where he attempted to assist George and Elisabeth in their roles of positively representing the monarchy, which had been facing backlash for almost the past decade. Paul and George's father, Constantine, died in exile on 11 January 1923. The government refused to give Constantine a state funeral and Paul was placed in charge of organising his funeral in Italy.

The Greek royal family further suffered damage to its reputation when Paul was involved in a car accident, which resulted in the death of a member of the public. George was forced to pay a large sum of money as compensation for the victim's family by using the royal family's funds, which had already been greatly depleted because of the Greco-Turkish war.

=== Second Hellenic Republic ===
In the 1923 Greek legislative election, Venizelos and his party won victory in the Greek parliament and were to assume government at the commencing of the following year. Gonatas, who was serving as prime minister, called for the Greek royal family's evacuation of the country while Venizelos and the victorious Liberal Party prepared to assume government. George succumbed to political pressure but refused to abdicate. Tatoi told the press that George and the royal family would be taking an official visit to Romania to visit Elisabeth's family, however they were going into exile. George and Elisabeth left the country first, followed by Paul and other members of the royal family on 19 December 1923, residing in Bucharest.

Two months after Venizelos' government was proclaimed, the Kingdom of Greece was replaced by the Second Hellenic Republic on 25 March 1924, Greece's national independence day. Two and a half weeks later, the democratically conducted 1924 Greek republic referendum occurred, confirming the abolition of the monarchy and officially removing George as Greece's head of state and Paul as the Crown Prince of Greece. The Greek royal family became stateless, however, Paul was granted a Danish passport from his cousin, Christian X of Denmark.

In Bucharest, where the royal family remained, Paul was welcomed by his sister, Princess Helen, who was unhappily married to the future Carol II of Romania. Not too long after arriving in Romania, Paul departed to stay with his mother and sisters, Princess Irene and Princess Katherine, at the Viva Bobolina in Fiesole. Whilst there, Paul took piano lessons with a retired Italian concert artist.

After living in Tuscany, Paul drove his Lancia Lambda to London, where he wished to become employed. His royal connections to London allowed him to obtain a job in the aeronautics industry, which he wished to join. According to historian Stelios Hourmouzios, Henry Drummond Wolff, and according to historian Ricardo Mateos Sáinz de Medrano, Alphonse d'Orléans, helped Paul become hired as an apprentice mechanic for Armstrong Siddeley. Paul took on the name Paul Beck, which referred to his family's descent from the House of Schleswig-Holstein-Sonderburg-Glücksburg, and used that name when renting a room in a house in Clarendon Square, Leamington. Paul travelled to Coventry daily, where he worked in assembling aircraft engines. Paul used his salary to help financially aid his mother in Italy.

After working for Armstrong Siddeley for ten months, Paul departed Coventry and arrived in London, moving into a flat near Victoria Station. Paul joined the Royal Air Force Club of Piccadilly and the Artists' Rifles Association Club of Raven Street. Concurrently, he attended hunts and regattas organised by the aristocracy, whilst continuing to learn the piano with his friend, Lieutenant-Colonel F. Alan Parker. Paul would frequently visit his friend, who worked as a doctor at St Thomas' Hospital. After attending and overlooking several surgeries, Paul discovered that he was interested in the operations of hospitals and other medical centres.

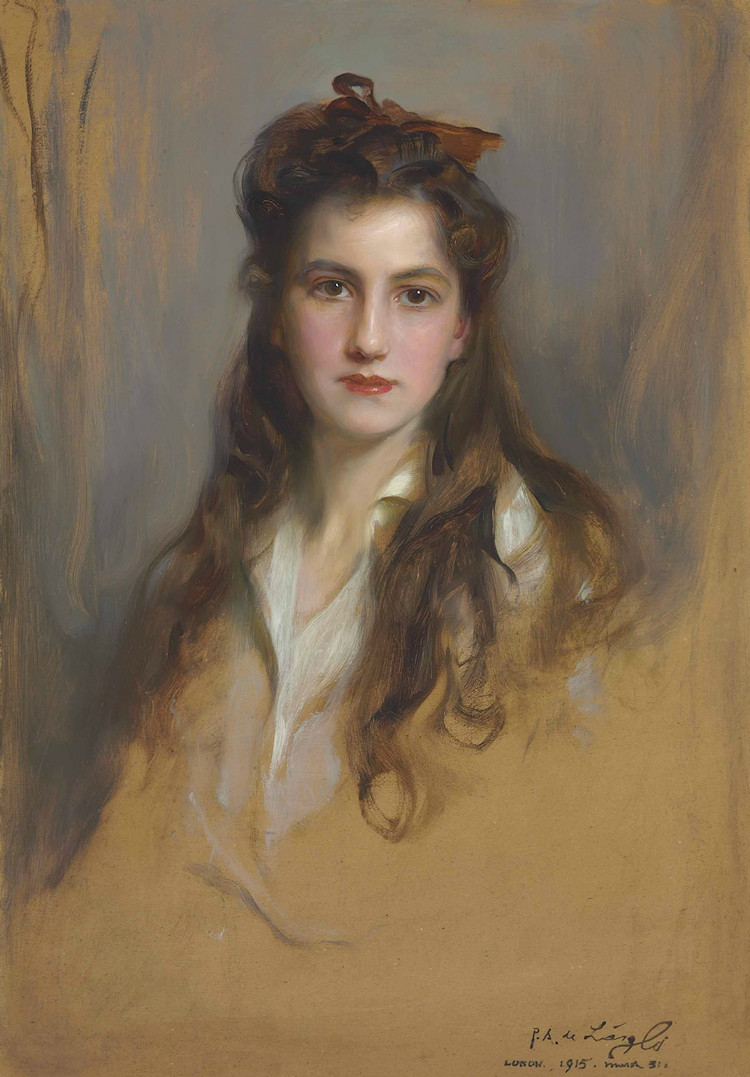
Paul's first love was Princess Nina Georgievna of Russia.

Paul's family discovered an affair between him and Princess Nina Georgievna of Russia, but he claimed that he had fallen in love. Nina was the elder daughter of Paul's aunt, Maria, and Grand Duke George Mikhailovich of Russia, making her Paul's first cousin. However, Nina rejected his later marriage proposal, choosing instead to marry Prince Paul Aleksandrovich Chavchavadze in 1922. Thereupon, Paul became reportedly demotivated in finding a spouse due to his mother's disapproval of his marrying a commoner, insisting that he marry someone of blue blood. This was because Paul's brother, Alexander, had married a commoner Aspasia Manos and the birth of their child took years to be legitimized. Paul's mother soon landed in England and convinced Paul that he was reducing the family's chances of being restored. Paul became pressured as the responsibility of continuing the family's lineage increased due to George and Elisabeth's sterility. However, Paul held off from finding himself a relationship.

In Spring 1930 Paul met Captain Frederick Wessel, a wealthy annuitant of Danish origin. Wessel invited him on his planned cruise through the Aegean Sea on his personal yacht. Although Paul was eager to travel through his old homeland, he was still banned from entering Greek waters, so he and Wessel agreed to hide his identity and refrain from any political activity while on their trip. On 10 July 1930, Paul boarded Wessel's boat, the Frefrada, from Villefranche-sur-Mer. The yacht travelled along the French and Italian coastline for three weeks, before landing in Corfu on 2 August 1930. Paul and the rest of the group traveled around the Greek islands for the next month and a half, arriving through the Gulf of Patras on 5 August, Corinth on 7 August, the port of Phalerum in Athens in Vouliagmeni on 19 August, through Chalki, Euboea, Skiathos and Skyros by 25 August, Kymi on 26 August, through Andros, Syros, Santorini and Crete by 29 August, and then finally in Navarino and Argostoli by 12 September. Following this final stop, the yacht returned to Italy.

While illegally travelling through Greece, Paul visited his former residences, Mon Repos, the former royal palace in Athens, and Tatoi. While at Tatoi, an old servant recognized him and allowed him to come inside to see the palace's rooms. To the disapproval of Wessel, Paul was able to talk to members of the media about the restoration of the monarchy and learned that many Greeks were now opposing the republic due to its instability. However, Paul managed to keep his identity hidden and only few people he spoke to recognized him.

The following year, Paul's mother was diagnosed with cancer. He went to Italy to help her but was unaware that she had been moved to Germany. Paul went to Germany and his mother, whose condition had worsened, died in Frankfurt on 13 January 1932 while with her children. Paul soon became closer to his three sisters and established a home with Helen, who had bought the Bobolina villa after divorcing Carol II of Romania.

=== Restoration of the monarchy ===
The Second Hellenic Republic had tired most Greeks out, with, in only eleven years, 23 governments, 13 coup d'états and one dictatorship. Each government lasted on average six months, while a coup was either attempted or organized every 42 weeks. The majority of Greeks were now opposed to the republic, and many called for the return of the monarchy. However, monarchists were divided over who should take up the Greek throne. Most supported George's restoration, however, there were large minorities that wished for the king to be a different person, such as Prince George, Duke of Kent. The Greek army finally deposed Prime Minister Panagis Tsaldaris and President Alexandros Zaimis on 10 October 1935, and replaced them with the Minister of War, Georgios Kondylis, who had been a supporter of Venizelos during the National Schism. Despite this, Kondylis disapproved of the republic and publicly claimed while in office that it had brought anarchy to the country. Kondylis' government proclaimed that the Kingdom of Greece had been restored, and he became the regent of Greece while George travelled from England to take back the crown. Before doing so, George, supported by Paul and other members of the family, ordered that a referendum be hosted to confirm his return.

The 1935 Greek monarchy referendum was held, which affirmed that 97.87% of Greeks were in support of the return of the king. Foreign observers at the time claimed that the vote was rigged and noted concerns that voters who were opposed to the monarchy would face beatings. Once the figure of the supposed overwhelming support for the monarchy was announced, a Greek ambassador met with George and Paul at the Greek embassy in London and officially requested that they return to Tatoi. On 5 November 1935, they accepted and began their journeys back to Greece on 14 November. Before returning to Greece, they stopped in Paris and met President Albert Lebrun and their uncle, Prince Andrew. Paul and George then stopped in Italy to collect their sisters, who had been living in the Villa Sparta, and other members of the Greek royal family, such as Prince Christopher. Paul and his family briefly went to Florence to pay homage to their parents, who had been buried temporarily beside the Church of the Nativity of Christ and St. Nicholas, a Russian Orthodox Church. In Rome, Victor Emmanuel III gifted the Greek royals the Supreme Order of the Most Holy Annunciation. The Elli took the family from Brindisi back to Athens, where they arrived on 25 November and were welcomed by a large applauding crowd.

Paul became overwhelmed with his royal duties upon George's almost immediate neglect of his role within Greece. Historian John Van der Kiste describes George as having become a "suspicious and taciturn man" who had little interest in showing affinity and becoming close with his younger brother, Paul. Both living at Tatoi, their interactions became awkward and their relationship distanced, while both had little affection for one another. Paul frequently acted as the unofficial regent for Greece and often represented George at events, such as at the repatriation of their parents' bodies to the Tatoi burial grounds and at Venizelos' funeral in 1936. Additionally, Paul resumed his duties within the navy, further overworking him. His royal duties restricted him from working out at sea, however, he worked to develop and modernise the Scouts of Greece, which he became the president of during the 1920s.

On 4 August 1936, while George continued to neglect his role, General Metaxas overthrew the democratically elected government with a dictatorship. Paul distanced himself from both George and Metaxas after the Scouts of Greece was forced to be integrated into the National Youth Organisation, a fascist movement supported by Metaxas. Paul received the wrath of Metaxas on multiple occasions when he refused to perform the fascist salute at official events and ceremonies.

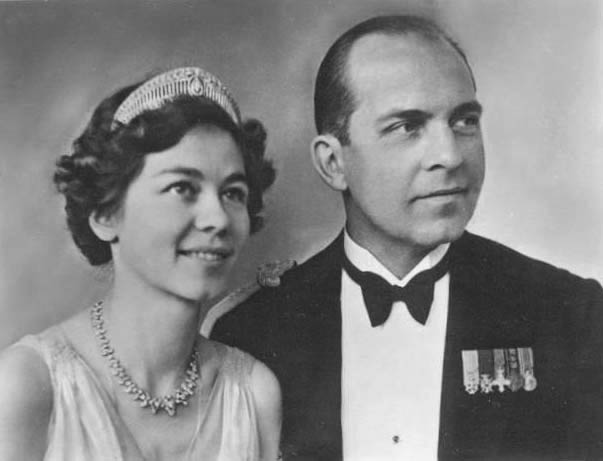
Paul (right) and Frederica (left) first met in 1927.

Since his brother looked unlikely to marry and have children, Paul bore the responsibility of providing an heir to the Greek throne. Paul attempted to use his interests in tennis and archeology to appeal to younger girls.

Earlier in 1927 while visiting his mother in Austria, Paul had met Frederica of Hanover at the Hubertihaus estate. Frederica was only ten years old at the time and called Paul, who was sixteen years older, "my uncle", as Paul was a first cousin of Frederica's mother, Princess Victoria Louise. In 1934, Paul and Frederica met again in London at the wedding of Princess Marina of Greece and Denmark and Prince George, Duke of Kent. The next year, Frederica met Paul in Florence while studying at the American College. Frederica stayed with Paul's sisters during this time. The pair met several times at the Villa Sparta and were said to have fallen in love. Paul's sisters were highly supportive of the relationship and attempted to encourage it, before Paul wrote to Frederica's parents, Victoria Louise and Ernest Augustus, Duke of Brunswick, and asked for their consent to marry her. However, Ernest Augustus declined because of Frederica's young age. Mateos Sáinz de Medrano describes Paul as having been "highly disappointed" at Ernest Augustus's response, but he did not give up on finding a spouse. Although it is reported that Paul was looking for a Greek commoner to marry, he searched and found Frederica during his trip to Germany for the 1936 Berlin Olympic Games. He went to the Königinvilla in Gmunden and asked Frederica's parents again if he could marry her, to which they finally agreed. Paul and Frederica's engagement was soon announced to the public.

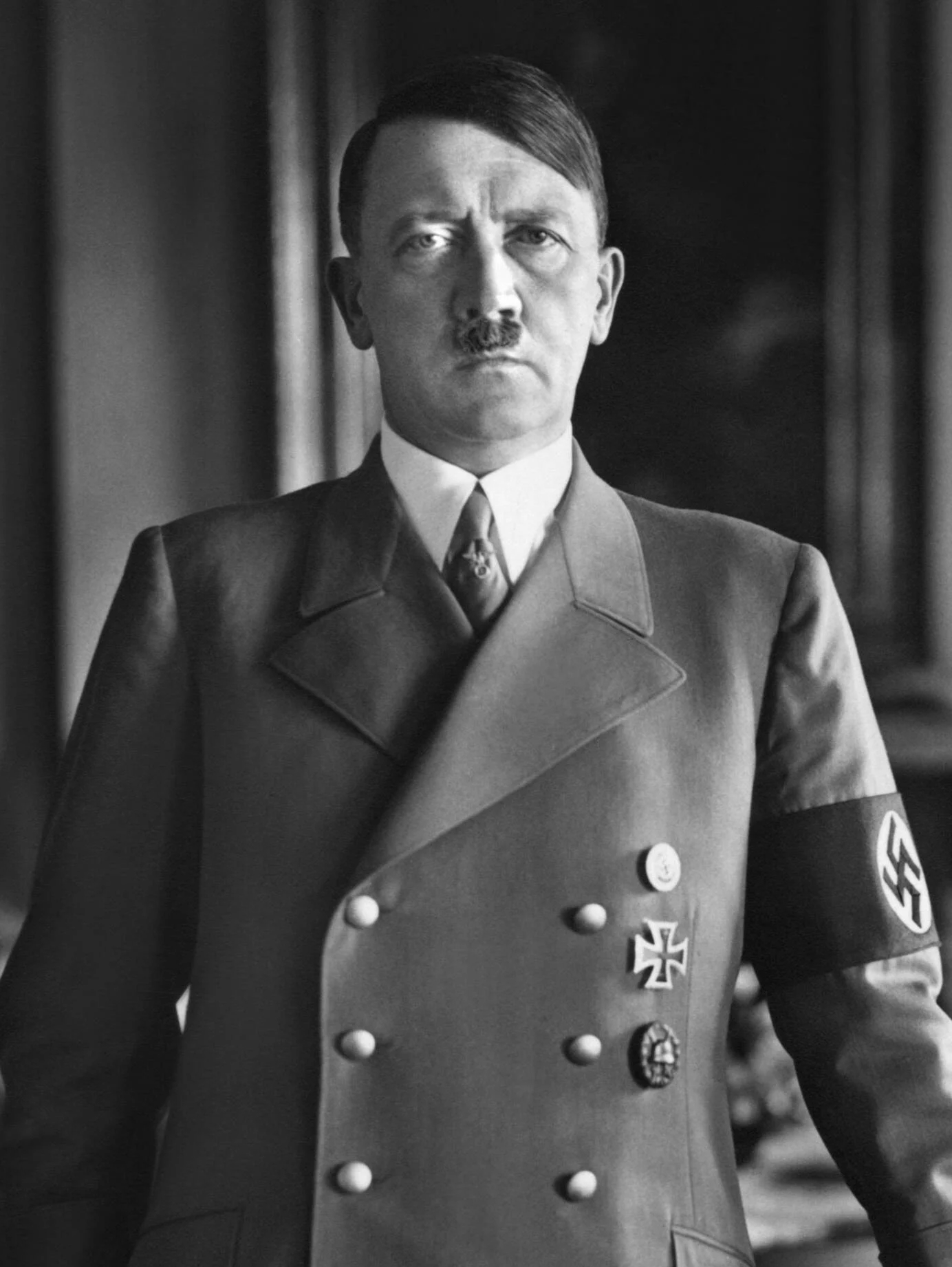
At the wedding of Paul and Frederica, who was German, Adolf Hitler planned to include Nazi flags.

When Paul returned to Greece, his engagement was met with mixed reception. Many Greeks had turned against the royal family when George consented to the Metaxas dictatorship due to his lack of interest in his role. Many citizens were also worried of the cost of the Crown Prince's wedding due to the effects of the Great Depression, and protests against taxpayer money being spent on glamorous royal events were held across the country. Paul lacked a personal residence and therefore relied on public expenditure to fund his wedding. Furthermore, the choice of a German bride concerned many Greeks as they feared that the dynasty would become less Greek, reinforced by the family's Danish and German roots. The public was also scared of the backlash from the former Allies of World War I, especially since Constantine I's marriage to a German princess had caused the National Schism within the country. Metaxas, however, approved of Paul’s marriage to Frederica because he hoped that it would strengthen ties between Greece and the fascist Nazi regime in Germany, led by Adolf Hitler, who wanted to use the marriage to spread influence in Greece. Hitler also planned to include Nazi symbols, flags, and anthems at the couple's 1938 wedding. George wished to distance Greece from the dynasty's German origins and was thus opposed to their marriage. Frederica, being Hanoverian, was a close relative of the British family and had to ask permission from George VI to marry Paul, a Greek Orthodox prince.

Frederica had not arrived yet in Greece when the Church of Greece asked her to adopt a Greek name as there was no Orthodox Saint yet that had ever had her first name. The Church explained that by choosing a Greek name, she would be able to identify with Greece's culture and religion, and would provide her with more popularity. However, Frederica refused this request by the Holy Synod by claiming that her name was an integral part of her identity. Frederica's insistence continued and the Church was forced to reluctantly abandon their request. The Greek public however was arguably more shocked at the fact that swastikas, a symbol used by the Nazi Party, were present at Paul and Frederica's wedding ceremony. To block Nazi flags, Paul and George planned to raise Greek flags and also the former Hanoverian kingdom's flags throughout the streets of Athens. However, the former official regional flags were banned in Germany and thus Frederica opposed this because she was worried about displeasing Hitler, who she feared would threaten her parents, who resided in Germany.

In early January 1938, Frederica and her parents arrived in Greece through the country's border with Yugoslavia, where Paul and Metaxas personally greeted them. On 9 January 1938, their wedding was conducted alongside multiple balls, banquets, and concerts throughout the country. Many Greek citizens were opposed to the wedding's high costs resulting from the accommodation and transport of high-profile guests and wedding participants, most of whom stayed at the Hotel Grande Bretagne while waiting for the wedding. At the wedding, there was an overwhelming number of German princes, princesses and representatives, which the Greek public saw as discomforting. At the wedding, Paul wore the outfit of an admiral in the Greek navy and his witnesses were his nephew, the Crown Prince of Romania, and his cousin, Grand Duke Dimitri Pavlovich of Russia, along with his three brothers-in-law, the Hereditary Prince of Brunswick, Prince George William and Prince Christian Oscar.

The Greek government’s wedding present to Paul was the Psychiko Palace, a villa in Psychiko, a district of Athens. The palace was built by a wealthy Greek magnate and was made up of two floors, a small garden, and a balcony that faced the streets. It was redecorated by his sister, Irene, before Paul and Frederica moved in. The government gave Frederica a small farm in Polydendri forest, near the town of Larissa in Thessaly. Frederica soon became pregnant and gave birth to a daughter on 2 November 1938 at Psychiko Palace. Paul and Frederica wish to name their daughter, the future Queen Sofía of Spain, Olga, but Greek naming tradition required them to name the child Sophia after Paul's mother. On 2 June 1940, Frederica gave birth to an heir, the future Constantine II.

=== World War II ===
While Frederica was pregnant and giving birth to her three children, the last of which was Princess Irene, Nazi troops were gradually invading different countries throughout Europe, including France, which collapsed under the Nazi tactic of blitzkrieg. On 10 July 1940, Fascist Italy entered the war on the side of the Axis. Benito Mussolini launched a violent propaganda campaign against Greece and accused George of violating its neutrality by harbouring British ships within its waters. On 15 August 1940, an Italian submarine sunk the Elli, which was escorting pilgrims from Tinos. Germany offered mediation between Greece and Italy. It was agreed that if George were to abdicate and Paul become the monarch, Germany would prevent an Italian invasion of Greece. The deal also guaranteed Greek territorial gains in the Balkans. George was furious and made the Nazis write in response to Greece's actions: "They would do better not to stick their noses in the affairs of [his] country in they know what is good for them!" Germany continued attempting to put Paul on the throne.

On 28 October 1940, Mussolini sent Metaxas an ultimatum and demanded that he accepted within three hours while placing Italian troops in Italian-occupied Albania and in Greek Epirus. Metaxas refused and the Greco-Italian war commenced. Both the opposition, led by Plastiras, and the current government, pledged their support for George, who took charge of the Greek armed forces. Greece automatically joined the Allies and remained in close contact with their leaders. George held daily war council meetings at the Hotel Grande Bretagne, while Paul hosted communication links from each war front and continued his role in the navy from Athens. Greece successfully repelled Mussolini's invasion and occupied southern Albania.

Metaxas died on 29 January 1941. George refused to establish a national unity government and appointed the Governor of the National Bank of Greece, Alexandros Koryzis, as the new prime minister. This gave George an even worse reputation as his decision to inaugurate Koryzis continued the dictatorship established by Metaxas in 1936. George faced criticism not only in Greece but also by the Allies. After several victories in Albania, Greek forces capitulated in the German invasion of Greece, which proceeded the German invasion of Yugoslavia. The Luftwaffe' launched Operation Retribution, which saw the German army invading Yugoslavia after their refusal to join the Axis. The German annexation of Yugoslavia put Axis troops on the Greek border. Greek soldiers, accompanied by a regiment sent by London, were overwhelmed in Macedonia and Thessaloniki was captured on 9 April. The Metaxas Line was also crossed by Axis soldiers the same day. By mid-April, Koryzis asked George to accept capitulation, but George refused to compromise with enemy forces. On 18 April, Koryzis committed suicide, and Emmanouil Tsouderos took office three days after.

Fearful of their impending arrests, Paul, George, other members of the royal family, and some government officials agreed to flee the mainland and land in Crete on 9 April. The island however was very underfortified and under heavy attacks from the Luftwaffe. George asked the British government if they could stay in British Cyprus, alongside the cabinet and some 50,000 Greek soldiers. By 22 April, almost everyone but Paul and George had left Athens. George and Paul set up a temporary headquarters in Chania with their cousin, Prince Peter. George was given the title of "Number 1 enemy of the Reich in Greece" by Hitler and all three royals were forced to evacuate the island when the Fallschirmjäger commenced an attack. Paul, George and Peter narrowly escaped the Fallschirmjäger by taking the British ship HMS Decoy from Sfakia to Alexandria, where the rest of the royal family had fled to.

In Alexandria, the Greek diaspora of Egypt welcomed Paul, George and members of the royal family with accommodation, clothing and money. The Axis government established in occupied Greece worried Farouk of Egypt, who had many pro-Italian ministers. Paul and the rest of the Greek royals were forced to find refuge in another nation. George VI denied them access to the United Kingdom as he opposed Frederica's entry into the country, worried that a descendant of Wilhelm II would cause a revolt against the British monarchy, which had German roots. After mediations, it was decided that Paul and George would stay in London, with other members of the family moving to South Africa, a British colony. Paul placed his wife and two young children in Cape Town and under the protection of Prime Minister Jan Smuts, before leaving for London. While there, Paul was unable to return for the birth of his third child, Irene, on 11 May 1942.

Per Hourmouzios, Paul felt sidelined from business and combat with his brother taking over any real duties left. Following many requests, Paul managed to gain authority to go to Cairo and join the Free Greek Forces in August 1942, wishing to help liberate Greece. However, there was growing republicanism in the Greek forces and thus George prohibited Paul from fighting in Greece. Frederica moved to Cairo to be with Paul in January 1944, while their children stayed in South Africa with Smuts until March. There, the royal couple connected with the Egyptian royal family, particularly Farida of Egypt and her children, who were of similar age to Paul.

Greece was slowly liberated through 1944 and most Greek exiles had the opportunity to return home, however, Paul and his family were forced to stay in Egypt due to the rise of republican opposition in Greece following the war. Under the guidance of Winston Churchill and Anthony Eden, George appointed Archbishop Damaskinos of Athens as regent of the country on 29 December 1944. However, Archbishop Damaskinos almost instantaneously formed government with a republican majority and placed Plastiras as Head of the Cabinet. George considered abdicating in favour of Paul, however ultimately remained as the monarch. Paul believed that if he were able to return to Greece, he could have acted as the regent and prevented a republican government. However, George ignored any calls from Paul. The 1946 Greek referendum was held and monarchists received 68.41% of the votes, which allowed members of the Greek royal family, including Paul and George, to return. Archbishop Damaskinos greeted them upon their return, after which the royals discovered that their palaces had been pillaged and ransacked, while the Greek Civil War between the monarchists and communists began to take place.

== Reign ==
=== Accession ===
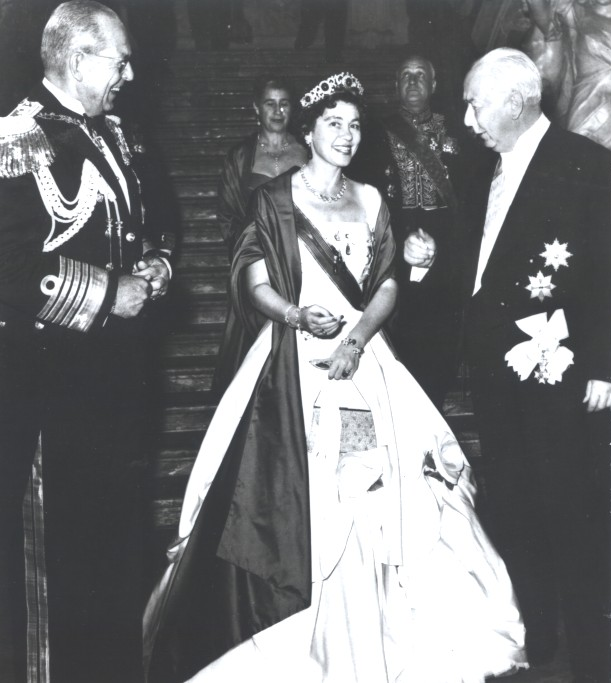
Paul (left) and Frederica (middle) with German President Theodor Heuss (right) in Germany in 1954

Paul succeeded to the throne on 1 April 1947 upon the death of his childless elder brother, George II, during the Greek Civil War. Paul and his family left their villa in Psychiko and moved to Tatoi after major work had been done to restore the palace. The family continuously moved between Tatoi and Psychiko due to building disruptions until 1949 when they moved in permanently. Paul and Frederica spoke English to each other and to their children despite being fluent in the Greek language. Paul frequently read, told stories and listened to classical music in the presence of his daughters, who later attended a boarding school in Salem to complete their education. The two girls were influenced by the teachings of Kurt Hahn, a Judo-German teacher whose ideas were commonly found as principles in royal families of German origin. Meanwhile, the new Crown Prince, Constantine, was sent by Paul and Frederica to the Anavryta Experimental Lyceum in Marousi.

Starting in 1947, Paul and Frederica took their children to Falken, Austria, for a skiing holiday every winter, and to Petalis in the summer, where the family was lent yachts. On these holidays, Frederica's German relatives were frequently invited, such as princes and princesses of the royal houses of Baden, Hesse, Hanover and Hohenlohe. In 1947, Paul was unable to attend the wedding of Prince Philip to the future Elizabeth II as he was suffering from typhoid fever. In addition to their German relatives, members of the Romanov dynasty who had not been murdered after the Russian Revolution were often welcomed at Tatoi. In June 1948, the wedding of Michael I of Romania and Anne of Bourbon-Parma was held in Athens.

During Paul's early reign, there was tension between certain members of the Greek royal family. Paul and his cousin, Peter, maintained a strained relationship after the royal family accused him of entering a misalliance by marrying Irina Ovtchinnikova, a divorced Russian commoner. Paul's aunt, Princess Alice of Battenberg, who was the mother of Prince Philip, regularly engaged in disagreements with Frederica, who she thought was clumsy and scared of her sister-in-law, Elena Vladimirovna of Russia.

=== Greek Civil War and Cyprus problem ===
Paul's contraction of typhoid fever immobilised him for several weeks and caused fears for his health, concurrent to the ongoing Greek Civil War, in which guerrilla warfare conducted by communists continued in the north of the country. Communists in Macedonia attempted to proclaim a people's republic. On Christmas Day 1947, communist militias initiated an attack on Konitsa, and Paul wished to walk through the frontlines but was unable to due to his health. Instead, Frederica held numerous talks between her and the fighting soldiers. At a point in time, Frederica herself travelled to the Epirus frontline, which, according to Hourmouzios, boosted her popularity and branded her a "strong and courageous woman".

On 15 October 1949, the communist forces retreated, which caused large celebrations within the army, also due to higher tensions in Soviet Union–Yugoslavia relations, which slowed support for the Greek communists. By the end of the civil war, around 158,000 people had been killed and approximately 100,000 to 200,000 civil war refugees were deported by Eastern Bloc nations. Thousands of Churches, schools, factories, and homes were destroyed or incapable of functioning. In response to these damages, Paul and Frederica created the Her Majesty's Fund foundation in 1947 to give financial aid to victims of the civil war.

In June 1952, Paul and Frederica made an official state visit to Turkey to ease Greco-Turkish relations. The Turkish government invited the couple to the Hagia Sophia, a Greek Orthodox Church that had been converted into a mosque and then to a museum, but they declined, instead only visiting the tomb of Mustafa Kemal. The state visit marked the first time a Greek head of state had made a state visit to Turkey, which had occupied Greece for over 400 years. This improved relations between the two nations. Paul also worked to facilitate Greco-Yugoslav relations by making a state visit to Belgrade in September 1955. The following year, Yugoslav President Josip Broz Tito and First Lady Jovanka Broz privately met Paul and Frederica in Corfu. Paul and Frederica also made state visits to the United Kingdom in 1952 and 1963, to the United States in 1953, to France and West Germany in 1956, to Switzerland in 1958, to Ethiopia and Italy in 1959, and to India and Thailand in 1963.

During his visit to the United Kingdom in 1952, Paul walked behind the coffin of George VI during his state funeral procession. Alongside Paul were members of the British royal family, Haakon VII of Norway, Frederik IX of Denmark, Gustaf VI Adolf of Sweden and President Vincent Auriol of France. Paul and Frederica also made trips to different regions of Greece. Every year on 21 February, the liberation day of Ioannina, on 26 October, the liberation day of Thessaloniki, and on 30 November, the liberation day of Patras and Saint Andrew's Day, Paul and Frederica would celebrate these regional festivities. Paul also habitually ensured that Greece's borders with its neighbours were secured. Paul also travelled to the destruction sites of natural disasters, such as the 1953 Ionian earthquake, 1955 Volos earthquake and 1956 Amorgos earthquake.

In order to promote the then barely developed tourism on the Greek islands, Paul and Frederica invited all ruling and former ruling European royal families to a cruise between the islands in 1954, for which the shipowner Pétros Nomikós made his passenger ship Agamemnon available. Over 100 guests took part in this 14-day voyage, which became known as the "Cruise of the Kings" and was repeated in 1956 on the ship Achilles between Athens and Corfu. Albrecht, Duke of Bavaria, and his family took part in these trips, which is why he decided to return to Paul the Greek crown jewels of the Wittelsbach king Otto of Greece, who had been deposed in 1862. Albrecht's son Prince Max presented these to Paul in December 1959. It had been almost a century since they were last in Greece.

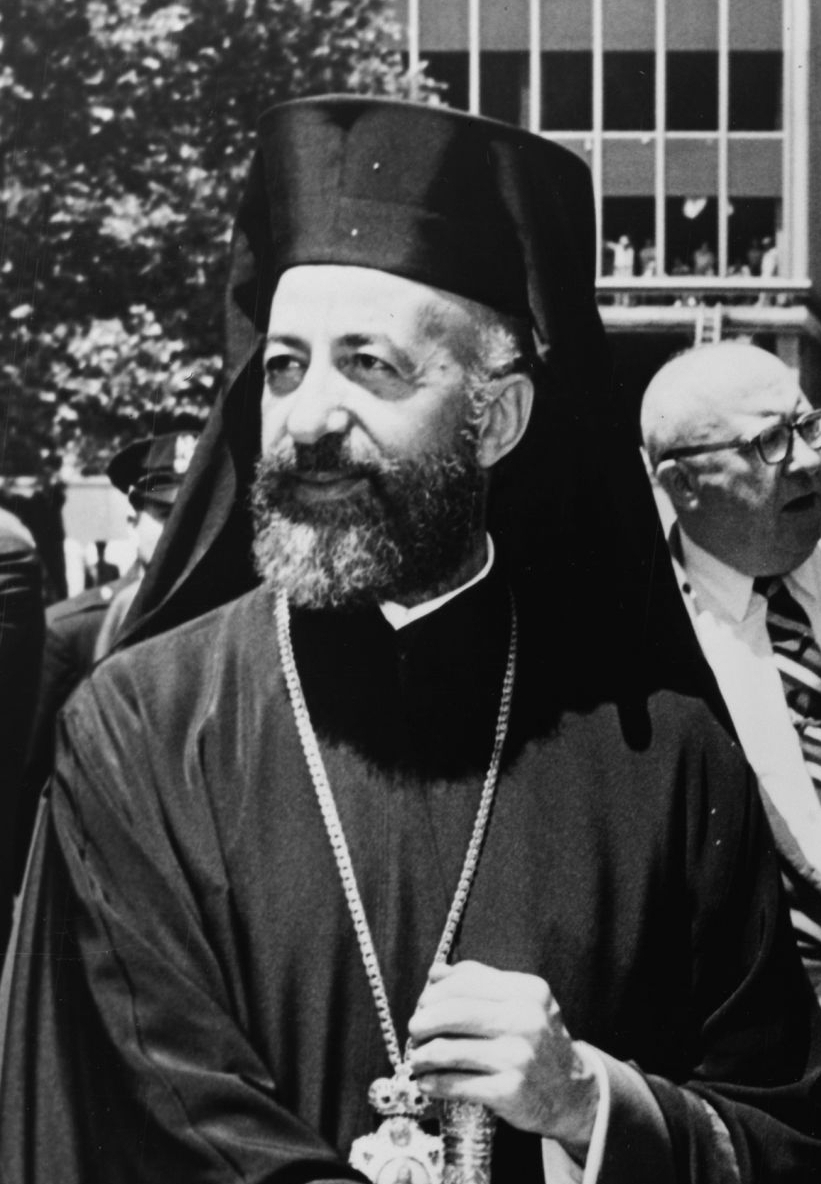
President of Cyprus, Archbishop Makarios III, worked closely with Paul to achieve enosis.

Earlier in 1948, the government of the United Kingdom announced its intentions to constitutionally reform their colony in Cyprus, an island inhabited by Greeks. Despite Greek visits to the United Kingdom, links with Britain became strained over Cyprus, where the majority Greek population favored union with Greece, which Britain, as the colonial power, would not endorse. The idea of a union between Greece and Cyprus became known as enosis. Archbishop Makarios III called for Cypriots to reject Britain's reforms and protest in favour of enosis. Paul released a public statement via The New York Times in which he declared his support for enosis. The Greek government had not been informed of Paul's plans to release his opinion and was initially stunted, but accepted the public's approval of Paul's support. Cyprus had been an issue of contention since the conclusion of the Greek Civil War and at George VI's funeral, Paul unsuccessfully attempted to host talks with the British government to achieve enosis. Paul additionally tried to prove to the British that Cyprus' fate should be determined by the native Cypriot inhabitants. During his visit to Turkey, Paul also initiated talks regarding enosis, which would affect the Turkish Cypriot minority on the island.

Greco-British relations were further strained when Archbishop Makarios III was greeted in Athens in 1953 and again in 1954. This led the British government to declare that enosis was "unthinkable" and drafted a new constitution for Cyprus. Greek Prime Minister Alexandros Papagos submitted a document outlining the issues of the Cyprus problem to the United Nations, while EOKA and General Georgios Grivas led an independence movement. The British government invited Greek and Turkish delegates to London for mediation talks on 29 August 1955. The talks only resulted in stiff relations between Greece, Turkey, and Britain. Paul and Greece's reputation in Turkey was then damaged by the Istanbul pogrom.

After the British government arrested Archbishop Makarios III and deported him to the Seychelles, anti-British sentiment in Greece grew as displayed through protests in some of Greece's largest cities. The Greek ambassador to London was subsequently dismissed from office. Paul made known his frustration with the situation and made speeches to the United Nations, calling for enosis. Archbishop Makarios III was released on 28 March 1957 as a result of pressure from American President Dwight D. Eisenhower, while there were numerous accounts of terrorism in Cyprus. The Turkish government then proposed Taksim, which would divide Cyprus between Greece and Turkey, however, both Greece and Paul opposed this idea. As violence between Greek Cypriots and Turkish Cypriots grew, the United Kingdom suggested that Cyprus become a shared Anglo-Greco-Turkish condominium, but Archbishop Makarios III and Paul rejected this as it went against the wishes of the Greek and Greek Cypriot population. On 10 September 1958, Paul made another speech, while in Switzerland, again declaring his support for enosis. In the United Kingdom, the press accused Paul of supporting the terrorism conducted by Greek Cypriot nationalists. On 5 February 1959, the London and Zürich Agreements established the resumption of real negotiations between Greece and Turkey, to the delight of Paul. Eventually, Cyprus became an independent state in 1960.

=== Economic miracle and growing authoritarianism ===
Greece was one of the first nations to benefit from the Marshall Plan and took advantage of American economic aid. Between 1948 and 1952, Greece received over US$376 million in financial aid from the United States. Economic growth was also due to growing political stability within Greece, something that Paul was greatly credited for. In eleven years, Greece was governed by only two prime ministers, Papagos and Konstantinos Karamanlis, a record for the past few decades. Alongside Wirtschaftswunder, agriculture, industry, mining and tourism boomed. The Greek drachma stabilised, while many Greeks moved into West Germany to send back large parts of their incomes. Economists, however, continued to worry about the fact that Greece's economy was very reliant on foreign loans and a majority of food consumed needed to be imported into the country. In addition, one-third of the national budget was spent on the military and defence.

Although written out as a constitutional monarchy, critics of Greece's politics claimed that the country contained traits of an authoritarian monarchy. The Greek constitution of 1952 granted extensive powers to the king, more than that of other European monarchs. Throughout Europe, Paul was subject to accusations of limiting democracy by the media, though both Van der Kriste and Hourmouzios state that many of these reports were exaggerated. The media used Paul's quick political stance to the Cyprus problem, his travel to Britain in 1963 despite the prime minister's recommendation and his close links with higher ranking staff in the Greek army as examples of these accusations. The cost of the monarchy was also questioned, and Paul and Frederica were accused of spending public funds for their own personal holidays and expensive lifestyle while having a lack of worry for the Greek public. The couple were also accused of taking money from Her Majesty's Fund for their personal use. One of the greatest critics of the monarchy was the leader of the opposition, Georgios Papandreou. Papandreou made the words in one of his speeches – "The king reigns, but does not govern" – his motto and boycotted several royal events.

In 1956 a minor controversy arose over a proposed increase to the Greek Civil List. By 1956 the King received 635,000 drachmae per month (7,620,000 annually, then worth approximately US $254,000) from the Civil list; from this he was expected to cover the costs of maintaining the Royal Palace in Athens and the Royal Yacht, as well as any private or official entertaining. The proposed increase for 1957 was 920,000 drachmae per month; despite earlier assurances that this would be supported by the Government and Opposition parties, in the minutes prior to the vote on the increase in the Greek Parliament the members of the Opposition departed the chamber. Although the vote on the increased passed, the King eventually informed Prime Minister Konstantinos Karamanlis that he could not accept this increase if it lacked the support of all major political parties.

=== Later reign ===
On 2 June 1958, Crown Prince Constantine turned 18 and thus commenced his royal duties. Constantine often shadowed Paul, who taught him the role of being the monarch. Paul was also very weary of the struggles he and his brother faced and wished to teach Constantine ways of avoiding the types of issues they experienced. Since the age of six, Constantine accompanied Paul in his sailing trips, and in December 1958, Paul and Frederica gifted him with his private sailboat. Constantine trained daily with Odysseus Eskitzoglou and Georgios Zaimis. With the support of Paul, the three enrolled to participate in the 1960 Summer Olympics. On 7 September 1960, they won a gold medal in the sailing event at the Olympics. It was marked with celebrations in Greece, being the second time Greece had won a gold medal in the Modern Olympics, the first being at the 1896 Summer Olympics and won by Spyridon Louis. Paul was also pleased with the wedding of his eldest daughter, Sofía, to Prince Juan Carlos of Spain, who was the heir to the Spanish throne. After having first met on the Cruise of the Kings, Sofía and Juan Carlos reunited at the Rome Olympics, where their relationship and future marriage was pathed.

In early 1963, Frederica was invited to attend the wedding of Princess Alexandra of Kent and Angus Ogilvy. Karamanlis persisted that she did not go to the wedding due to tensions between Athens and London over the Cyprus problem. Karamanlis feared that their attendance at the British royal wedding would create public uproar and opposition. However, Frederica did not listen to his advice and when she arrived in London, English tabloids released photos from the 1930s that showed Frederica and her brothers in the Hitler Youth uniform, describing her as a right-wing extremist with an iron fist. Protests against Frederica were held in the United Kingdom, however few were in Greece. Papandreou and his allies used it as an opportunity to claim that the lack of protests in Greece was because the monarchy had restricted freedom of speech, saying that Greece had committed "crimes". Communist Betty Ambatielos, whose husband had been imprisoned, organised violent demonstrations in London outside the hotel that Frederica was staying in. Frederica is forced to escape with members of the public who support her. The British government sent a "clumsy apology letter" to Paul, further damaging Greco-British relations.

On 22 May 1963, left-wing minister of parliament Grigoris Lambrakis was hit by a motorcycle in Thessaloniki and was killed. A later investigation discovered that the accident was a political attack and high-ranking government officials, who were closely associated with Paul and the monarchy, had been involved in its organisation. Although Paul's reputation was not as badly affected directly, Karamanlis' party, the National Radical Union, who was the monarchy's greatest supporter, was weakened in the public eye. Paul visited London two months later, which resulted in Karamanlis' resignation and Paul's greatest critic, Papandreou, formed government with his party following the 1964 Greek legislative election.

== Death ==
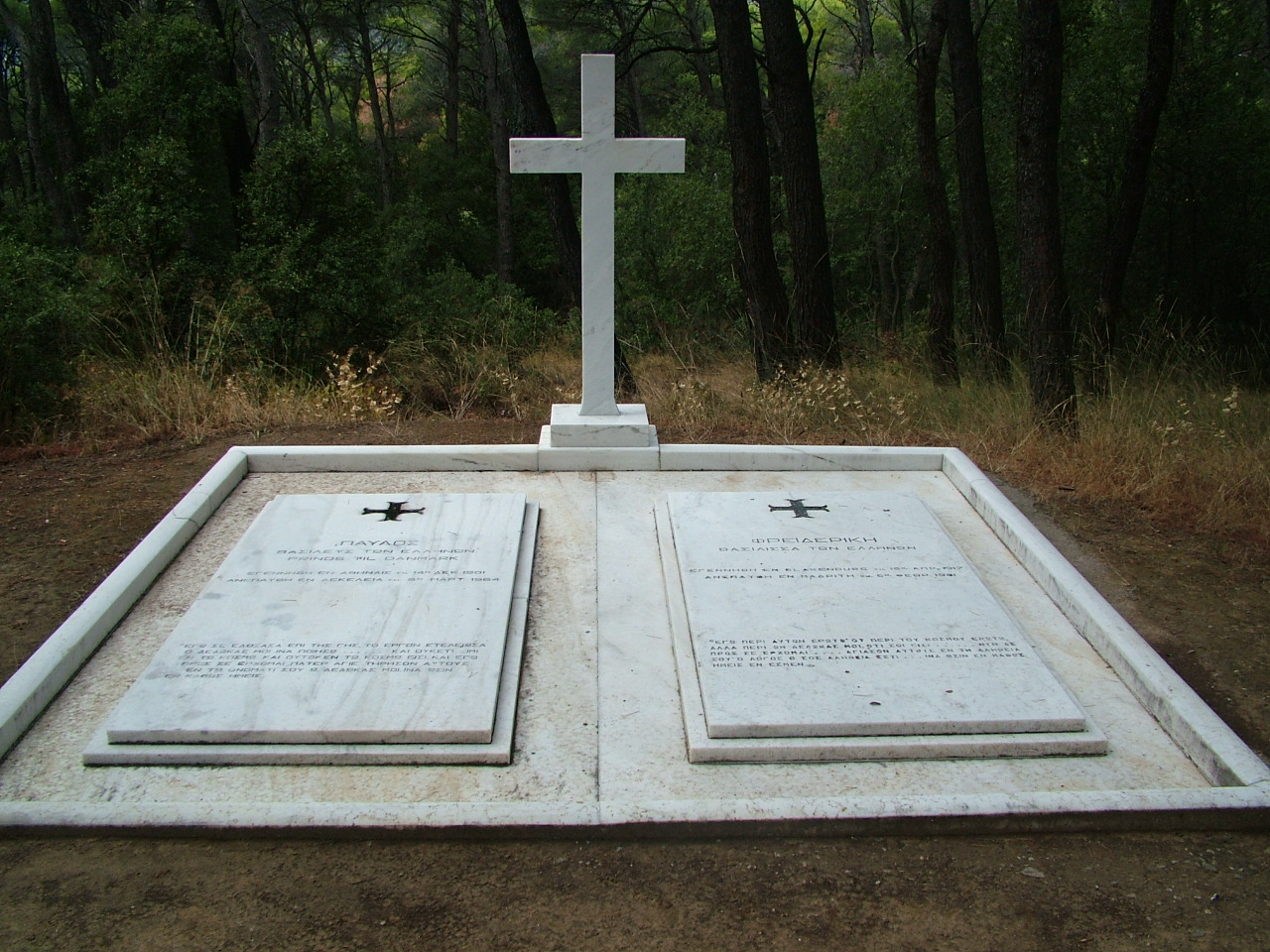
Paul and Frederica's tombs

For the last ten years of his life, Paul suffered from multiple health issues. He suffered from vision-related issues, so in 1959, he had an operation for a cataract, and in 1963 an emergency operation for appendicitis. However, later in January 1964, Paul was diagnosed with stomach cancer. Signs of his cancer began showing following his weakness after a trip to the United Kingdom. Paul fainted during the inauguration speech of Papandreou, which took place in February. Surgeons soon operated on a stomach ulcer but discovered that the cancer had grown substantially and ruled out any opportunity for recovery. Paul soon became medically restricted to Tatoi, where Frederica took care of him, while Constantine urgently travelled to Tinos to bring a holy icon. On 6 March 1964, at 16:12 (4:12 pm), after another surgery, Paul died at the age of 62.

Paul's funeral was held on 12 March 1964 and was attended by his family, as well as Prince Philip, Duke of Edinburgh, Umberto II of Italy, Infante Juan, Count of Barcelona, Gustaf VI Adolf of Sweden, American First Lady Bird Johnson, Simeon II of Bulgaria, Rainier III of Monaco and former American President Harry Truman. Paul was buried in the Tatoi gardens, where other deceased members of the Greek royal family are. Paul was succeeded by his son, who became King Constantine II. Paul's wife, Frederica, died 17 years later in 1981. In March 2014, a memorial service took place in the grounds of Tatoi Palace in Athens commemorating the fiftieth anniversary of Paul's death. Members of the Greek and Spanish royal families were present. In September 2020, Paul and Frederica's graves were minimally vandalised, but soon restored by the Greek government.

== In popular culture ==
=== Film and documentaries ===
Paul appears in various films and documentaries:

- In 2010, the role of Paul was portrayed by Spanish actor Roberto Álvarez in the television film Sofía, dedicated to the Paul's eldest daughter.
- His life is the focus of Pavlos: No Ordinary King, directed by Níkos Polítis (2014).
- Alongside his wife, he is the subject of the episode "Paul and Frederika" in the documentary series The Lovers of the Century by Frédéric Mitterrand (1993).
- He can also be seen in the Danish series En kongelig Familie (in English: A Royal family, directed by Anna Lerche and Marcus Mandal (2003).

=== Numismatics ===
Various coins featuring Paul were issued by the National Bank of Greece:

- A third installment of drachma coins was issued by Greece between 1954 and 1965, and featured Paul.
- A 30 drachmas silver coin was released in 1963 to commemorate the centenary of the Greek monarchy, depicting the portraits of George I, Constantine I, Alexander, George II, and Paul.

=== Philately ===
Various stamps featuring Paul were issued by the Hellenic Post:

- A series of three stamps printed in 1938, on the occasion of Paul's marriage to Frederica.
- A series of four stamps issued in 1952, commemorating Paul's 50th birthday.
- Four stamps showing the sovereign alone or accompanied by his wife and son, in the Kings of Greece A and B series printed in 1956 and 1957.
- Five stamps from the Centenary of the Hellenic Monarchy series issued in 1963, depicting the five monarchs of the House of Glücksburg.
- Ten stamps were released after the king's death in 1964.

== Honours ==
- Grand Star of the Decoration of Honour for Services to the Republic of Austria, 1956
- Knight of the Order of the Elephant of Denmark, 1927
- Collar of the Order of Solomon of Ethiopia, 1959
- Grand Cross of the Order of the Legion of Honour of France, 1956
- Knight of the Supreme Order of the Most Holy Annunciation of the Kingdom of Italy, 1935)
- Knight Grand Cross with Collar of the Order of Merit of the Italian Republic, 1952
- Knight Grand Cross of the Order of Saint Charles of Monaco, 1947
- Grand Cross of the Order of Carol I of the Kingdom of Romania
- Knight of the Order of the Golden Fleece of Spain, 1961
- Knight of the Order of the Rajamitrabhorn of Thailand, 1963
- United Kingdom:
  - Honorary Knight Grand Cross of the Royal Victorian Order, 1937
  - Associate Bailiff Grand Cross of the Most Venerable Order of the Hospital of Saint John of Jerusalem, 29 June 1948
  - Honorary Admiral Royal Navy, Feb 1953
  - Stranger Knight Companion of the Order of the Garter, 1963
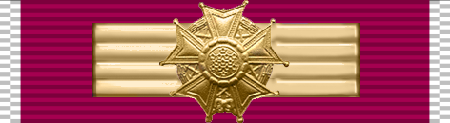
- Commander-in-Chief of the Legion of Merit of the United States, 1953
- Grand Cross of the Order of Merit of the Federal Republic of West Germany, 1954
- Order of the Yugoslav Star of the Socialist Federal Republic of Yugoslavia, 1954

== Marriage and issue ==
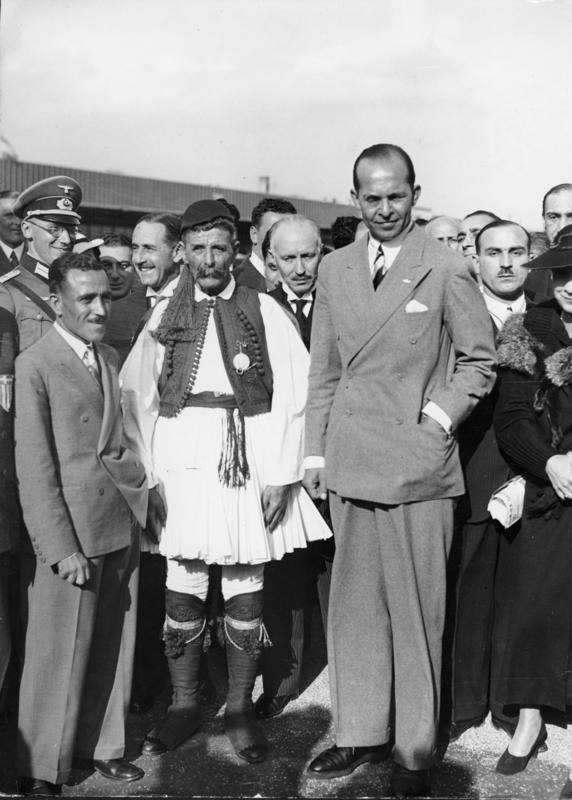
Paul of Greece with Spyridon Louis in Berlin, during the 1936 Summer Olympics.

On 9 January 1938, Paul married Princess Frederica of Hanover, his first cousin once removed through Frederick III, German Emperor, and Victoria, Princess Royal, and second cousin through Christian IX of Denmark, in Athens. They had three children.

Name	Birth	Death	Marriage		Children
Name	Birth	Death	Date	Spouse	Children
Queen Sofía of Spain	2 November 1938 (age 87)		14 May 1962	Juan Carlos I	Infanta Elena; Infanta Cristina; Felipe VI
Constantine II of Greece	2 June 1940	10 January 2023 (aged 82)	18 September 1964	Anne-Marie of Denmark	Princess Alexia; Pavlos, Crown Prince of Greece; Prince Nikolaos; Princess Theodora; Prince Philippos
Princess Irene	11 May 1942	15 January 2026 (aged 83)			

== Citations ==
Paul of Greece House of Schleswig-Holstein-Sonderburg-Glücksburg Cadet branch of the House of Oldenburg Born: 14 December 1901 Died: 6 March 1964
Regnal titles
Preceded by George II	King of the Hellenes; 1 April 1947 – 6 March 1964	Succeeded by Constantine II
