= Georgios Papandreou =

Prime minister of Greece (1888–1968)

- Γεώργιος Παπανδρέου
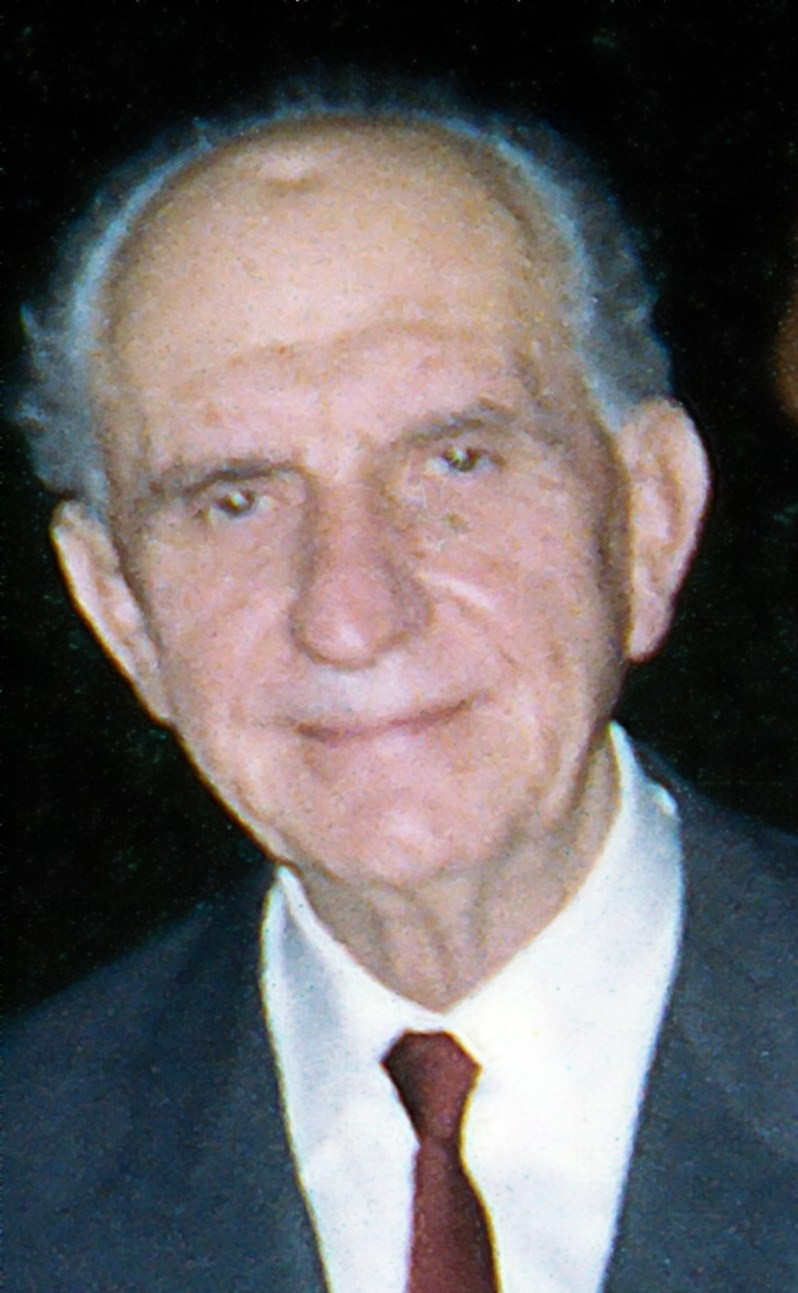
- Papandreou in 1964

Prime Minister of Greece
- In office 19 February 1964 – 15 July 1965
- Monarchs: Paul; Constantine II
- Regent: Crown Prince Constantine (until Mar 1964)
- Preceded by: Ioannis Paraskevopoulos
- Succeeded by: Georgios Athanasiadis-Novas
- In office 8 November 1963 – 30 December 1963
- Monarch: Paul
- Preceded by: Stylianos Mavromichalis
- Succeeded by: Ioannis Paraskevopoulos
- In office 26 April 1944 – 3 January 1945 (Note: In exile until October 1944)
- Monarch: George II
- Regent: Archbishop Damaskinos (from Dec 1944)
- Preceded by: Sofoklis Venizelos
- Succeeded by: Nikolaos Plastiras

Deputy Prime Minister of Greece
- In office 28 August 1950 – 4 July 1951
- Prime Minister: Sofoklis Venizelos
- Preceded by: Himself
- Succeeded by: Emmanouil Tsouderos
- In office 15 April 1950 – 21 August 1950
- Prime Minister: Nikolaos Plastiras
- Preceded by: Panagiotis Kanellopoulos
- Succeeded by: Himself

Minister of Education
- In office 18 February 1964 – 15 July 1965
- Prime Minister: Himself
- Preceded by: Georgios Kourmoulis
- Succeeded by: Georgios Athanasiadis-Novas
- In office 8 November 1963 – 30 December 1963
- Prime Minister: Himself
- Preceded by: Ioannis Sountis
- Succeeded by: Georgios Kourmoulis
- In office 1 February 1951 – 4 July 1951
- Prime Minister: Sofoklis Venizelos
- Preceded by: Nicholas Bakopoulos
- Succeeded by: Nicholas Bakopoulos
- In office 16 January 1933 – 6 March 1933
- Prime Minister: Eleftherios Venizelos
- Preceded by: Dimitrios Chatziskos
- Succeeded by: Alexandros Mazarakis-Ainian
- In office 2 January 1930 – 26 May 1932
- Prime Minister: Eleftherios Venizelos
- Preceded by: Konstantinos Gontikas
- Succeeded by: Pericles Karapanos

Personal details
- Born: Georgios Stavropoulos; 13 February 1888 Kalentzi, Achaea, Greece
- Died: 1 November 1968 (aged 80) Athens, Greece
- Party: Liberal Party (1914–1935); Democratic Party (1935–1936) the party ceased to exist due to the declaration of Metaxas' dictatorship; Democratic Socialist Party of Greece (1945–1953); Liberal Party (1953–1958); Centre Union (1961–1968)
- Spouse(s): Sofia Mineyko; Cybele Andrianou
- Children: Andreas Papandreou; Georgios G. Papandreou
- Relatives: George Papandreou (grandson); Nikos Papandreou (grandson)

Georgios Papandreou (Greek: Γεώργιος Παπανδρέου, Geórgios Papandréou; 13 February 1888 – 1 November 1968) was a Greek politician, the founder of the Papandreou political dynasty. He served three terms as the prime minister of Greece (1944–1945, 1963, 1964–1965). He was also deputy prime minister from 1950 to 1952, in the governments of Nikolaos Plastiras and Sofoklis Venizelos. He served numerous times as a cabinet minister, starting in 1923, in a political career that spanned more than five decades.

After studying law in Athens and political science in Berlin, Papandreou enlisted as a volunteer in the First Balkan War. He first ran for political office in the 1920 national elections and was a principal member of the 11 September 1922 Revolution that overthrew King Constantine I. Thereafter, he became a prominent Liberal politician, surviving an assassination attempt in 1921 and being imprisoned by Theodoros Pangalos's dictatorship in 1925. After having briefly attained ministerial experience at the start of the Second Republic, Eleftherios Venizelos elevated him to the ministries of Education and Transport in 1930 and 1933 respectively, overseeing the construction of over three thousand schools amidst the Greek refugee crisis. He was again arrested and exiled in 1938 by the 4th of August Regime, remaining in exile for four years.

Imprisoned by Italian forces in World War II during the Axis Occupation of Greece, he agreed to head the Greek government–in–exile in 1944. As German forces evacuated Greece in October 1944, Papandreou became the first post–occupation prime minister, heading a unity government and overseeing the suppression of communist EAM forces in Athens in the Dekemvriana. He resigned in early January 1945 and rose to becoming deputy leader of the Liberal Party under Sofoklis Venizelos. He would deputise both Venizelos and Nikolaos Plastiras as deputy prime minister before the Liberals lost the 1952 elections, resulting in the former relinquishing the party leadership to Papandreou. Despite winning the popular vote, the short–lived Democratic Union failed to win the 1956 elections. The merger of the Liberal Party and other parties in 1961 created the Centre Union that Papandreou led in that year's elections. Incumbent Konstantinos Karamanlis won the election, but Papandreou alleged fraud in the results, proclaiming a "relentless struggle" against the incumbent government.

The Centre Union won a minority vote in the 1963 elections and formed a government in the 1964 elections. On his return as head of government, he led economic liberalization efforts and wealth redistribution policies amidst the Greek economic miracle, increased mandatory years in education and enforced free education on all levels. In foreign policy, he assumed a pro–Enosis stance amidst clashes in Cyprus, and was increasingly advised by his son, Andreas Papandreou.

His relationship with the new King, Constantine II, was deteriorating, and following the refusal of Minister of National Defence Petros Garoufalias to vacate his position regarding the ASPIDA scandal in the army, Papandreou openly clashed with the King and resigned in July 1965. The latter lured in Centre Union members to form unelected coalition governments, resulting in prolonged political instability for the next two years. Papandreou denounced the "Apostates" of the Centre Union and declared a second "struggle", together with his son, Andreas. Before the 1967 elections could commence, a coup d'etat in April 1967 saw the installation of a military regime and the arrest of both Papandreous. Georgios was placed under house arrest and died in November 1968.

Papandreou was known as the "Old Man of Democracy" by his supporters. He established a political dynasty, that most prominently included his son Andreas, who would later serve as prime minister from 1981 to 1989 and 1993 to 1996, and grandson George, who served as prime minister from 2009 to 2011.

== Early life ==
Papandreou was born Georgios Stavropoulos at Kalentzi, in the Achaea region of the northern Peloponnese. He was the son of Father Andreas Stavropoulos, an Orthodox archpriest (protopresvyteros). His last name is derived from his father's Christian name and the word papas "priest". He studied law in Athens and political science in Berlin. His political philosophy was heavily influenced by German social democracy. As a result, he was adamantly opposed to the monarchy and supported generous social policies, but he was also extremely anti-communist (and specifically against the KKE's policies in Greece). As a young man, he became involved in politics as a supporter of the Liberal leader Eleftherios Venizelos, who made him governor of Chios after the Balkan Wars. One of his brothers, Nikos, was killed in the Battle of Kilkis-Lachanas.

He married twice. His first wife was Sofia Mineyko, a Polish national, daughter of Zygmunt Mineyko and paternal granddaughter of Stanisław Mineyko (1802–1857). Their son Andreas Papandreou was born in Chios in 1919. His second wife was the actress Cybele Andrianou and their son was named George Papandreou.

== Political career ==
During the political crisis surrounding Greece's entry into the First World War, Papandreou was one of Venizelos's closest supporters against the pro-German monarch, King Konstantínos I. When Venizelos in 1916 left Athens, Papandreou accompanied him to Crete, and then went to Lesbos, where he mobilised anti-monarchist supporters in the islands and rallied support for Venizelos's insurgent pro-Allied government in Thessaloniki.

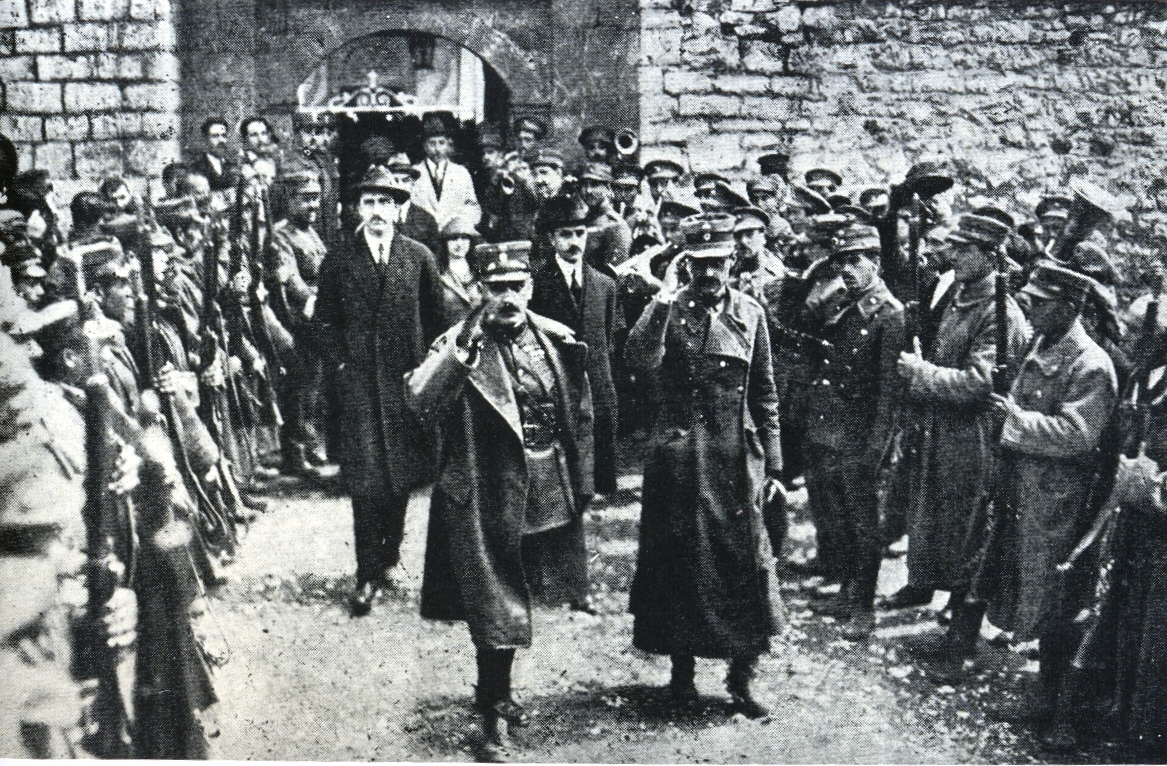
The leadership of the 1922 Revolution, Colonels Plastiras and Gonatas, with their political advisor, Geórgios Papandreou senior (left).

In the 1920 general election, Papandreou unsuccessfully ran as an independent liberal in the Lesbos constituency. In 1921 as a lawyer he defended Alexandros Papanastasiou, during a trial for his critic against King Konstantínos. Because of an article calling on King Konstantínos to abdicate, he was imprisoned by the royalist regime and later he narrowly escaped assassination from royalist extremists in Lesbos.

From January to October 1923, he served as interior minister in the cabinet of Stylianos Gonatas. In the December 1923 elections, he was elected as a Venizelist Liberal Party member of parliament for Lésvos, and served as finance minister for just 11 days in June 1925, education minister in 1930–1932 and transport minister in 1933. As minister of education he reformed the Greek school system and built many schools for the children of refugees of the Greco-Turkish War. During the dictatorship of Pangalos, he was again imprisoned.

In 1935, he set up the Democratic Socialist Party of Greece. The same year, a royalist coup by General Geórgios Kondylis took place for the re-establishment of monarchy and he was placed in internal exile. A lifelong opponent of the Greek monarchy, he was again exiled in 1938 by the Greek royalist dictator Ioannis Metaxas.

Following the Axis occupation of Greece in the Second World War, he was imprisoned by the Italian authorities. He later fled to the Middle East and joined the predominantly Venizelist government-in-exile based in the Kingdom of Egypt. With British support, King Geórgios II appointed him as prime minister, and under his premiership took place the Lebanon conference (May 1944) and later the Caserta Agreement (September 1944), in an attempt to stop the crisis in Greece and the conflicts between EAM and non-EAM forces (a prelude of the civil war) and establish a national unity government.

=== Liberation of Greece and the Dekemvrianá events ===
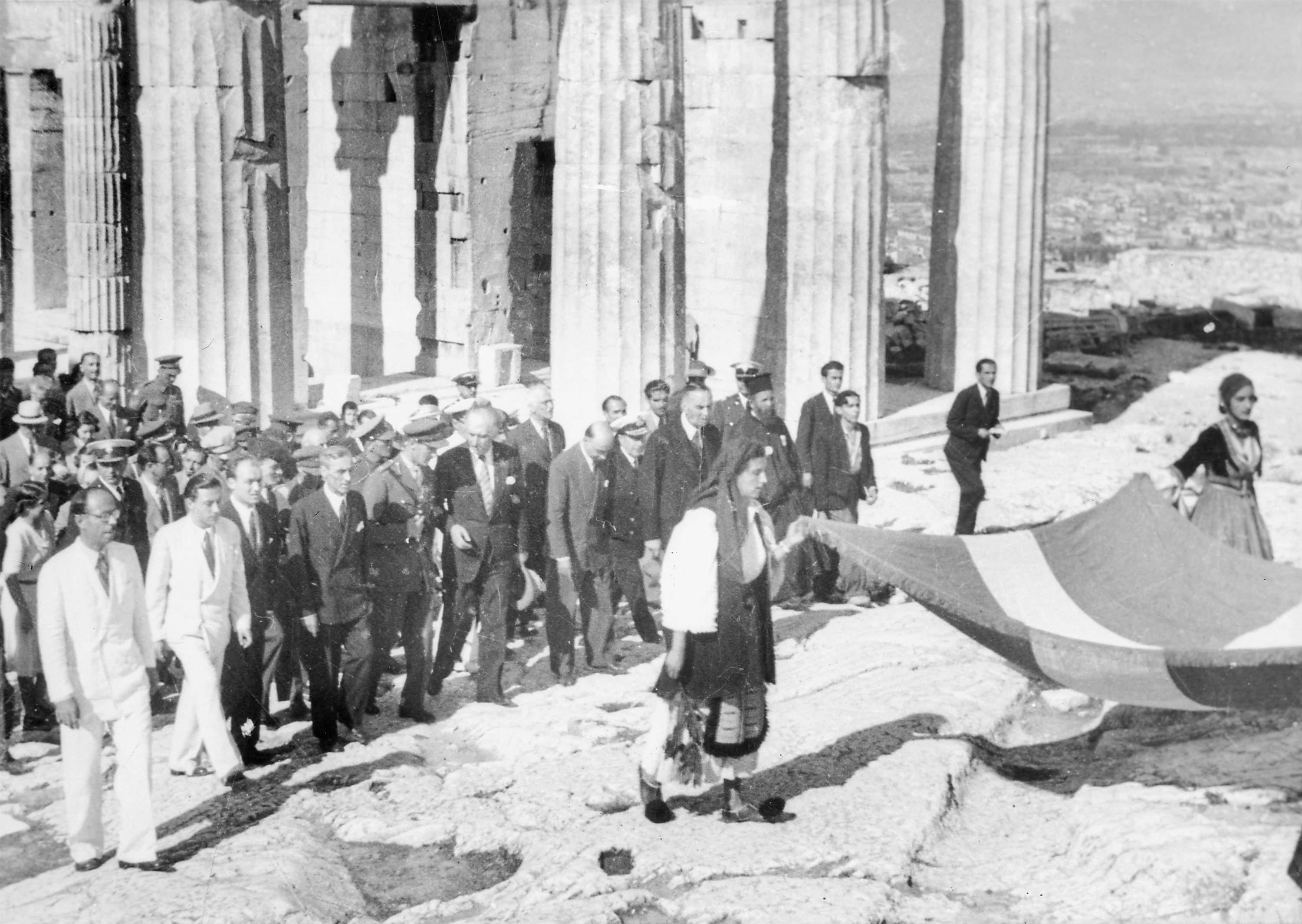
Geórgios Papandreou and others on the Acropolis of Athens, after the liberation from the Axis powers.

After the evacuation of Greece by the Axis powers, he entered Athens (October 1944) as Prime Minister of the Greek government-in-exile with some units of the Greek Army and the allied British. During the same month, he became prime minister in the Greek Government of National Unity, which had succeeded the Greek government-in-exile. He tried to normalise the highly polarised situation between the EAM and non-EAM forces, collaborating mainly with Lieutenant-General Sir Ronald Scobie, who was, after the Caserta agreement, responsible for all the Allied forces.

Although he resigned in 1945, after the Dekemvriana events, he continued to hold high office. From 1946–1952 he served as labour minister, supplies minister, education minister, finance minister and public order minister. In 1950–1952, he was also deputy prime minister.

The 1952–1961 period was a very difficult one for Papandreou. The liberal political forces in the Kingdom of Greece were gravely weakened by internal disputes and suffered electoral defeat from the conservatives. Papandreou continuously accused Sofoklis Venizelos for these maladies, considering his leadership dour and uninspiring.

=== Founder of the Centre Union and later confrontation with the Palace ===
In 1961, Papandreou revived Greek liberalism by founding the Centre Union Party, a confederation of old liberal Venizelists, social democrats and dissatisfied conservatives. After the elections of "violence and fraud" of 1961, Papandreou declared a "Relentless Struggle" against the right-wing ERE and the "parakrátos" (deep state) of the right.

Finally, his party won the elections of November 1963 and those of 1964, the second with a landslide majority. His progressive policies as premier aroused much opposition in conservative circles, as did the prominent role played by his son Andreas Papandreou, whose policies were seen as being considerably left of center. Andreas disagreed with his father on many important issues, and developed a network of political organizations, the "Democratic Leagues" (Dimokratikoi Syndesmoi) to lobby for more progressive policies. He also managed to take control of the Center Union's youth organization.

Papandreou had opposed the Zürich and London Agreement, which led to the foundation of the Republic of Cyprus. Following clashes between the Greek and Turkish communities, his government sent a Greek army division to the island.

King Constantine II openly opposed Papandreou's government, and there were frequent ultra-rightist plots in the Army, which destabilised the government. Finally, the King engineered a split in the Centre Union, and in July 1965, in a crisis known as Iouliana, he dismissed the government following a dispute over control of the Ministry of Defence.

After the April 1967 military coup by the Colonels' junta led by George Papadopoulos, Papandreou was arrested. He died under house arrest in November 1968. His funeral became the occasion for a massive anti-dictatorship demonstration. He is interred at the First Cemetery of Athens, alongside his son Andreas.

== Legacy ==
Papandreou was regarded as one of the best orators in the Greek political scene and a persistent fighter for Democracy. During the junta and after his death he was often referred to affectionately as "ο Γέρος της Δημοκρατίας" (o Géros tis Dimokratías, the old man of Democracy). Since his grandson George A. Papandreou entered politics, most Greek writers use Γεώργιος (Geórgios) to refer to the grandfather and the less formal Γιώργος (Giórgos) to refer to the grandson.

A wide range of progressive social reforms were also carried out during Papandreou’s premiership. Improvements in health and welfare were carried out, while general government transfers to households for education services rose by over 55%, and big increases in the enrollment of pupils in both secondary and higher education institutions took place. In addition, consumption per capita rose from 14,000 drachmae to 17,000 drachmae. Income distribution also improved as a result of his party’s income policy, which was geared towards increasing wage and agricultural income.

== Decorations and awards ==
In 1965, the University of Belgrade awarded him an honorary doctorate.

== Works ==
- The Liberation of Greece, Athens, 1945.

== See also ==
- Andreas Papandreou, his son
- George Papandreou, his grandson

== Notes ==
Political offices
Preceded by Sofoklis Venizelos	Prime Minister of Greece; 1944–1945	Succeeded by Nikolaos Plastiras
Preceded by Stylianos Mavromichalis	Prime Minister of Greece; 1963	Succeeded by Ioannis Paraskevopoulos
Preceded by Ioannis Paraskevopoulos	Prime Minister of Greece; 1964–1965	Succeeded by Georgios Athanasiadis-Novas
