= United Democratic Left =

United Democratic Left Ενιαία Δημοκρατική Αριστερά
- Leader: Ioannis Passalidis (first); Manolis Glezos (last)
- Founder: Ioannis Passalidis
- Founded: 1951
- Dissolved: 1993
- Preceded by: Democratic Alignment
- Merged into: Synaspismos
- Ideology: Democratic socialism Eurocommunism; Pacifism; Factions: Communism
- Political position: Left-wing; Factions: Far-left
- National affiliation: Liberal Democratic Union (1956); PAME (1961); United Left (1974); Symmachia (1977); PASOK (1980s)

The United Democratic Left (Greek: Ενιαία Δημοκρατική Αριστερά, ΕΔΑ; Eniéa Dimokratikí Aristerá, EDA) was a left-wing political party in Greece, active mostly before the Greek junta of 1967–1974.

== Foundation ==
The party was founded in July 1951 by prominent center-left and leftist politicians, some of which were former members of ELAS. While initially EDA was meant to act as a substitute and political front of the banned Communist Party of Greece, it eventually acquired a voice of its own, rather pluralistic and moderate. This development was more clearly shown at the time of the 1968 split in the ranks of Communist Party of Greece, with almost all former members of EDA joining the faction with Euro-communist, moderate tendencies.

== History ==
EDA participated in all the elections in Greece from 1952 until 1964. In the 1958 elections it managed to become the leading party of the opposition, an achievement all the more surprising in view of the recent end of the Greek Civil War and the consequently prevailing anti-Left politics at the time.

In the 1961 election and 1964 election, EDA indirectly supported the Center Union against the National Radical Union (NRU). Before the 1963 election, Greece entered a protracted period of political and social unrest, with the assassination of EDA MP Gregoris Lambrakis, providing further inflammation. EDA and the Center Union accused prime minister Constantine Karamanlis and the NRU of the murder, which resulted in more (sometimes violent) manifestations. Karamanlis denounced his accusers, and warned that they contributed to the political instability of the country. An independent judicial inquiry held under public prosecutor Christos Sartzetakis concluded that those responsible for the assassination were far-right extremists linked with rogue elements in the Greek security forces. However, no specific instructions from the ruling political leadership were identified, nor proven in the subsequent trial of the perpetrators.

== The party's end ==
With the advent of the dictatorship of 1967, the party was outlawed by the regime and its members were persecuted.

After the restoration of democracy, ΕDΑ reappeared in the elections of 1974 in an alliance with the Communist Party of Greece and the Communist Party of Greece (Interior), which were allowed to operate once again, and other leftist parties, under the leadership of Ilias Iliou, the most prominent politician of the Left in Greece at the time. Following a split in the alliance, ΕDΑ never participated independently in Greek politics again after 1977. Under the leadership of Manolis Glezos, the party took part in the elections of 1981 and 1985 in an alliance with and within the ranks of Panhellenic Socialist Movement (PASOK).

== Politicians of EDA ==
Well-known politicians of EDA were:

- Ioannis Passalidis, the most prominent of the EDA co-founders and leader of its group in the Parliament from 1951 until 1967.
- Gregoris Lambrakis
- Manolis Glezos
- Nicolas Kitsikis
- Mikis Theodorakis
- Ilias Iliou
- Stefanos Sarafis

== Electoral performance ==
| Election | Leader | Votes | % | Seats | Status |
|---|---|---|---|---|---|
| 1951 | Collective leadership | 180,640 | 10.6% | 10 / 258 | Fourth party |
| 1952 | Ioannis Passalidis | 152,011 | 9.5% | 0 / 300 | extraparliamentary |
| 1956 | Ioannis Passalidis | Part of the Democratic Union | | 19 / 300 | Fifth party |
| 1958 | Ioannis Passalidis | 939,902 | 24.4% | 79 / 300 | Main opposition party |
| 1961 | Ioannis Passalidis | Part of the All-Democratic Agricultural Front | | 22 / 300 | Third party |
| 1963 | Ioannis Passalidis | 669,297 | 14.3% | 28 / 300 | Third party |
| 1964 | Ioannis Passalidis | 542,865 | 11.8% | 22 / 300 | Third party |
1967–1974: banned
| 1974 | Ilias Iliou | Part of the United Left | | 1 / 300 | Minor opposition party |
| 1977 | Ilias Iliou | Part of the Progress and Left Forces Alliance | | 1 / 300 | Minor opposition party |
| 1981 | Manolis Glezos | Part of the Panhellenic Socialist Movement | | 1 / 300 | First part |

== See also ==
- History of modern Greece
