= Progressive Party (Greece) =

Progressive Party Κόμμα Προοδευτικών
- Founder: Spyros Markezinis
- Founded: 1955
- Dissolved: 1984
- Split from: Greek Rally
- Ideology: National conservatism National liberalism
- Political position: Right-wing

Progressive Party (Greek: Κόμμα Προοδευτικών, Komma Proodeftikon) is a former Greek conservative political party founded in 1954 by Spyros Markezinis. The party was formed after Spyros Markezinis broke away from the Greek Rally.

== History ==
Progressive Party gained 2.2% in the National Elections of 1956 earning no seats in the Parliament. It participated in the National Elections of 1958 as a part of a coalition called Democratic and Progressive Agricultural Union, earning two seats.

In the National Elections of 1961, Progressive Party participated with Centre Union earning fourteen seats. It gained 3.7% in the National Elections of 1963 and earned two seats. Its last appearance before the dictatorship was in the National Elections of 1964, participated with National Radical Union earning eight seats.

In the years of the Greek military junta of 1967–1974, the leader of the party, Spyros Markezinis, became prime minister during the attempt at democratization of the Greek military regime in 1973.

Spyros Markezinis reestablished the party in 1979 and participated in the National Elections of 1981, where it gained 1.7%. It also participated in the elections for the European Parliament in 1981, earning one seat in the European Parliament. Finally, the party gained 0.2% in the elections for the European Parliament in 1984 and it was dissolved shortly after.
