= Ioannis Passalidis =

Greek politician

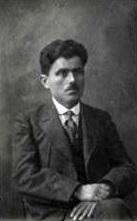
- Born: 1886; Kutaisi, Russian Empire (present-day Georgia)
- Died: 1968 (aged 81–82); Thessaloniki, Greece
- Education: University of Moscow; University of Odessa
- Occupations: Politician, doctor
- Known for: Founding the United Democratic Left party
- Office: Member of Parliament
- Political party: United Democratic Left

Ioannis Passalidis (Greek: Ιωάννης Πασαλίδης; 1886–1968) was a prominent member of the Greek Left and founder of the United Democratic Left party.

== Biography ==
He was born in the village of Kutaisi, Russian Empire, now in Georgia. He studied medicine at the universities of Moscow and Odessa. He graduated in 1910 and settled in the city of Sukhumi in the Caucasus. In 1913 he travelled in Germany for postgraduate studies. He then specialised as a surgeon in Odessa, taking the position of the director of the hospital of Sukhumi. After the declaration of independence of Georgia, he was elected a deputy with Noe Zhordania's Georgian Social Democratic Labour Party in the February 1919 general election.

In 1922, Passalidis settled in Thessaloniki and worked as a doctor. In the 1923 general election he was elected for the first time to the Greek Parliament as a republican deputy. In 1941 his party formed an alliance with the National Liberation Front (EAM) and, in 1945, he was elected in the central commission of EAM. In July 1951 he was the one who induced the formation of the United Democratic Left (EDA), which he led until 1967, when the colonels' regime persecuted its members.

Passalidis took part in all the Greek legislative elections from 1952 to 1964 as the leader of the United Democratic Left, being among the protagonists of almost all the debates during this period in the parliament.

He was prosecuted and placed under house arrest by the 1967 junta. This worsened his health and he died in 1968 in Thessaloniki. He is still remembered fondly among Greek leftists, who still refer to him as "Barbayiannis" (uncle John).

== See also ==
- United Democratic Left
- History of Modern Greece
