= Panagiotis Kanellopoulos =

Greek politician (1902–1986)

- Παναγιώτης Κανελλόπουλος
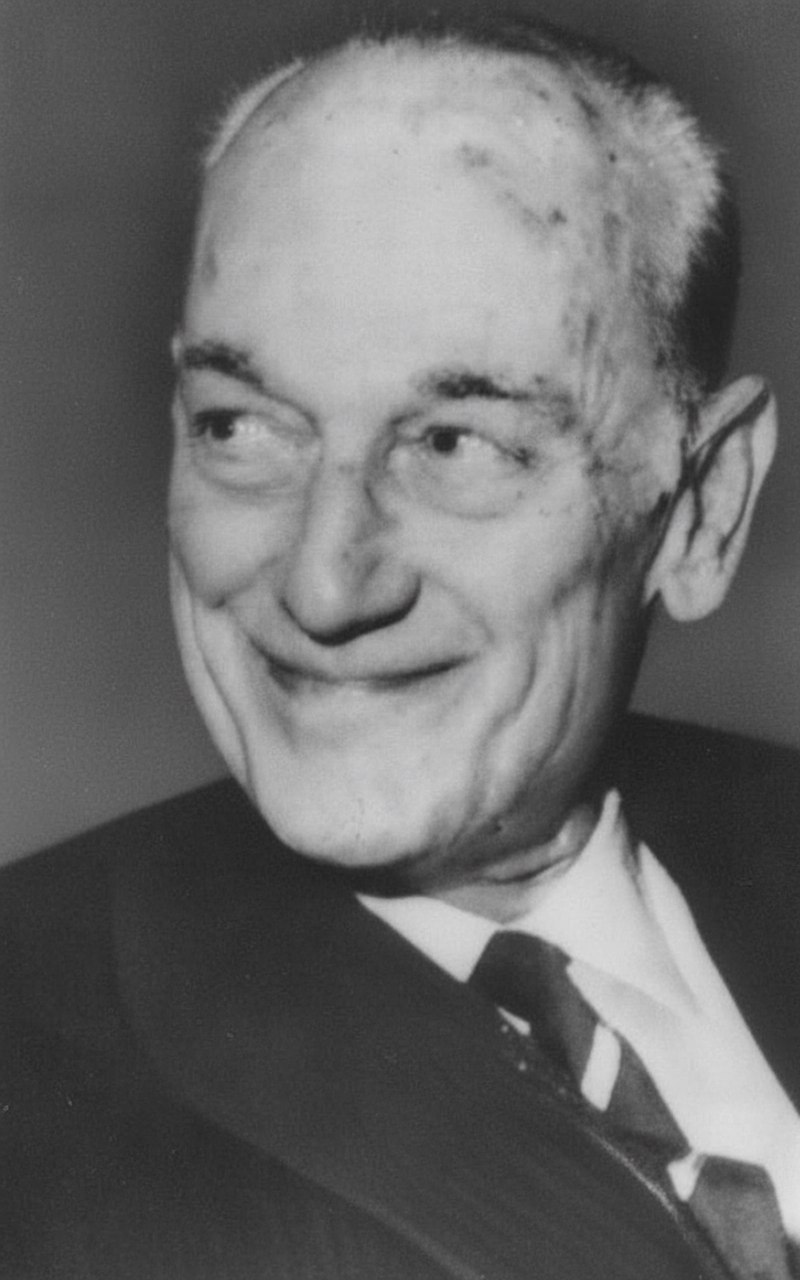
- Kanellopoulos in 1967

Prime Minister of Greece
- In office 3 April 1967 – 21 April 1967
- Monarch: Constantine II
- Preceded by: Ioannis Paraskevopoulos
- Succeeded by: Konstantinos Kollias
- In office 1 November 1945 – 22 November 1945
- Monarch: George II
- Regent: Archbishop Damaskinos
- Preceded by: Archbishop Damaskinos
- Succeeded by: Themistoklis Sofoulis

Personal details
- Born: 13 December 1902 Patras, Greece
- Died: 11 September 1986 (aged 83) Athens, Greece
- Party: National Radical Union

Panagiotis Kanellopoulos or Panayotis Kanellopoulos (Greek: Παναγιώτης Κανελλόπουλος; 13 December 1902 – 11 September 1986) was a Greek writer, politician and Prime Minister of Greece. He was the Prime Minister of Greece deposed by the Greek military junta of 1967–1974.

== Biography ==
Kanellopoulos was born in Patras and studied law in Athens, Heidelberg and Munich. He was an intellectual and author of books about politics, law, sociology, philosophy, and history. His book "I was born in 1402" received a literary award from the Academy of Athens. He married Theano Poulikakou (Θεανώ Πουλικάκου).

After the start of the Axis occupation of Greece in 1941 he founded the Omiros resistance group, and in 1942 he fled to the Middle East, where he served as Minister of Defence under the Tsouderos government in exile during World War II. In November 1945, he served as prime minister for a short period of time. After the war he became Minister for Reconstruction under Georgios Papandreou in a national unity government. He also served in other ministerial posts under Alexandros Diomidis, Konstantinos Karamanlis and others till 1967 when he became prime minister.

On 9 July 1961, Panagiotis Kanellopoulos as Deputy Prime Minister in Konstantinos Karamanlis' government and German Vice-Chancellor Ludwig Erhard signed the protocols of Greece's Treaty of Association with the European Economic Community (EEC). The signing ceremony in Athens was attended by top government officials from the six-member group consisting of Germany, France, Italy, Belgium, Luxemburg and the Netherlands. The six member group was the early precursor of today's 27 member European Union. Economy Minister Aristidis Protopapadakis and Foreign Minister Evangelos Averoff were also present at the ceremony as well as Prime Minister Konstantinos Karamanlis.

His niece, Amalia married Karamanlis. In 1963 he succeeded Karamanlis as leader of the National Radical Union party (ERE).

He was the last Prime Minister (acting as a caretaker for the upcoming elections which were scheduled for 28 May) prior to the coup d'état of 21 April 1967. He was placed under house arrest for the next seven years. During the events leading to the metapolitefsi (the period of political transition following the fall of the military junta), Phaedon Gizikis actively considered giving Kanellopoulos the mandate to form a transitional government. After the metapolitefsi Kanellopoulos resumed his parliamentary career as a member of the New Democracy party. He declined offers to become President of Greece when the post was offered to him during the metapolitefsi.

Kanellopoulos was the nephew of Dimitrios Gounaris.

Political offices
Preceded by Archbishop Damaskinos	Prime Minister of Greece; 1945	Succeeded by Themistoklis Sophoulis
Preceded by Alexandros Papagos	Minister for National Defence; 1952–1955	Succeeded by Konstantinos Karamanlis
Preceded by Ioannis Paraskevopoulos	Prime Minister of Greece; Caretaker; 1967	Succeeded by Konstantinos Kollias
