= National Radical Union =

Defunct political party in Greece

National Radical Union Εθνική Ριζοσπαστική Ένωσις
- President: Konstantinos Karamanlis (1955–1963); Panagiotis Kanellopoulos (1963–1967)
- Founded: 1956
- Dissolved: 1974
- Preceded by: Greek Rally
- Succeeded by: New Democracy
- Ideology: Conservatism; Greek nationalism Anti-communism; Royalism
- Political position: Right-wing
- European affiliation: European Democratic Union (associate)
- Colours: Blue

The National Radical Union (Greek: Ἐθνικὴ Ῥιζοσπαστικὴ Ἕνωσις (ΕΡΕ), Ethnikī́ Rizospastikī́ Énōsis (ERE)) was a Greek political party formed in 1956 by Konstantinos Karamanlis, mostly out of the Greek Rally party.

== History ==
ERE was a conservative, right-wing party, which also had some prominent centrist members, such as:

- Panagiotis Kanellopoulos
- Konstantinos Tsatsos, president of the Greek Republic from 1975 to 1980.
- Evangelos Averoff, minister of foreign affairs in Karamanlis' governments (1955–1963) and leader of ND from 1981 to 1984.

Karamanlis resigned from the leadership of ERE in 1963 and was succeeded by Panagiotis Kanellopoulos. The cause of Karamanlis' resignation was the hotly contested elections of 1961 (known as elections of "violence and fraud"). According to official results, ERE won the elections. But the opposition Centre Union and United Democratic Left accused the government of Karamanlis of massive fraud, did not acknowledge the result, and Centre Union's leader George Papandreou organised massive demonstrations ("uncompromising struggle") and called for new elections. Karamanlis felt gravely insulted and resigned from the Premiership and the leadership of the party. New elections were held in 1963 where ERE lost, and a year later, in 1964 which the Centre Union won with the second highest percentage in Greek history, 54 percent of the vote.

Kanellopoulos remained leader of the party until 1967, when he formed a government which did not last more than a month, as it was overthrown by the Greek military junta of 1967–1974. After 1967 ERE, like all political parties, was outlawed. It was never refounded. Karamanlis formed a new party in 1974, New Democracy, which he himself described as being somewhat more moderate than the ERE.

== Electoral history ==
=== Hellenic Parliament elections ===
Hellenic Parliament
Election	Party Leader	Votes	%	Seats	+/–	Position	Government
1956	Konstantinos Karamanlis	1,594,112	47.4%	165 / 300	▼82	▲2nd	Government
1958	Konstantinos Karamanlis	1,583,885	41.2%	171 / 300	▲6	▲1st	Government
1961	Konstantinos Karamanlis	2,347,824	50.8%	176 / 300	▲5	1st	Government
1963	Konstantinos Karamanlis	1,837,377	39.4%	132 / 300	▼44	▼2nd	Opposition
1964	Panagiotis Kanellopoulos	1,621,546	35.3%	107 / 300	▼27	2nd	Opposition
