= List of foreign ministers of Greece =

This is a list of foreign ministers of Greece.

== Kingdom of Greece (1833–1924) ==
Name	Took office	Left office	Party
Stefanos Skouloudis	18 April 1897	21 September 1897	New Party (1873)
Athos Romanos	14 April 1899	24 November 1901	
Alexandros Zaimis	25 November 1901	6 December 1902	
Alexandros Skouzes	7 December 1902	27 June 1903	
Georgios Theotokis	28 June 1903	11 July 1903	Nationalist Party
Dimitrios Rallis	11 July 1903	19 December 1903	Nationalist Party
Athos Romanos	19 December 1903	29 December 1904	
Alexandros Skouzes	29 December 1904	21 June 1905	
Dimitrios Rallis	25 June 1905	21 December 1905	Nationalist Party
Alexandros Skouzes	21 December 1905	21 June 1908	
Georgios Baltatzis	5 July 1908	20 July 1909	
Georgios Christakis-Zografos	29 July 1909	28 August 1909	
Kyriakoulis Mavromichalis	29 August 1909	31 January 1910	Nationalist Party
Dimitrios Kallergis	31 January 1910	18 October 1910	
Ioannis Gryparis	18 October 1910	17 August 1912	
Lambros Koromilas	30 August 1912	28 August 1913	
Dimitrios Panas	31 August 1913	22 December 1913	
Georgios Streit	3 January 1914	30 August 1914	
Eleftherios Venizelos	30 August 1914	25 February 1915	Liberal Party
Georgios Christakis-Zografos	9 April 1915	3 July 1915	
Dimitrios Gounaris	16 July 1915	10 August 1915	
Eleftherios Venizelos	23 August 1915	7 October 1915	Liberal Party
Alexandros Zaimis	7 October 1915	7 November 1915	Third Party
Stephanos Skouloudis	7 November 1915	22 June 1916	
Alexandros Zaimis	22 June 1916	16 September 1916	Third Party
Alexandros Karapanos	16 September 1916	9 October 1916	
Evgenios Zalokostas	10 October 1916	21 April 1917	
Alexandros Zaimis	3 May 1917	27 June 1917	Third Party
Nikolaos Politis	27 June 1917	18 November 1920	
Dimitrios Rallis	18 November 1920	6 February 1921	People's Party
Nikolaos Kalogeropoulos	6 February 1921	8 April 1921	
Georgios Baltatzis	8 April 1921	19 March 1922	
Georgios Baltatzis	19 March 1922	16 May 1922	
Nikolaos Stratos	16 May 1922	22 May 1922	
Georgios Baltatzis	22 May 1922	8 September 1922	
Nikolaos Kalogeropoulos	10 September 1922	30 September 1922	
Alexandros Papanastasiou	12 March 1924	29 March 1924	

== Second Hellenic Republic (1924–1935) ==
Name	Took office	Left office	Party
Georgios Roussos	2 April 1924	18 June 1924	
Konstantinos Rendis	18 June 1924	24 July 1924	
Georgios Roussos	24 July 1924	6 October 1924	
Andreas Michalakopoulos	7 October 1924	26 June 1925	Liberal Party
Alexandros Hatzikyriakos	26 June 1925	3 July 1925	
Konstantinos Rendis	3 July 1925	21 October 1925	
Alexandros Hatzikyriakos	21 October 1925	8 November 1925	
Loukas Kanakaris-Roufos	8 November 1925	23 August 1926	
Perikles Argyropoulos	26 August 1926	4 December 1926	
Andreas Michalakopoulos	4 December 1926	4 July 1928	Liberal Party
Alexandros Karapanos	4 July 1928	7 June 1929	
Perikles Argyropoulos	7 June 1929	4 July 1928	
Andreas Michalakopoulos	5 July 1929	26 May 1932	Liberal Party
Alexandros Papanastasiou	26 May 1932	2 June 1932	Liberal Party
Andreas Michalakopoulos	5 June 1932	31 October 1932	Liberal Party
Ioannis Rallis	3 November 1932	16 January 1933	
Andreas Michalakopoulos	16 January 1933	6 March 1933	Liberal Party
Nikolaos Mavroudis	7 March 1933	10 March 1933	
Dimitrios Maximos	10 March 1933	3 March 1935	
Panagis Tsaldaris	3 March 1935	27 March 1935	People's Party
Dimitrios Maximos	27 March 1935	1 April 1935	
Panagis Tsaldaris	1 April 1935	12 July 1935	People's Party
Dimitrios Maximos	13 July 1935	10 October 1935	
Ioannis Theotokis	10 October 1935	25 November 1935	People's Party

== Kingdom of Greece (1935–1967) ==
Name	Took office	Left office	Party
Konstantinos Demertzis	30 November 1935	12 April 1936	
Ioannis Metaxas	13 April 1936	27 January 1941	Freethinker's Party
Alexandros Koryzis	29 January 1941	18 April 1941	
Emmanouil Tsouderos	21 April 1941	29 April 1941	
George Papandreou	26 April 1944	29 April 1944	
Ioannis Sofianopoulos	3 January 1945	24 July 1945	
Petros Voulgaris	11 August 1945	19 August 1945	
Ioannis Politis	19 August 1945	9 October 1945	
Panagiotis Kanellopoulos	1 November 1945	20 November 1945	National Unionist Party
Ioannis Sofianopoulos	21 November 1945	29 January 1946	
Konstantinos Rendis	29 January 1946	1 April 1946	
Konstantinos Tsaldaris	4 April 1946	5 January 1950	People's Party
Panagiotis Pipinelis	7 January 1950	22 March 1950	
Sofoklis Venizelos	23 March 1950	7 April 1950	Liberal Party
Nikolaos Plastiras	15 April 1950	17 August 1950	National Progressive Center Union
Sofoklis Venizelos	21 August 1950	8 August 1951	Liberal Party
Ioannis Politis	8 August 1951	27 October 1951	Non-party
Sofoklis Venizelos	27 October 1951	10 October 1952	Liberal Party
Philippos Dragoumis	11 October 1952	18 November 1952	
Stefanos Stefanopoulos	23 November 1952	6 October 1955	Hellenic Union
Spyros Theotokis	6 October 1955	23 April 1956	Hellenic Union
Evangelos Averoff	27 May 1956	2 March 1958	National Radical Union
Michail Pesmazoglou	5 March 1958	17 May 1958	National Radical Union
Evangelos Averoff	17 May 1958	20 September 1961	National Radical Union
Michail Pesmazoglou	20 September 1961	4 November 1961	National Radical Union
Evangelos Averoff	4 November 1961	11 June 1963	National Radical Union
Panagiotis Pipinelis	19 June 1963	28 September 1963	
Pavlos Oikonomou-Gouras	29 September 1963	6 November 1963	
Sofoklis Venizelos	8 November 1963	24 December 1963	Center Union
Christos Xanthopoulos-Palamas	31 December 1963	18 February 1964	
Stavros Kostopoulos	18 February 1964	15 July 1965	Center Union
Georgios Melas	15 July 1965	5 August 1965	Center Union
Ilias Tsirimokos	20 August 1965	11 April 1966	Dissident Center Union; Liberal Democratic Center
Stefanos Stefanopoulos	12 April 1966	11 May 1966	Liberal Democratic Center
Ioannis Toumbas	11 May 1966	21 December 1966	Liberal Democratic Center
Pavlos Oikonomou-Gouras	22 December 1966	2 November 1967	

== Greek Military Junta (1967–1974) ==
Name	Took office	Left office	Party
Konstantinos Kollias	2 November 1967	20 November 1967	
Panagiotis Pipinelis	20 November 1967	20 July 1970	
Georgios Papadopoulos	21 July 1970	8 October 1973	
Christos Xanthopoulos-Palamas	8 October 1973	25 November 1973	
Spyridon Tetenes	25 November 1973	8 July 1974	

== Third Hellenic Republic (since 1974) ==
Name	Took office	Left office	Party	Notes
Konstantinos Kypraios	8 July 1974	24 July 1974		
Georgios Mavros	26 July 1974	15 October 1974	Center Union	
Dimitrios Bitsios	15 October 1974	28 November 1977	National Radical Union	
Panagiotis Papaligouras	28 November 1977	10 May 1978	New Democracy	
Georgios Rallis	10 May 1978	9 May 1980	New Democracy	
Konstantinos Mitsotakis	10 May 1980	19 October 1981	New Democracy	
Ioannis Charalambopoulos	21 October 1981	26 July 1985	Panhellenic Socialist Movement	
Karolos Papoulias	26 July 1985	1 July 1989	Panhellenic Socialist Movement	
Georgios Papoulias	12 October 1989	23 November 1989		
Antonis Samaras	23 November 1989	14 April 1992	New Democracy	
Konstantinos Mitsotakis	14 April 1992	7 August 1992	New Democracy	
Michalis Papakonstantinou	7 August 1992	13 October 1993	New Democracy	
Karolos Papoulias	13 October 1993	22 January 1996	Panhellenic Socialist Movement	
Theodoros Pangalos	22 January 1996	18 February 1999	Panhellenic Socialist Movement	
George Papandreou	19 February 1999	13 February 2004	Panhellenic Socialist Movement	
Anastasios Giannitsis	13 February 2004	10 March 2004	Panhellenic Socialist Movement	
Petros Molyviatis	10 March 2004	15 February 2006	New Democracy	
Dora Bakoyannis	15 February 2006	7 October 2009	New Democracy	
George Papandreou	7 October 2009	7 September 2010	Panhellenic Socialist Movement	
Dimitris Droutsas	7 September 2010	17 June 2011	Panhellenic Socialist Movement	
Stavros Lambrinidis	17 June 2011	11 November 2011	Panhellenic Socialist Movement	
Stavros Dimas	11 November 2011	17 May 2012	New Democracy	
Petros Molyviatis (2nd term)	17 May 2012	21 June 2012	New Democracy	Caretaker Cabinet of Panagiotis Pikrammenos
Dimitris Avramopoulos	21 June 2012	25 June 2013	New Democracy	Coalition Cabinet of Antonis Samaras
Evangelos Venizelos	25 June 2013	27 January 2015	Panhellenic Socialist Movement	Coalition Cabinet of Antonis Samaras
Nikos Kotzias	27 January 2015	28 August 2015	Independent	First Cabinet of Alexis Tsipras
Petros Molyviatis (3rd term)	28 August 2015	23 September 2015	New Democracy	Caretaker Cabinet of Vassiliki Thanou-Christophilou
Nikos Kotzias (2nd term)	23 September 2015	20 October 2018	Coalition of the Radical Left	Second Cabinet of Alexis Tsipras
Alexis Tsipras	20 October 2018	15 February 2019	Coalition of the Radical Left	Second Cabinet of Alexis Tsipras
Georgios Katrougalos	15 February 2019	8 July 2019	Coalition of the Radical Left	Second Cabinet of Alexis Tsipras
Nikos Dendias	9 July 2019	25 May 2023	New Democracy	Cabinet of Kyriakos Mitsotakis
Vassilis Kaskeralis	25 May 2023	27 June 2023	Independent	Caretaker Cabinet of Ioannis Sarmas
