= Ioannis Toumbas =

Greek naval officer and politician (1901–1995)

- Rear Admiral I. Toumbas in 1950

Minister for Foreign Affairs
- In office 11 May 1966 – 22 December 1966

Minister for Industry
- In office 22 September 1965 – 11 May 1966

Minister for Public Works
- In office 20 August 1965 – 21 September 1965

Minister for the Interior and of Public Order
- In office 15 July 1965 – 20 August 1965

Minister for the Interior
- In office 19 February 1964 – 6 January 1965

Minister without Portfolio
- In office 8 November 1963 – 31 December 1963

Personal details
- Born: 24 February 1901 Mykonos
- Died: 7 May 1995 (aged 94) Athens
- Party: Centre Union
- Education: Hellenic Naval Academy
- Occupation: Naval officer

Ioannis Toumbas (Greek: Ιωάννης Τούμπας, 24 February 1901 – 7 May 1995) was a Greek naval officer and politician, best known for his command of the destroyer Adrias during World War II. He also served in several ministerial positions in the 1960s and became a member and chairman of the Academy of Athens.

== Military career ==
He was born in Mykonos in 1901, and graduated from the Hellenic Naval Academy in 1921. Due to his participation in the Venizelist coup d'état attempt in March 1935, he was dismissed from the service, but was recalled on the outbreak of the Greco-Italian War in October 1940. He served as commander of the Karaburun Naval Fort until the German invasion of Greece in April 1941. Fleeing to the Middle East, he continued to serve in the exiled Greek Armed forces, assuming command of the destroyer Aetos in 1941–1942.

On 20 July 1942, he assumed command of the Adrias, a Hunt-class destroyer, at Newcastle, United Kingdom. With her, he undertook convoy escort duties in the Mediterranean Sea from January 1943, during which the ship sunk two German U-boats. Adrias also covered the Sicily landings in July, and on 10 September she represented Greece in the Allied flotilla that accepted the surrender of the Italian Navy's battle-fleet. Toumbas' finest hour came on 22 October 1943, during the naval operations of the Dodecanese Campaign, when Adrias struck a sea mine and lost her entire bow. After makeshift repairs, Toumbas led the ship back to Egypt, arriving at Alexandria on 6 December. In April 1944, he took part in the violent suppression of the pro-leftist Navy mutiny, leading one of the boarding detachments.

Following the liberation of Greece in October 1944, he served as chief of staff of the Fleet and CO of the Destroyer Squadron, until he assumed command of the Salamis Naval Base in 1945. In 1946 he was appointed as chief of the Coastal Forces Command, and in 1947 he was sent to Washington, D.C., as a naval attaché. Promoted to Rear Admiral in 1950, he assumed the post of chief of the Aegean Naval Command, and served as Chief of the Fleet Command in 1952–1953. He resigned in 1953, retiring as a vice admiral.

== Political career ==
Toumbas became involved in politics in 1955, initially with the Liberal Democratic Union of Sofoklis Venizelos, and subsequently with the Liberal Party and the Centre Union of Georgios Papandreou, whose close associate he became. He was elected a member of the Greek Parliament in all elections from 1956 to 1964 (in 1956 with the LDU). He was named Minister without Portfolio in Papandreou's first cabinet in winter 1963, and Minister for the Interior in his second cabinet, from February 1964 to January 1965, when he resigned.

An honest, but politically rather naive and deeply conservative man, he joined all three palace-appointed cabinets during the "Iouliana" crisis of 1965–1966. He served as Interior and Public Order Minister under Georgios Athanasiadis-Novas, Minister for Public Works in the Ilias Tsirimokos cabinet, a post he initially kept in the Stefanos Stefanopoulos government, before moving to the ministries of Industry and Northern Greece, finally becoming Foreign Minister in 1966.

He was politically inactive during the Greek military junta of 1967–1974, and after its fall he joined the right-wing New Democracy party, with which he was elected on the nationwide list in the 1974 elections. In 1979 he became a member of the Academy of Athens, and served as its president in 1991. He died in Athens on 7 May 1995.

== Writings ==
- Εχθρός εν όψει [Enemy in Sight], Athens 1954. Won the Academy of Athens prize.
- Από το ημερολόγιο ενός υπουργού [From the diary of a minister], Athens 1986.

Political offices
Preceded by –	Minister without Portfolio; 8 November – 31 December 1963	Succeeded by –
Preceded by Ioannis Paraskevopoulos (interim minister)	Minister for the Interior; 19 February 1964 – 6 January 1965	Succeeded by Ilias Tsirimokos
Preceded by Polychronis Polychronidis	Minister for Public Order; 15 July – 20 August 1965	Succeeded by Stelios Allamanis (pro tempore)
Preceded by Ilias Tsirimokos	Minister for the Interior; 16 July – 20 August 1965	Succeeded by Fokion Zaimis
Preceded by Athanasios Roussopoulos	Minister for Public Works; 20 August – 21 September 1965	Succeeded by Ioannis Glavanis
Preceded by Christos Avramidis under the Athanasiadis-Novas government	Minister for Northern Greece (pro tempore); 17 September – 5 October 1965	Succeeded by Theodoros Manolopoulos
Preceded by Georgios Athanasiadis-Novas (pro tempore)	Minister for Industry; 22 September 1965 – 11 May 1966	Succeeded by Ioannis Glavanis
Preceded by Stefanos Stefanopoulos	Minister for Foreign Affairs; 11 May – 22 December 1966	Succeeded by Pavlos Oikonomou-Gouras
Military offices
Preceded by Rear Admiral P. Lappas	Chief of the Fleet Command; 1952–1953	Succeeded by Rear Admiral K. Tsatsos
