= Skouzes =

Skouzes may refer to:

== People ==
- Alexandros Skouzes (1853–1937), Greek politician
- Dimitrios Skouzes (1890–1972), Greek writer
- Skouzes family, a leading family in Athens.

== Other uses ==
- Skouze Hill, hill in Athens
