= Ilias Iliou =

Greek lawyer and politician

- Born: May 1904; Myrina, Greece
- Died: 25 January 1985; Athens, Greece
- Occupation(s): Lawyer, politician

Ilias Iliou (Greek: Ηλίας Ηλιού; May 1904 – 25 January 1985) was a Greek lawyer and politician, member of the Greek Parliament and leader of the United Democratic Left (EDA). He was also a distinguished writer and jurist.

== Life ==
=== Early years ===
Iliou was born in 1904 in Kastro (now renamed Myrina), the main town of Lemnos. The island was part of the Ottoman Empire until 1912. His grandfather Ilias was a shoemaker originally from Macedonia, his father Philippos (d. 1927) a rich merchant who lost his fortune in 1929, and his mother Efthalia (d. 1916) a schoolteacher, rare for a woman at the time. He was the eldest of three brothers and one sister. The others were Yannis (b. 1906, died soon after), another Yannis (b. 1908), Konstantinos (b. 1910) and Eleni (b. 1912).

A brilliant pupil, he finished the gymnasium at the age of 16, studied law in the University of Athens, and graduated in 1924.

=== Before the Second World War ===
He started a legal practice in Mytilene with George Zoanos which continued in Athens after 1935. In addition to his legal work he also wrote poetry, was a translator from classical Greek and French of literary and legal books, contributing many articles to specialist law journals. He also wrote articles for literary magazines such as Noumas (Νουμάς), Philiki Etairia (Φιλική Εταιρεία), Ellinika Grammata (Ελληνικά Γράμματα) and Neoellinika Grammata (Νεοελληνικά Γράμματα), which broke new ground as they were written in the Demotic Greek (spoken, popular form of Greek) which was only officially recognized in 1975 instead of the usual more classical katharevousa.

During the Metaxas dictatorship (1936–41) he contributed two books in the series “Library of Writers and Poets of Ancient Greece” published by Zacharopoulos. After the war he wrote several more books and contributed many articles to journals and newspapers. In 1922 he joined the Democratic Union of Alexandros Papanastasiou and stood as a candidate in the Parliamentary elections of 1932 and 1936, without success. He moved to Athens in 1935 and in 1942 he was called to the bar of the Areios Pagos.

Iliou was always a supporter of liberal progressive causes. In 1935, during the dictatorship of General Metaxas, he was contacted by Joe Nordmann (b. 1910, a prominent lawyer who was a member of the French Communist Party and later of the International Association of Democratic Lawyers) and asked to send information about the persecution of anti-fascists in Greece.

=== Resistance and civil war ===
World War II broke out for Greece in 1940, and he joined the National Liberation Front (EAM) in 1942. When the Germans had been driven out, a conflict broke out between the left-wing Greek Resistance (EAM-ELAS) and the Greek Royalists assisted by British troops which were brought from Egypt in December 1944 (the Dekemvriana). Iliou’s house in Ambelokipoi was in the front line.

His son Philippos Iliou, 14 at the time, was a runner for EPON (United Panhellenic Organization of Youth) - one of those who, in the absence of phones radios and newspapers, formed the practical liaison between units and disseminated news about Athens. One day, British soldiers arrived at the house with an interpreter to arrest Philippos and Ilias. His father-in-law, Senator George Emmanuel Kaldis, happened to be there and was also arrested. They were brought to a warehouse in Kallithea which was used as a temporary prison.

The prisoners were then summoned one by one for interrogation. The procedure was that each would be asked what he had done through an interpreter. He would answer that he knew nothing, the interpreter would translate that as "I was involved with EAM", and the British would pack him off to Hassani airport, from which they were then sent to a prison camp in Libya. After a few people had been through this process, Ilias came forward and said "I am a lawyer and I wish to record that the translator is not doing his job properly". He was sent back to await his turn in the line and they were released after 3 days.

Free again, he became the defence lawyer of many of the members of the Resistance persecuted by the Royalist government. Offended by the gross injustices, he joined the Greek Communist Party (ΚΚΕ) as a protest in 1945.

During the Greek Civil War (1946–1950) he was arrested once more in March 1947. First, he was deported to Ikaria, then to the concentration camp of Makronisos, and finally to the little island of Agios Efstratios until November 1951. He would recount later how he had been ushered around the Aegean Sea to do some tourism "at the expense of the State".

=== Post-war political career ===
The EDA party (United Democratic Left) was created in 1951 to represent a broad front covering the parties on the Left, including the proscribed Communist Party. Iliou was one of the founders. In the elections of 1952 Iliou was one of the deported candidates who were elected. The government was forced to release them, but it immediately annulled their election. Iliou became an MP for EDA and was re-elected in all the general elections from 1956 to 1967. He was its parliamentary leader and later President.

In 1965 Colonel Georgios Papadopoulos arranged for the tanks of an army unit on the country's north-eastern frontier to be sabotaged, and announced this as Communist sabotage. This was used as a pretext for the immediate arrest, without any formal process, of a number of soldiers and civilians throughout the country. When this subterfuge was exposed, this was raised in Parliament by the Prime Minister George Papandreou. The speech by Iliou on that occasion was seen as prophetic:

“ ... How come there is a presumption that someone called Papadopoulos is telling the truth while dozens of free citizens are presumed to be guilty without evidence, that an order by Mr. Papadopoulos is enough for the arrest of ten citizens at home in the middle of the night and their imprisonment in total isolation, subject to the usual beatings and maltreatment, and that eventually it should be established that it was all a lot of hot air? And if tomorrow another order targets not 10 but 500, 1,000, 10,000 citizens, might it be possible that this country once more becomes home to a regime of fear, based on another arbitrary and malicious act by some Mr Papadopoulos?”

A cartoon by Bost in Avghi on 5 April 1964 shows Iliou and George Papandreou in a debate - this was turned into a painting which itself became a political prisoner later (see Bost for details).

Less than two years later, in April 1967, a military junta, led by Papadopoulos, seized power. Iliou was arrested again and after detention in the Hippodrome, where he was badly beaten, transferred once more to the revived concentration camp on Gioura. His health suffered and he was transferred under solitary confinement to the hospital of the Averof prison in Athens. In 1971 he was released, but had to report regularly to the nearest police station. He was often stopped in the street when he called his wife - her name Eleftheria meant freedom.

After the fall of the Junta in 1974, he was reelected to Parliament in 1974 with EDA and in 1977 with the Coalition of Left and Progressive Forces (Συμμαχία Αριστερών και Προοδευτικών Δυνάμεων) which included inter alia EDA and the two Communist parties that had come out of the Party schism of 1968. By this time he was one of the senior, longest-serving MPs and a popular public figure. In 1978 the coalition dissolved into its constituents and in 1981 he retired from politics.

Poet, lawyer and politician, recognized as a humanist, a non-dogmatic and objective progressive precursor of Eurocommunism, an eloquent orator with a sense of humour, often called the "Nestor of Greek politics", he was respected by his enemies as well. At his death in 1985 from complications of diabetes mellitus, he was granted a state funeral at the First Cemetery of Athens with the honours of a Minister. Many streets throughout Greece were renamed in his honour after his death.

=== Personal life ===
In 1930 he married Eleftheria Kaldis, daughter of Georgios Emmanouil Kaldis (1875–1953), MP for Lesbos and Lemnos, and they had 2 children: Philippos Iliou (historian, 1931–2004) and Mary Iliou Ciompi (b. 1934). His wife died in 2003.

== Writings ==
(All the publications below, which are a selection only, are in Greek and by I. Iliou. The titles have been translated from the original Greek)

1939: “Speeches by Aeschines” (translation and commentary I. Iliou), publisher Zacharopoulos.

1940: Ρητορική “Rhetoric” by Aristotle (introduction, translation, notes by I. Iliou), publisher Zacharopoulos (2 volumes). Republished by Kedros 1984 & 2002. ISBN 960-04-2114-5.

1953: “Public and private law”, Charles Eisenmann (Introduction and translation I. Iliou).

1958: “The youth of Greece”; I: Iliou (privately printed).

1960: “The program for national democratic reform” (Report to 1st National Congress of EDA, publisher EDA pp 93–104).

1960: “The national economy and the public finances in 1960” (General report on the budget of 1960), Greek national printing press.

1962: Presentation to “Reunion de Juristes d’Europe occidentale pour la restauration des libertes publiques en Grece, 26 mai 1962”, Edition de l’Association Internationale de Juristes, pp 8–19.

1962 “The truth on the Common Market”, printed by K. Koulouphakos.

1963: “The immediate demands of the people”, report to the 2nd Panhellenic Congress of EDA, official texts pp 84–124.

1966: “The socioeconomic basis and definition of political objectives”, in “Week of contemporary thoughts”, publisher Themelio pp 503–563.

1966: “The crisis of power”, publisher Themelio.

1973: “The definition of political objectives”, in periodical Iridanos no. 2-3, January–April 1973 p4-44.

1973: “The multinationals: present day economic empires”, pp 9–92 of “Multinational hypermonopolies: the disintegration of imperialism” by I. Iliou, K. Hadjiargyris, N. Panousis, publisher Gutenberg.

1975: “The constitution and its revision”, publisher Themelio.

1977: “Selected political writings 1974-76”, publisher Diogene.

1977: “The violations of Human Rights”, publisher Ermeias.

1980: Το μήνυμα του Θουκυδίδη - Δοκίμιο “The message of Thucydides - Essay”, publisher Kedros, 1980 & 2002, ISAN 960-04-1428-9.

2005: Κριτικά κείμενα για την τέχνη 1925-1937 “Critical texts on art (1925-1937)”, posthumous edition published by Themelio. ISBN 960-310-311-X.
