= Averoff =

Averoff or Averof (Αβέρωφ) is an Aromanian and Greek surname. It may refer to:

- George Averoff (1815–1899), Greek businessman and philanthropist
- Evangelos Averoff (1910 – 1990), Greek politician
- Ioannis Averoff (born 1944), Greek economist and politician

== See also ==
- Greek cruiser Georgios Averof
- Averoff Gallery
- Averoff Prison
