= Liberal Democratic Center =

Liberal Democratic Center Φιλελεύθερον Δημοκρατικόν Κέντρον
- Founder: Stefanos Stefanopoulos
- Founded: 8 December 1965
- Dissolved: 22 December 1966
- Split from: Centre Union
- Ideology: Liberal conservatism Economic liberalism Liberalism
- Political position: Centre-right

The Liberal Democratic Center (Greek: Φιλελεύθερον Δημοκρατικόν Κέντρον) was a Greek political party founded in 1965 by former Centre Union members of parliament. The party was created to support the government of Stefanos Stefanopoulos after the Iouliana of 1965.

The party was dissolved after the fall of the government of Stefanos Stefanopoulos.

== Well known members ==
- Stefanos Stefanopoulos
- Georgios Athanasiadis-Novas
- Konstantinos Mitsotakis
- Ilias Tsirimokos
- Stavros Kostopoulos
- Dimitrios Papaspyrou
- and other former MPs of Centre Union
