= Roussopoulos =

Roussopoulos or Rhousopoulos (Greek: Ρουσσόπουλος) is a Greek surname and may refer to:

- Athanasios Rhousopoulos (1823–1898), Greek archaeologist
- Athanasios Roussopoulos (1903–1983), Greek scientist
- Carole Roussopoulos (1945–2009), Swiss film director and feminist
- Dimitrios Roussopoulos (born 1936), political activist, ecologist, and writer
- Theodoros Roussopoulos (born 1963), Greek politician
