= Fokion Zaimis =

Greek politician

Fokion (Phokion) Zaimis (1899–1967) was a Greek politician. He served twice as minister of the interior (1949–1950, 1965–1966), minister of finance (March–April 1950, August–September 1950), minister of economy (March 1950, August–September 1950, 1951), minister of housing and reconstruction (1950–1951), minister of health (1950), minister of welfare (1950–1952) and minister of commerce (1947–1948).

Preceded by Panos Hatzipanos	Minister of the Interior; 1949–1950	Succeeded by Nikolaos Lianopoulos
Preceded by Ioannis Toumbas	Minister of the Interior; 1965–1966	Succeeded by Christoforos Stratos
