= Fedon =

Fedon may refer to:

- Julien Fédon (died 1796?), leader of an uprising in Grenada against British rule
- Faidon Matthaiou or Fedon Mattheou (1924-2011), Greek professional basketball player and coach
- Phaedo, a dialogue of the Ancient Greek philosopher Plato
- Phaedon (name), a Greek given name sometimes spelled as Fedon
