= Tsaldaris =

Tsaldaris (Greek: Τσαλδάρης) is a Greek surname. Notable people with the surname include:

- Konstantinos Tsaldaris (1884–1970), prime minister of Greece two times on April 18, 1946 - January 25, 1947 and on August 29, 1947 - November 7, 1947
- Panagis Tsaldaris (1868–1936), prime minister of Greece two times on November 3, 1932 - January 16, 1933 and on March 10, 1933 - October 10, 1935
- Lina Tsaldari (1887–1981), first woman government minister in Greece; Minister for Social Welfare, suffragist, United Nations delegate, and wife of Prime Minister Panagis Tsaldaris
- Dimitrios Tsaldaris (born 1980), Greek basketball player
