= Papoulias =

Papoulias (or Papoulia, maiden name) is a Greek surname. It is the surname of:

- Evelina Papoulia (born 1971), Greek actress and dancer
- Georgios Papoulias (1927–2009), Greek politician and diplomat
- Karolos Papoulias (1929–2021), Greek politician and President of Greece
- Panagiotis Papoulias (born 1969), Greek runner
