= Manolopoulos =

Manolopoulos is a surname. Notable eople with the surname include:

- David Manolopoulos
- Sotiris Manolopoulos
- Sotirios Manolopoulos
- Theodoros Manolopoulos
