= Athanasios Roussopoulos =

Greek engineer and politician (1903–1983)

Athanasios Roussopoulos (Greek: Αθανάσιος Ρουσόπουλος, 1903–1983) was a Greek scientist, Professor at the National Technical University of Athens and politician, member of the Greek Parliament and Minister of Public Works. He was also President of the Technical Chamber of Greece.

== Early years ==
Roussopoulos was born in Athens, the son of Ioannis Roussopoulos, a lawyer from Athens, and Dionysia Veliotis (1871-1955?) of Prasino ca 20 km NW of Levidi in the Peloponnese. He had a sister Eleni Roussopoulos (1911–1993), lawyer and civil servant, who never married.

== Professional life ==
In 1930 he was appointed Professor in Applied Statics and Iron Constructions at the National Technical University of Athens, also known as the Athens Polytechnic, where his work was mostly concerned with the development of the theory of aseismic structures, on which he published many papers. He resigned and became Emeritus Professor in 1958 in order to enter political life.

He was a leading figure in the reconstruction after the Corinth earthquake of 1928, when he collaborated with the then Bishop of Corinth, Damaskinos. In 1932 he fell ill and went to his mother's village to recuperate. The council there consulted him on a new name for the village (many places in Greece were renamed to get away from their old Ottoman names) and he suggested Prasino, which was adopted.

During the war, Roussopoulos was an advisor to the National Organisation of Christian Solidarity set up by the same now Archbishop Damaskinos which was instrumental in saving thousands from starvation or execution, and he also took the dangerous office of President of the secret organisation of National Solidarity which had been founded by the EAM movement to collect food, money and clothing for the resistance fighters.

In December 1944 three professors, including the Rector Ioannis Theophanopoulos, and twelve students of the Athens Polytechnic were arrested, taken to the mountains and executed by an ELAS band. At the Rector's public funeral, Roussopoulos gave the funerary speech in which he expressed: "... Shame to our precious vision of social justice, which was greatly dishonored and soiled from acts that were carried out in its name. We cannot accept the excuse that at great shifts of human history revolutions necessitate victims, because we have behind us a century of rapid and positive development which has changed this account of life and created such spiritual resurgence that it is no longer necessary for humanity to pass through the debris of human barbarity to carry on. ...".

He was President of the Technical Chamber of Greece from 1951 to 1958, when he put forward radical new projects that were vetoed by American advisers because they paralleled Hjalmar Schacht's approach to public finances.

After the great 1953 Ionian earthquake he introduced a system of shoring up the shattered walls of the houses in Lefkada with corrugated iron, a paradoxically attractive feature still of many houses in the city. This successfully withstood the next big earthquake of 2003.

Between 1928 and 1966 he published 36 studies and books on technical subjects, of which several have been translated into English, French and German. He also wrote many influential books about the philosophy of science and life. The first, in 1936, was "To Construct and to Rejoice - towards essential reasoning and order".

== Political life ==
In 1961, he was elected as a Member of Parliament for the Center Union (Greek: Ένωση Κέντρου) party led by George Papandreou the elder, and re-elected in 1964. After the crisis of 1965 (the Iouliana) he joined the short-lived government formed by Stephanos Stephanopoulos and became Minister of Public Works in 1966.

When a military junta ('the Colonels') took power in 1967, he was one of the many intellectuals arrested, sacked from their posts then confined to restricted residence. He then started what he called an informal new 'Plato's Academy' - his old students would gather at his house in Athens and his teaching continued there.

He did not return to Parliament after the return to democracy in 1974 but retired from public life and died in Athens on 1 June 1983.

== Personal life ==
With Dr Calliope Caldis (1906–1990), daughter of Georgios Emmanouil Kaldis (1875–1953), MP for Lesbos and Lemnos, he had a son George (b. 1941). He then married Xeni Soldatou (?-1985) of Lefkada and had two sons, Alexandros (1943–2008) and Andreas (1946–2004).

== Selected writings ==
1932: Die Verschiebungsellipsoide elastischer Korper, Konjugierte Ellipsoiden. Die erzeugenden vektoriellen Dyaden, Zeitshrift fur Angewandte Mathematik und Mechanik, Heft 4, Aug. 1932
1936: Κατασκευασειν και χαιρειν, Papasisis Athens 1936 & 1966
1944: Το θεορητικο κοινωνικο προβλεμα, Athens
1944: Η συλλογικη διανοια, Athens
1947: Διακνρυξις του επι κατοχνς προεδρου τνς εθνικης αλληγγυης, Athens
1949: Αντισεισμικαι Κατασκευαι, Papachrisanthou Athens 1949 & 1956
1950: Economic decongestion and expansion, abolition of direct taxation and issue of production paper currency [in Greek], in Records of Economic and Social Sciences (editor Prof J. Kaltsounakis) vol 27/9, 1950, reprinted 1955, 1959, 1964
1958: Θεορια ελαστικων συμπλεγματων και ελαστικων συνδεσμων, in “Annales Techniques” Athens v35 no. 403-408
1965: Theory of elastic complexes, Roussopoulos, A. I., Transl Cavadias & Tazartes, Elsevier Amsterdam, Library of Congress catalog card number 64-18522
1966: Θπησκεια αγαπις και κατασκευης, Ατηενς
1967: Théorie des structures élastiques, Roussopoulos, A. I., Transl J. Panisset, Dunod Paris, Depot Legal No. 5281
1968: Αναλυσις εργον βιογραφικον σημειωμα, Athens Academy
1970: Εργασια αγαπη ειρηνη, Kapadistriakon
1971: Homos Mathematicus Constructor, Athens
1983: The issue of production, paper currency and the abolition of personal taxation, Roussopoulos, A. I., introduction by L. M.Michaelidis, Bureau Marcus, Amstelveen 1983, reprinted Athens 1987
