= Skouzes family =

The Skouzes family (Greek: οικογένεια Σκουζέ) was a leading family in Athens.

The Skouze family appeared in the 17th century, during the period of Ottoman rule over Greece. The first attested member of the family was Nikolaos Skouzes (1640–1710), who took part in the Morean War (1684–1699) on the Venetian side. His great-grandsons were Georgantas Skouzes (1776–1822), a member of the Filiki Etaireia and ephor of Athens during the initial stages of the Greek Revolution, and Panagis Skouzes (1777–1847), who became one of the greatest landowners before the Revolution and played an active role during the latter.

His nephew, Alexandros Skouzes (1853–1937), lawyer and diplomat, became a member of the Greek Parliament and served several terms as Foreign Minister of Greece. Another descendant of the family, Dimitrios Skouzes (1890–1972), was a writer and mayor of Athens for a short time in 1949.

Today, there are no direct male descendants of the family, but some landmarks are still named after them: Skouze Hill and Skouze Square, where the family had its residence and where a bust of Dimitrios Skouzes is displayed today.

== Famous member of the family ==
- Nikolaos Skouzes (1640–1710)
- Nikolaos Skouzes, grandson of the above

- Dimitrios Skouzes, head of a soap company and son of Nikolaos

- Georgantas Skouzes, trader, son of Dimitrios
- Panagis Skouzes, trader and revolutionary leader in 1821, son of Dimitrios

- Spyridon Skouzes, soldier and son of Panagis

- Georgios Skouzes, banker and son of Dimitrios

- Pavlos Skouzes, entrepreneur and son of Georgios
- Alexandros Skouzes, politician and son of Georgios

- Dimitrios Skouzes, writer and mayor of Athens
