= Foundation of Baron Michael Tositsas =

Baron Michael Tossizza (1885–1950) was the grandson of Konstantinos Tossizza, one of the younger brothers of the National Benefactor of Greece, Michael Tositsas (1787–1856), who had moved to Livorno, Italy, at the beginning of the 19th century. In 1831 he and his descendants were awarded the title of Baron by the local Duke as a reward for the major commercial activity of the Tossizza family.

== Studies - career ==
Baron Michael Tossizza studied in Italy and France and then worked in the family's banking business in Paris. Later on he lived and worked in Lausanne, Switzerland, and the south of France.

== Establishment of the Foundation ==
Although he did not maintain relations with Greece, he was convinced, after years of correspondence and personal meetings with Evangleos Averof, to establish a charity foundation in order to help his homeland. The Foundation was established in June 1947 under the name “Foundation of Baron Michael Tossizza” and its main purpose was the development of the greater Metsovo area, from where he originated.

== The activity of the Foundation ==
The Foundation funded the refurbishment of his ancestors’ house in Metsovo, which today is a folk art museum, as well as the reconstruction of the town's elementary school which had burned down in 1947. The Foundation also funded the construction of a hospital, a sawmill, a creamery, a gym, a ski center and many other public benefit and development projects. Furthermore, the Foundation funded the completion of more than 107 schools in Epirus as well as the construction of a student dorm in Kato Kifissia (Athens suburb) for university students from Epirus.

== Sources ==
- G. Plataris, 1984, “Oi Tositsides sto Livorno” [The Tositsas family in Livorno], Epirotiko Imerologio, 1984, pp. 199–206.
- G. Plataris-Tzimas, Kodikas Diathikon, Meizones kai elassones euergetes tou Metsovou [Log of Wills, Major and Minor Benefactors of Metsovo], Vol. B’, publ. of the Prefecture of Ioannina and the City of Metsovo, Metsovo/Athens 2004, pp. 101–135.
