= Permanent Representative of Greece to the United Nations =

Permanent Representative of Greece to the Headquarters of the United Nations
- Μόνιμος Αντιπρόσωπος της Ελλάδας στον Οργανισμό Ηνωμένων Εθνών
- Incumbent; Aglaia Balta since 25 August 2025
- Style: His/Her Excellency
- Appointer: Prime Minister Of Greece
- Inaugural holder: Alexis Kyrou
- Formation: 1949

The Permanent Representative of Greece to the United Nations (Greek: Μόνιμος Αντιπρόσωπος της Ελλάδας στον Οργανισμό Ηνωμένων Εθνών) is the Permanent Representative of the Greek government to the Headquarters of the United Nations in New York City.

Diplomatic accreditation	Permanent Representative	Greek language	Prime Minister of Greece	Term end
1949	Alexis Kyrou	Αλέξης Κύρου	Alexandros Diomidis	1954
1952	Lina Tsaldari	Λίνα Τσαλδάρη	Alexandros Papagos	
1954	Christianos Xanthopoulos Palamas	Χριστιανός Ξανθόπουλος Παλαμάς	Alexandros Papagos	1960
1960	Pavlos Oikonomou-Gouras	Παύλος Οικονόμου-Γκούρας	Konstantinos Karamanlis	1961
1961	Dimitrios Bitsios	Δημήτριος Μπίτσιος	Konstantinos Karamanlis	1965
1965	Alexis Liatis	Αλέξης Σ. Λιάτης	Georgios Papandreou	1967
1967	Dimitrios Bitsios	Δημήτριος Μπίτσιος	Konstantinos Kollias	1972
1972	Konstantinos Panayotakos	Κωνσταντίνος Παναγιώτακος	Georgios Papadopoulos	1974
1974	Denis Karayannis	Ντένις Καραγιάννης	Adamantios Androutsopoulos	1975
1975	Georgios Papoulias	Γεώργιος Παπούλιας	Konstantinos Karamanlis	1978
1978	Nikolas Katopodis	Νικόλας Κατωπόδης	Konstantinos Karamanlis	1981
1982	Michalis Doundas	Μιχάλης Δούντας	Andreas Papandreou	1987
1987	Konstantinos Zepos	Κωνσταντίνος Ζέπος	Andreas Papandreou	1990
1990	Antonios Exarchos	Αντώνιος Εξάρχος	Konstantinos Mitsotakis	1994
1994	Christos Zacharakis	Χρήστος Ζαχαράκης	Andreas Papandreou	1999
1999	Ilias Gounaris	Ηλίας Γουναρής	Costas Simitis	2002
2002	Adamantios Vassilakis	Αδαμάντιος Βασιλάκης	Costas Simitis	2007
2007	Ioannis Mourikis	Γιάννης Μουρίκης	Kostas Karamanlis	2009
July 17, 2009	Anastasis Mitsialis	Αναστάσης Μιτσιάλης	Kostas Karamanlis	2013
May 3, 2013	Michalis Spinellis	Μιχάλης Σπινέλλης	Antonis Samaras	2015
March 10, 2015	Aikaterini Boura	Αικατερίνη Μπούρα	Alexis Tsipras	2019
25 August 2025	Aglaia Balta	Αγλαΐα Μπαλτά	Kyriakos Mitsotakis	Current Holder
