= Georgios Rallis =

Greek politician (1918–2006)

- Γεώργιος Ράλλης
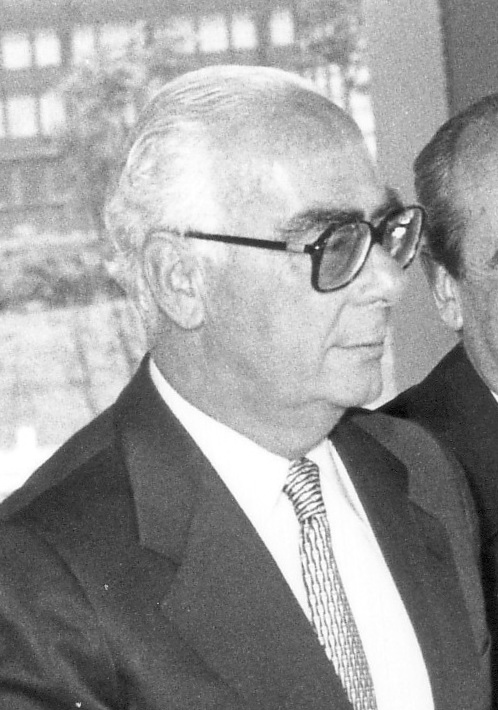
- Rallis in 1981

Prime Minister of Greece
- In office 10 May 1980 – 21 October 1981
- President: Konstantinos Karamanlis
- Preceded by: Konstantinos Karamanlis
- Succeeded by: Andreas Papandreou

Leader of the Opposition
- In office 21 October 1981 – 9 December 1981
- Prime Minister: Andreas Papandreou
- Preceded by: Andreas Papandreou
- Succeeded by: Evangelos Averoff

President of New Democracy
- In office 8 May 1980 – 9 December 1981
- Preceded by: Konstantinos Karamanlis
- Succeeded by: Evangelos Averoff
Ministerial offices
Minister for Government Coordination
In office 11 October 1980 – 29 June 1981
Prime Minister	Himself
Preceded by	Ioannis Boutos
Succeeded by	Ioannis Palaiokrassas
In office 28 November 1977 – 10 May 1978
Prime Minister	Konstantinos Karamanlis
Preceded by	Panagis Papaligouras
Succeeded by	Konstantinos Mitsotakis
Minister for Foreign Affairs
In office 10 May 1978 – 10 May 1980
Prime Minister	Konstantinos Karamanlis
Preceded by	Panagis Papaligouras
Succeeded by	Konstantinos Mitsotakis
Minister of Education
In office 5 January 1976 – 28 November 1977
Prime Minister	Konstantinos Karamanlis
Preceded by	Panagiotis Zepos
Succeeded by	Ioannis Varvitsiotis
Minister of the Presidency (Note: Minister Assigned to the Prime Minister from 26 July 1974 to 1 January 1975)
In office 21 November 1974 – 28 November 1977
Prime Minister	Konstantinos Karamanlis
Preceded by	Angelos Vlachos
Succeeded by	Konstantinos Stephanopoulos
In office 26 July 1974 – 9 October 1974
Prime Minister	Konstantinos Karamanlis
Preceded by	Konstantinos Rallis
Succeeded by	Angelos Vlachos
In office 11 April 1954 – 26 February 1956
Prime Minister	Alexandros Papagos; Konstantinos Karamanlis
Preceded by	Panagiotis Sifnaios
Succeeded by	Konstantinos Tsatsos
Minister of the Interior
In office 24 July 1974 – 26 July 1974
Prime Minister	Konstantinos Karamanlis
Preceded by	Vasilios Tsoumpas
Succeeded by	Christoforos Stratos
In office 4 November 1961 – 19 June 1963
Prime Minister	Konstantinos Karamanlis
Preceded by	Nikolaos Lianopoulos
Succeeded by	Charalampos Panagiotopoulos; Ioannis Daskalopoulos (acting)
Minister of Social Welfare
Provisional; 3 April 1967 – 21 April 1967
Prime Minister	Panagiotis Kanellopoulos
Preceded by	Ioannis Chrysikos
Succeeded by	Efstathios Poulantzas
Minister of Public Order
In office 3 April 1967 – 21 April 1967
Prime Minister	Panagiotis Kanellopoulos
Preceded by	Sophoklis Tzanetis
Succeeded by	Pavlos Totomis
Minister of Communications and Public Works
In office 29 February 1956 – 28 February 1958
Prime Minister	Konstantinos Karamanlis
Preceded by	Lambros Eftaxias
Succeeded by	Tryphon Triantaphyllakos

Personal details
- Born: Georgios Ioannou Rallis; 26 December 1918 Kolonaki, Athens, Kingdom of Greece
- Died: 15 March 2006 (aged 87) Kolonaki, Athens, Greece
- Party: New Democracy
- Spouse: Lena Voultsou (m. 1950)
- Children: 2
- Education: University of Athens

Georgios Ioannou Rallis (Greek: Γεώργιος Ιωάννου Ράλλης; 26 December 1918 – 15 March 2006), anglicised to George Rallis, was a Greek conservative politician and Prime Minister of Greece from 1980 to 1981.

== Ancestors in politics ==
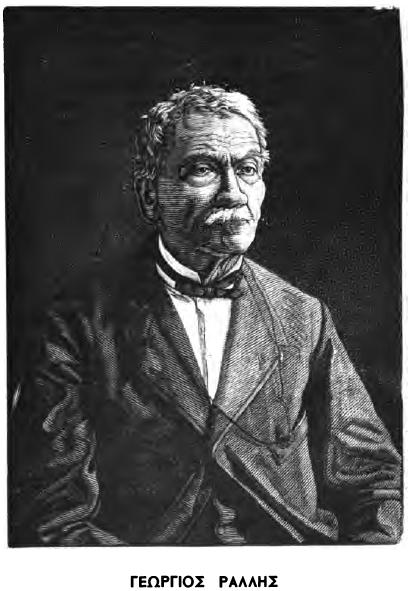
George A. Rallis, great-grandfather of Georgios Rallis

Georgios was descended from the old, noble and political Rallis family. Alexandros Rallis, born in 1760, was a prominent Phanariote (Greek from Constantinople). In 1849 his son George A. Rallis became Chief Justice of the Greek Supreme Court. Dimitrios Rallis, paternal grandfather of Georgios Rallis, served as Prime Minister of Greece for five separate short periods in 1897, 1903, 1905, 1909 and 1921. Dimitrios's son and Georgios's father, Ioannis Rallis, was a collaborationist Prime Minister from 1943 to 1944, during the German occupation. After the liberation of Greece he was sentenced to life imprisonment for collaboration and died in jail in 1946. His maternal grandfather, Georgios Theotokis, was four times Prime Minister of Greece, between 1901 and 1907.

== Early life ==
Georgios Rallis was born on 26 December 1918 in the Kolonaki neighbourhood of Athens.

He studied law and political sciences at the University of Athens. Shortly after graduating he joined the fight against fascist Italy after the italian invasion on 28 October 1940 as a cavalry Second Lieutenant of the Reserve. He was recalled to active service during the Greek Civil War of 1946–49, during which he served in the armoured corps.

== Political career ==
Rallis was first elected to the Greek Parliament as a member of the People's Party in the 1950 general election, and was re-elected in all subsequent elections until the end of his political career in 1993, except the 1958 election and the June 1989 election, where he did not run. He was first appointed a cabinet minister on 11 April 1954 in the government of Alexandros Papagos, as Minister for the Presidency of the Government.

A close collaborator of Konstantinos Karamanlis, he retained the position under the first Karamanlis cabinet (6 October 1955 – 29 February 1956), and went on to serve as Minister for Transport and Public Works in the 1956–58 Karamanlis cabinet, and as Minister for the Interior in the 1961–1963 Karamanlis cabinet. He was also among the founding members of the National Radical Union (ERE) in 1956. In 1958, he quarrelled with Karamanlis over the latter's adoption of a new electoral law, on which he had not been consulted, and for a few years left ERE, before returning to the fold in 1961.

Rallis was appointed to the post of Minister of Public Order in the caretaker cabinet of Panagiotis Kanellopoulos on 3 April 1967. It was in this position that the coup d'état of the Colonels found him on 21 April 1967. Rallis managed to evade capture by the putschists and go to the command centre of the Greek Gendarmerie, from where by radio he tried in vain to get in contact with the III Army Corps and order it to descend onto Athens and suppress the coup. Following the establishment of the Junta of the Colonels, he was arrested thrice, imprisoned and sent to internal exile to the island of Kasos. Among his anti-regime activities were his campaigning against the Junta-sponsored Republic referendum of 1973, and his criticism of the regime through his editorship of the magazine Politika Themata.

In 1974, following the fall of the dictatorship, Rallis became briefly Minister for the Interior and then again Minister to the Prime Minister in the national unity government under Karamanlis, and held on to the post (from 2 January 1975 as Minister for the Presidency of the Government) under the government formed by Karamanlis' new party, New Democracy, after the November 1974 election. On 5 January 1976 he also assumed the post of Minister for National Education and Religious Affairs, which he held in tandem with the former post until the end of the cabinet term on 28 November 1977. From the post of Minister for Education he oversaw the educational reform, the institution of the Demotic Greek as the formal language in schools and the administration, replacing the Katharevousa, and the reform of the school curricula.

Following the 1977 election, he served first as Minister for Coordination, before becoming Minister for Foreign Affairs in May 1978. He was the first Greek Foreign Minister to visit the Soviet Union, in October 1978, and negotiated Greece's accession to the EEC, signing Greece's accession agreement in May 1979. He also worked to restore relations with Bulgaria and Yugoslavia.

After Karamanlis was elected to the post of President of the Republic, on 8 May 1980 Rallis was elected by New Democracy's parliamentary group as the new party chairman, and was sworn in as Prime Minister on 10 May. During his tenure Greece rejoined the military wing of NATO.

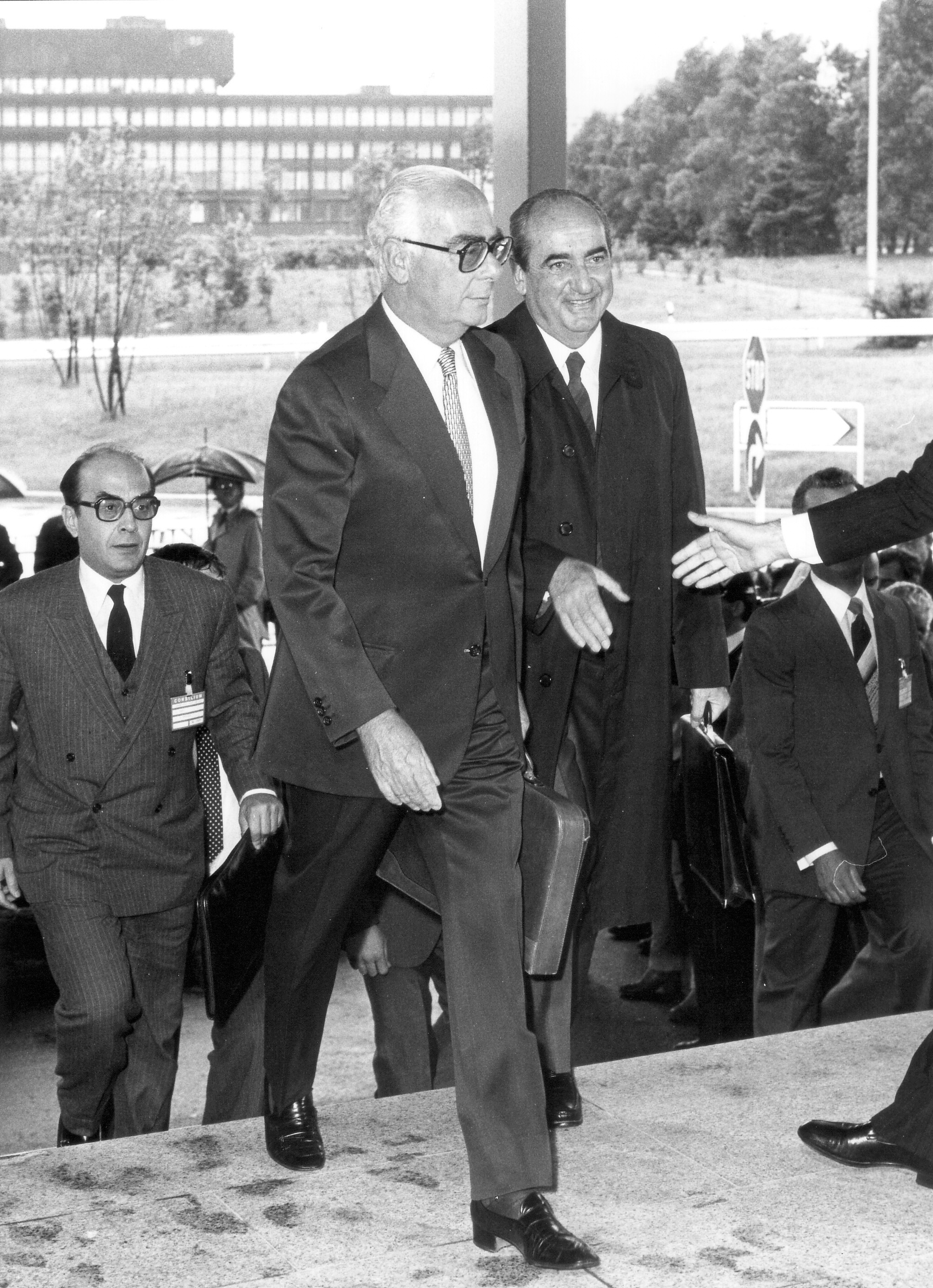
Prime Minister Rallis with Foreign Minister Constantine Mitsotakis in Luxembourg on 26 June 1981

He led the government until his defeat by Andreas Papandreou's PASOK in the 18 October 1981 election, resigning on 21 October. Shortly after, in early December, having lost the confidence of his party's MPs, he resigned from the chairmanship of New Democracy.

In May 1987 he split from New Democracy and became an independent MP. He did not participate in the June 1989 election, but after a personal invitation by the new New Democracy chairman, Konstantinos Mitsotakis, he rejoined the party and was elected an MP for Corfu. After a renewed dispute with Mitsotakis, now Prime Minister, over the handling of the Macedonia naming dispute, he resigned from his post and retired from politics in March 1993.

== Personal life and death ==
Rallis married Eleni Maria "Lena" Voultsou (1928–2015) in 1950 and they had two daughters, Zaira Papaligoura (b. 1951) and Ioanna Farmakidi (b. 1960). During his retirement, Rallis established and cultivated organically-farmed vineyards and olive groves at his family estate on Corfu.

Although Rallis became Prime Minister at a time when the fortunes of his party were in decline, he remained a popular figure because of his well-liked personal attributes of mildness, modesty and straightforwardness. A wealthy patrician by birth, he always made a point of living modestly, walking to work (even as a Prime Minister, much to the frustration of his security detail), and taking the time to greet and talk with those he met on the street. Rallis died of heart failure at his home in the Kolonaki neighbourhood of Athens on 15 March 2006, at age 87.

Rallis spoke English, French, and German, and wrote 14 books.

A bust of Rallis in Corfu was stolen in April 2019.

Political offices
Preceded by Nikolaos Lianopoulos	Minister for the Interior; 1961–1963	Succeeded by Charalambos Panagiotopoulos
Preceded by Vasileios Tsoumbas	Minister for the Interior; 1974	Succeeded by Christoforos Stratos
Preceded by Panagiotis Zepos	Minister for National Education and Religious Affairs; 1976–1977	Succeeded by Ioannis Varvitsiotis
Preceded by Panagiotis Papaligouras	Minister for Foreign Affairs; 1978–1980	Succeeded by Konstantinos Mitsotakis
Preceded by Konstantinos Karamanlis	Prime Minister of Greece; 1980–1981	Succeeded by Andreas Papandreou
Party political offices
Preceded by Konstantinos Karamanlis	President of New Democracy; 1980–1981	Succeeded by Evangelos Averoff
