= Catherine Boura =

Greek diplomat

Catherine Boura (Greek: Αικατερίνη Μπούρα, Aikaterini Boura) is a Greek diplomat who served as the country's Permanent Representative to the United Nations from 2015 until 2019.

== Early life and education ==
Boura was born in Athens. She has a bachelor's degree in literature from the National and Kapodistrian University of Athens, a master's degree in history from the School of Slavonic and East European Studies and a PhD in history from London University.

== Career ==
Boura joined the diplomatic services in 1983, working for the Department of European Union Common Foreign and Security Policy and then the Policy Planning and Early Warning Unit of the Council of the European Union in Brussels from 1999 until 2002. From 2004 until 2007 she was Greece's Consul General in New York.

Boura worked in the Ministry of Foreign Affairs as Director of the Department for European Countries from 2008 to 2009 and Chief of Protocol from 2009 until 2011. She was ambassador to Lebanon from 2011 until 2015. She was appointed as Permanent Representative of Greece to the United Nations on 10 March 2015. In December 2015, she introduced a resolution entitled "Return or Restitution of Cultural Property to the Countries of Origin".

== Publications ==
- Boura, Catherine (1999). "The Greek Millet in Turkish Politics: Greeks in the Ottoman Parliament (1908–1918)". In Charles Issawi; Dimitri Gondicas (eds.). Ottoman Greeks in the Age of Nationalism: Politics, Economy and Society in the Nineteenth Century. Darwin Press. ISBN 9780878500963.
- Bouras, Catherine (13 October 2015). "Women, Peace and Security" (PDF). UN Security Council.

== Awards and honours ==
- James Jay Dudley Luce Foundation Global Citizenship Award, 2016
