= Christoforos Stratos =

Greek writer and politician

Christoforos Stratos (Greek: Χριστόφορος Στράτος; 1924–1982) was a Greek writer and politician. He was three times minister of the interior of Greece.

== Life ==
Christoforos Stratos was born in 1924 in Patras. He was a son of a textile salesman and co-founder of Piraiki-Patraiki Cotton Manufacturing Company. Stratos studied law at Athens University.

At the young age, Stratos became a managing director of Piraiki-Patraiki and by the mid-1950s the company became the largest industrial firm in Greece and the second largest employer after the Greek state.

Stratos was married and had two sons and one daughter.

Stratos was active in the Orthodox Church and the Greek Scout Movement. He also co-founded the Society of Hellenic Studies, a conservative liberal think-tank.

Stratos built a close relationship with the Palace becoming a friend of the King Paul and his son, Constantine.

In 1962, Stratos founded the Hellenic Management Association to introduce modern techniques of business management in public and private companies.

== Political career ==
Stratos entered politics in the early 1960s when the King appointed him as a minister in two caretaker governments. The caretaker governments were set up before 1967 to hold elections.

From 1967 to 1974, the colonels’ dictatorship was established in Greece. During this time, Stratos was active in resisting the military dictatorship. In 1973, he was arrested for three months after an attempted coup by naval officers.

After restoration of democracy in 1974, Stratos joined the new democracy party of then Premier Konstantinos Karamanlis. Stratos ran for a parliamentary seat in his native Aetolia-Akarnanis.

He became a Minister of public works in the cabinet of 21 November 1974. He was appointed minister of public works and interior under several New Democracy governments.

Christoforos Stratos died of stroke on 15 April 1982 at the age of 58.

Preceded by Fokion Zaimis	Minister of the Interior of Greece	Succeeded by Spyros Theotokis
Preceded by Georgios Rallis	Minister of the Interior of Greece; 1974	Succeeded by Panagiotis Zepos
Preceded by Georgios Mitsopoulos	Minister of the Interior of Greece; 1977–1981	Succeeded by Georgios D. Daskalakis
