= Lina Tsaldari =

Greek politician (1887–1981)

- Born: 1887
- Died: 17 October 1981 (aged 93–94)
- Occupation: Politician
- Known for: First female minister in Greece
- Spouse: Panagis Tsaldaris (m. 1919; died in 1936)

Lina Tsaldari (Greek: Λίνα Τσαλδάρη; 1887 – 17 October 1981) was a right-wing Greek politician. She became the first female minister in Greece in 1956, serving as the Minister for Social Welfare under Konstantinos Karamanlis' government.

== Early life ==
Tsaldari was born Lina Lambrou (Greek: Λίνα Λάμπρου) in 1887 to Spyridon Lambros (b. 1851 - d. 1919), who succeeded Nikolaos Kalogeropoulos as Prime Minister of Greece, serving from October 1916 to February 1917. Tsaldari was of Aromanian descent, just like her father.

== Political career ==
Tsaldari became the first woman to serve in the Government of Greece, serving as the Minister of Social Welfare. She was also an active suffragist. After serving in Parliament, she became Permanent Representative of Greece to the United Nations.

== Personal life ==
Tsaldari married Panagis Tsaldaris (b. 1868 – d. 1936) in 1919, the same year that her father died in Skopelos. Like her father, her husband served as Prime Minister of Greece.

== Death ==
Tsaldari died of a stroke on 17 October 1981. She was 94 years old.
