= Phaedon (name) =

Phaedon (Greek: Φαίδων) is a Greek given name. It can also be transliterated as Phaedo, Fedon, or Faidon.

The meaning of Phaedon comes from the Greek words "φαι>φη>φως" which means "light" and "διδοναι>δων" which means "giving", so it could be translated as "he who gives light". Notable people with the name include:

- Phaedon or Phaedo of Elis (4th century BC), ancient Greek philosopher
- Phaedon Avouris (born 1945), Greek chemical physicist
- Phaedon Georgitsis (1939–2019), Greek cinema actor
- Phaedon Gizikis (1917–1999), Greek general who was President of Greece from 1973 to 1974

== See also ==
- Pheidon, an Argive ruler during the 7th century BCE
- Phedon Papamichael (born 1962), a Greek cinematographer and film director
- Faidon Matthaiou (1924–2011), Greek rower, basketball coach, and basketball player
- Phaedon-Anninos Cavalieratos, representative of Greece to NATO 1967-1972
