= Evgenios Zalokostas =

Greek diplomat and writer

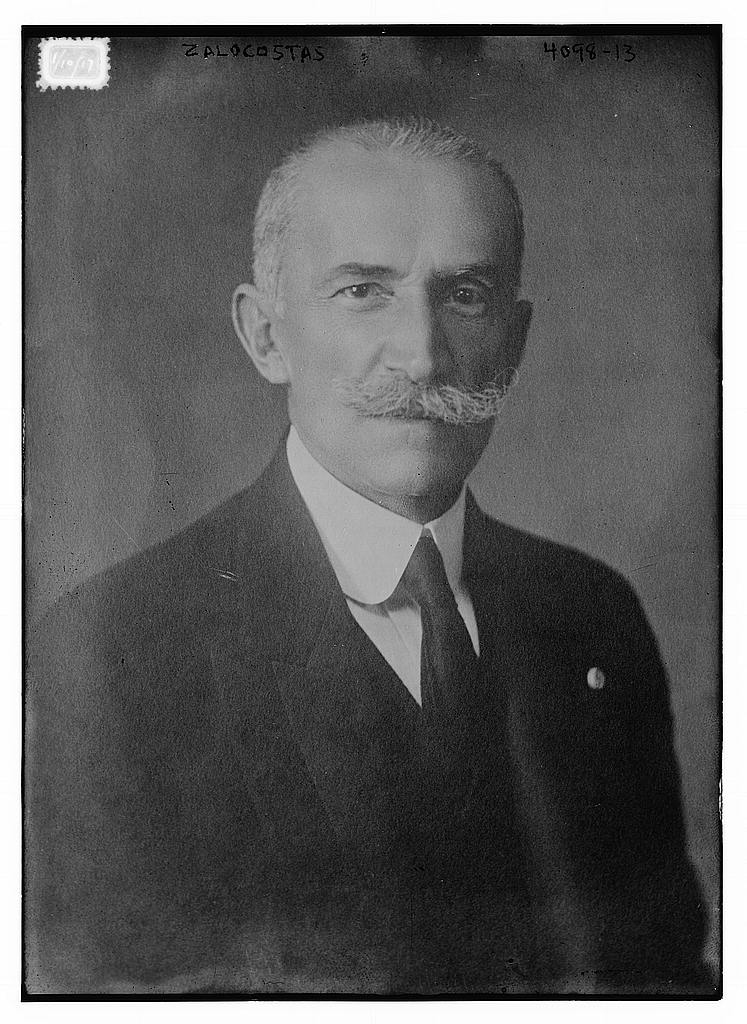
Evgenios Zalokostas circa 1917

Evgenios Zalokostas (Greek: Ευγένιος Ζαλοκώστας, 1855–1919), was the foreign minister of Greece from October 10, 1916 to April 21, 1917.
