= Spyridon Lambros =

Greek historian and politician (1851–1919)

- Σπυρίδων Λάμπρος
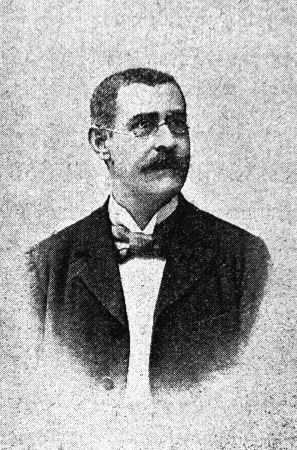
- Lampros, as portrayed in the journal Nea Ellas in 1896

Prime Minister of Greece
- In office 27 September 1916 – 12 April 1917
- Monarch: Constantine I
- Preceded by: Nikolaos Kalogeropoulos
- Succeeded by: Alexandros Zaimis

Personal details
- Born: April 8, 1851 Corfu, United States of the Ionian Islands
- Died: July 23, 1919 (aged 68) Skopelos, Kingdom of Greece
- Children: Lina Tsaldari
- Parent: Pavlos Lambros (father)
- Education: National University of Athens
- Occupation: History professor
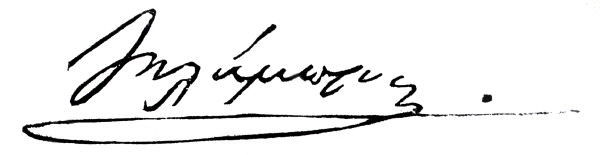
- Signature

Spyridon Lambros or Lampros (Greek: Σπυρίδων Λάμπρος; 8 April 1851 – 23 July 1919) was a Greek history professor and briefly Prime Minister of Greece during the National Schism.

== Biography ==
He was born in Corfu in 1851 and was educated in London, Paris and Vienna, studying history. His father, Pavlos Lambros, was an Aromanian (Vlach) from Kalarrytes in Epirus.

In 1872, he went to study in Berlin university and eventually completed his doctorate in Leipzig University. In 1890, he joined the faculty of the University of Athens and taught history and ancient literature. He became Provost of the university in 1893, serving in that capacity twice, 1893–1894 and 1912–1913.

After 1903, Lambros started an academic movement called Neos Hellenomnemon (Νέος Ἑλληνομνήμων) which studied the scientific and philosophical developments of the Greek-speaking world during the Byzantine and Ottoman eras.

In October 1916 with Greece in the midst of the National Schism and under two governments (Eleftherios Venizelos in Thessaloniki and King Constantine in Athens), the formerly Liberal (and associated with Venizelos) Lambros accepted the King's commission to form a government in Athens. Eventually, riots took place in Athens (the Noemvriana), for which Lambros was judged responsible due to mis-management. He resigned as Prime Minister. After the exile of the king in summer 1917, Lambros was put in internal exile by the Venizelists, in Hydra and Skopelos.

He died in Skopelos on 23 July 1919.

== Legacy ==
His daughter, Lina Tsaldari, was elected to Parliament in 1956 and became the first woman in the Greek Cabinet as Minister of Social Welfare.

== Works ==
- Catalogue of the Greek Manuscripts on Mount Athos (2 vol. set) vol.1, vol.2
- Ecthesis Chronica And Chronicon Athenarum

Preceded by Nikolaos Kalogeropoulos	Prime Minister of Greece; 27 September 1916 – 21 April 1917	Succeeded by Alexandros Zaimis
