= List of permanent representatives of Greece to NATO =

Permanent Representative of Greece to the North Atlantic Treaty Organization
- Μόνιμος Αντιπρόσωπος της Ελλάδας στο ΝΑΤΟ
- Style: His/Her Excellency
- Inaugural holder: Panagiotis Pipinelis
- Formation: 1952

The Permanent Representative of Greece to NATO (Greek: Μόνιμος Αντιπρόσωπος της Ελλάδας στο ΝΑΤΟ) is the Permanent Representative of the Greek government to the North Atlantic Council.

Diplomatic accreditation	Permanent Representative	Greek language	Observations	Prime Minister of Greece	Term end
1952	Panagiotis Pipinelis	el:Παναγιώτης Πιπινέλης		Alexandros Papagos	1952
1952	Georgios Exintaris	Γεώργιος Εξηντάρης	(* born in Malaga or Malgars of East Thrace in 1887; died in Athens on 12 October 1963): was a Greek politician and diplomat who also served as minister.; He studied Law at the University of Paris.; From 1915 he began a career in the Diplomatic Corps.; In 1920 he was placed at the embassy in Istanbul, but in the same year he resigned because he was elected a member of Thrace.; In 1924-1925 he was chairman of the Greek-Turkish Population Exchange Committee.; In 1926 he was elected deputy of Kavala and in 1932, 1933 and 1936 MP Rodopi.; In 1928 he was Minister of Agriculture and in 1933 Minister of Northern Greece.; After 1944 he was a representative of Greece in the Advisory Committee on Italian Affairs.; In 1950 he was CEO of the liberal Athens newspaper Vima.; In 1950 he became Greek ambassador to Italy.; In 1952 he was again elected Member of Parliament and appointed as Permanent Representative of Greece to NATO (1952-1956), while at the same time he was a minister without a portfolio in the Papagos and Karamanlis governments.	Alexandros Papagos	1956
1956	Michail Melas	Μιχαήλ Μελάς	(1967 in Paris): In 1939 he was first secretary in Paris.; In 1962 he became Greek ambassador to the United Kingdom.; Greek military junta of 1967–1974 For many of the local heads of mission, the monarchs and their sovereigns from their homeland were a delicate problem, even a mortal danger for the one: Michel Melas, the Greek ambassador, is in the hospital with a heart attack, which he suffered, as in front of the hotel, where Queen Friederike lived, was demonstrated because of held in Greece political prisoners.; 1967: At a meeting of the North Atlantic Council, NATO's Secretary General, Mr. Manlio Brosio, paid tribute to Ambassador Michel Melas, former Greek Permanent Representative to NATO (1956–62), who died recently in Paris.	Konstantinos Karamanlis	1962
1962	Christos Xanthopoulos-Palamas	Χρήστος Ξανθόπουλος – Παλαμάς	(b. November 1902, Missolonghi, Greece - d. January 1977), From 1954 to 1960 he was also permanent representative to the United Nations.; In 1964 and 1973 he served as Vice foreign minister of the Greek military junta of 1967–1974.	Konstantinos Karamanlis	1967
1967	Phaedon-Anninos Cavalieratos	Φαίδων Άννινος-Καβαλιεράτος	(* Argostoli, March 20, 1912): He studied Political Sciences at the University of Athens and followed a diplomatic career in Egypt and Turkey (secretary of embassies).; He was appointed Deputy Foreign Minister on January 26, 1967 to the Paraskevopoulos Government Service, a post he remained until April 1967.; from 12/12/1972 to 08/10/1973 he was Deputy Foreign Minister, during the Greek military junta of 1967–1974.; In his last capacity he officially visited Bucharest.; He was married to Maria Kandunia"	Konstantinos Kollias	1972
1972	Anghelos Chorafas	Άγγελος Χωραφάς	1959 he was Acting Consul-General of Greece in London	Georgios Papadopoulos	1974
1974	Vyron Theodoropoulos	Βύρων Θεοδωρόπουλος		Adamantios Androutsopoulos	1976
1976	Eustathios Lagakos	Ευστάθιος Λαγάκος		Konstantinos Karamanlis	1979
1979	Nikolas E. Athanasiou	Νικόλας Ε. Αθανασίου	From 1958 to 1961 he served at the Consulate General in London.; From 1968 to 1970 he was Consul general in Munich during the Greek military junta of 1967–1974.	Konstantinos Karamanlis	1981
1981	Georgios Sekeris	Γιώργος Σέκερης		Andreas Papandreou	1982
1982	Stylianos Vassilicos	Στυλιανός Βασίλειος		Andreas Papandreou	1986
1986	Christos Zacharakis	Χρήστος Ζαχαράκης	September 21, 1989 Embassy of Greece, Washington, D.C.	Andreas Papandreou	1990
1990	Ioannis Bourloyannis-Tsangaridis	Ιωάννης Μπουρλογιάννης-Τσαγγαρίδης		Konstantinos Mitsotakis	1992
1992	Dimitri Petrounakos	Δημήτρη Πετρονακάκου		Konstantinos Mitsotakis	1995
1995	George V. Savvaides	Γιώργος Β. Σαββαΐδης		Andreas Papandreou	2000
2000	Vassilis Kaskarelis	Βασίλης Κασκαρέλης		Costas Simitis	2004
2004	Yannis - Alexis Zepos	Γιάννης - Αλέξης Ζέπος		Kostas Karamanlis	2007
2007	Stamatopoulos Thrassyvoulos Terry	Σταματοπουλος Θρασυβουλος Terry		Kostas Karamanlis	2012
2013	Michael-Christos Diamessis	Μιχαήλ-Χρήστος Διαμέσης		Antonis Samaras	2016
2016	Spiros Lampridis	Σπυρος Λαμπριδης	*From 2013 to 2016 he was Greek Ambassador to Israel.	Alexis Tsipras	2020
