= Georgios Emmanouil Kaldis =

Greek politician

Georgios Emmanouil Kaldis (Greek: Γεώργιος Εμμανουήλ Καλδής, romanized: Geórgios Emmanouíl Kaldís; 1875–1953) was a Greek lawyer, journalist, politician, and member of the Greek Parliament from 1915 to 1928 in the Liberal Party (Komma Fileleftheron) founded by Eleftherios Venizelos.

== Early years ==
George Emmanuel Kaldis (the name Kaldis is interchangeable with Kaldellis, and anglicised as Caldis) came from a poor family originating in Akrasi, or Akrasion a small village situated in the hills and small plateau 8 km northwest from Plomari, near the central southern coast of the island of Lesbos, where he was born in 1875. His father was Emmanouil Georgios Kaldellis, who married Amersouda [? -1940]. Amersouda was known as “the orphan" in the village: she was found alive on a beach on the island of Chios as a young child with her younger brother, tragically next to their dead parents who were not Greek but of European descent and were thought to have been slain by pirates. The two blue-eyed blond children at the time could not speak Greek and were raised by a Greek Orthodox priest and his wife along with their own children.

George was the eldest of 7 sons and 2 daughters from this marriage.

Lesbos was then a province of the Ottoman Empire. Kaldis's talents were recognised by the village priest, who arranged for him to receive a good education, first at the gymnasium of Plomari, then in Chios, before finally going to Constantinople (Istanbul) where he studied literature at the Ecole Superieure d’Instituteurs of the Patriarchate. His knowledge of Turkish was excellent and enabled him to follow developments in an Ottoman Empire which was beginning to change. When he graduated, the Patriarchate placed the new teacher in a school in Moudros, on the island of Lemnos.

== Political career ==
=== In Ottoman-ruled Lemnos ===
While Lemnos was under Ottoman rule, George Kaldis was one of the secret agents of the Church and would often travel to Constantinople to report on his work. He gave up teaching, registered in the Law School of the University of Athens and was one of the first graduates from Lesbos.

He stood as a candidate to represent Lemnos in the Ottoman Parliament and concentrated on local issues. The contest in these elections developed into a fierce dispute which divided the Lemniots into two camps, one supporting Kaldis and the other supporting the local bishop. Traditionally, under the millet system, Orthodox Church leaders had played a great role. However, with the political reforms under way after the Young Turk Revolution, and in keeping with European practice, Kaldis opposed the bishops' continued interference in matters other than strictly ecclesiastical. In the end the outcome hinged on a single vote. The bishop, as the official representative of the non-Muslim minorities, had a casting vote in the election; unsurprisingly, he cast it for his own candidacy.

=== Politics in Greece ===
In November 1912, during the First Balkan War, a Greek Navy task force took the island of Lemnos, which became the Greek fleet's major forward anchorage during the war. After Lemnos was joined with Greece, Kaldis stood once more for election as the first Member of the Greek Parliament for Lesbos and Lemnos. It was not easy for a poor teacher to succeed when such positions were sought by the leading families of the island. He failed narrowly again, but succeeded in the next election, as a representative of the Liberal Party led by Eleftherios Venizelos. He would remain an MP and then Senator until 1928.

The enthusiasm the villagers felt for the naval victories of 1912 and liberation did not stop them from complaining when the 'liberating heroes' sought to benefit more directly from the victory: the peasants in Lemnos suffered from a plague of army officers who would commandeer their sheep and crops and never pay for them. Kaldis defended the farmers with an article in a Greek newspaper of Alexandria, as there was no local press yet. This created a scandal at a time when patriotism was de rigueur. To defend its honour, the army prosecuted him. He was sentenced to 6 months in prison because all those who had complained and should have testified in his favour had been intimidated by the army and prudently vanished out of reach of the court. In the event, he was released on the orders of Admiral Pavlos Kountouriotis, who was notified of the affair by Kaldis' wife, Marianthi.

During the 1915 Gallipoli campaign Kaldis was the official representative of the Greek Government on the island of Lemnos whose port was the launching point of the British and ANZAC invasion. He received the Admiral of the British fleet and his commanders and discussed the issues of the day.

Kaldis and his family moved to Plomari and then to Mytilini in 1917 where he resumed his journalism. During most of this period and beyond into the 1930s, he was editor of the newspaper Eleftheros Logos (Free Speech) and wrote for several other papers. He also opened the first lawyer's office in Mytilini in February 1917, in conjunction with Petros M. Kairis. In late 1922, Kaldis took a prominent role in catering for the masses of Greek refugees arriving in the island following the Asia Minor Catastrophe.

In 1928 the support he had been promised by George Papandreou (who had taken over from Venizelos as leader of the Liberal Party) for his reelection as an MP did not materialise. Consequently, he became a Senator and decided to retire from all political and professional life. He closed his lawyer's office and lived quietly with his family, earning his living thereafter chiefly as a journalist.

== Personal life ==
In 1904 he married Marianthi Matzikas (1885–1970), recently returned to Lemnos after finishing school in Alexandria. They had five children: Kalliopi (lawyer and ambassador, 1906–1990, better known as Dr Calliope G. Caldis), Eleftheria (married Ilias Iliou, 1908–2003), Manolis Caldis (civil engineer, 1910–1998), Christoforos Caldis (director of Hellenic Shipyards, 1912–2006) and Dimitris Kaldis (lawyer, publisher and editor of Δελτίο Φορολογικής Νομοθεσίας [Bulletin of Tax Legislation], 1914–2010).

In 1946, after the Second World War, they settled in Athens. George Kaldis died in 1953, a man of rare integrity among Greek politicians of whom it was said that he had finished as poor as he had started: "Not one house, not one stremma (of land)" ("Ούτε ένα σπίτι, ούτε ένα στρέμμα")
