= Ioannis Averoff =

Greek politician and economist (born 1944)

- Ιωάννης Αβέρωφ
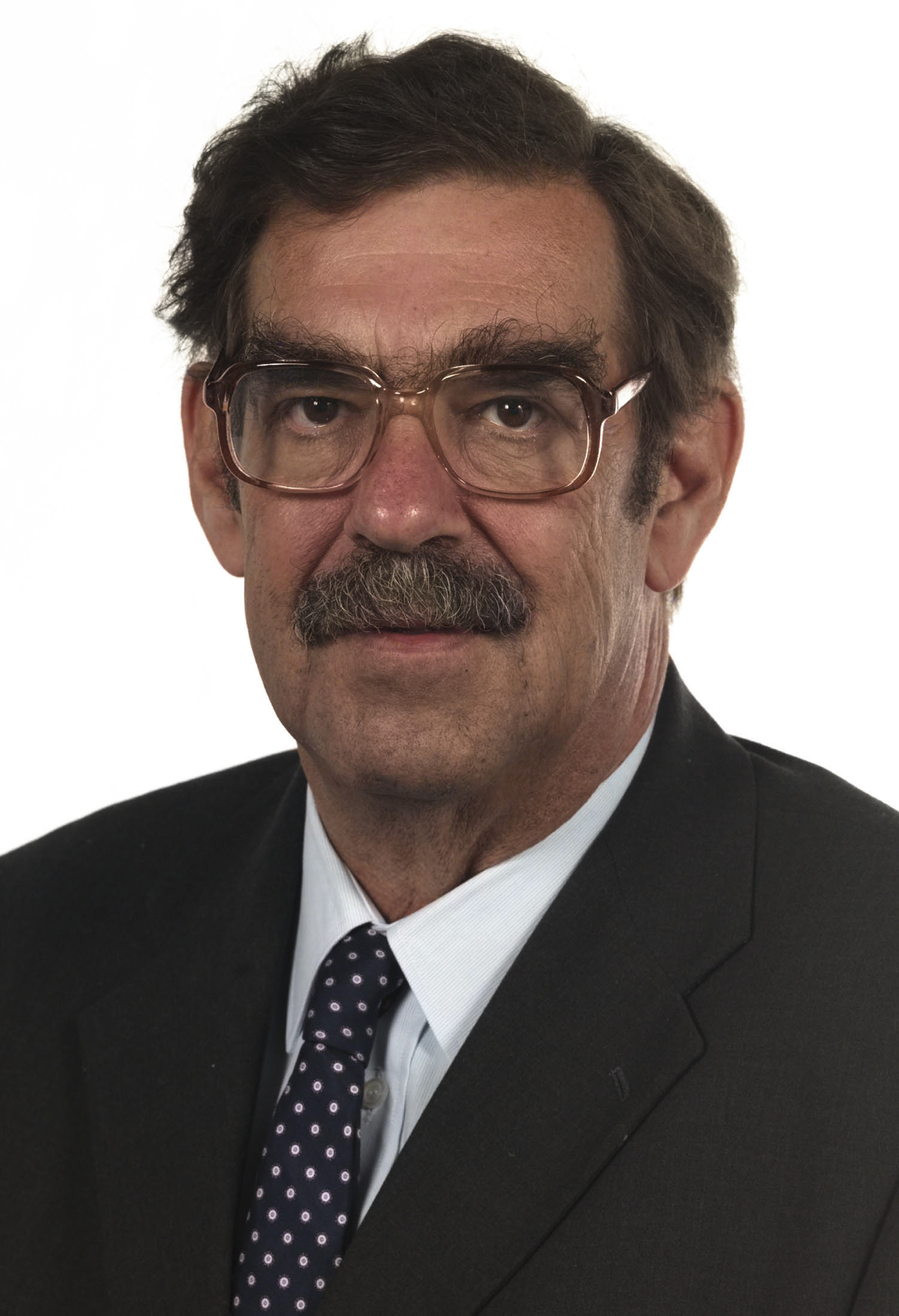
- Averoff in 1999

Member of the European Parliament
- In office 20 July 1999 – 19 July 2004
- Constituency: Greece

Personal details
- Born: Athens, Greece
- Party: New Democracy
- Relations: Evangelos Averoff (uncle)

Ioannis Averoff (Greek: Ιωάννης Αβέρωφ) is a Greek politician and economist. He served in the Hellenic Parliament and the European Parliament.

== Biography ==
Averoff was born in Athens on 23 December 1944 to Michael Averoff and Maria Papastratos. He studied economics at Athens University of Economics and Business, and worked at his mother's family's tobacco factory. He entered politics by becoming mayor of Metsovo. He ran in the 1986 Athens mayoral election but lost, receiving 1.49% of the vote. In the triple elections of 1989-1990, Averoff was elected to the Hellenic Parliament for the Ioannina constituency. He started his first term in the Parliament on 18 May 1989, and resigned 11 September 1993 from the Parliament. He was elected to the European Parliament in the 1999 European Parliament election in Greece, placing 9th on his party ballot. He served one term.
