= Zacharopoulos =

Zacharopoulos is a surname. Notable people with the surname include:

- Christos Zacharopoulos, Greek musician
- Denys Zacharopoulos (born 1952), Greek historian and theorist
- Emilianos Zacharopoulos (1915–2011), Eastern Orthodox metropolitan bishop
- Giorgos Zacharopoulos (born 1971), Greek footballer
