= Panagiotis Pipinelis =

Greek politician and diplomat

- Παναγιώτης Πιπινέλης
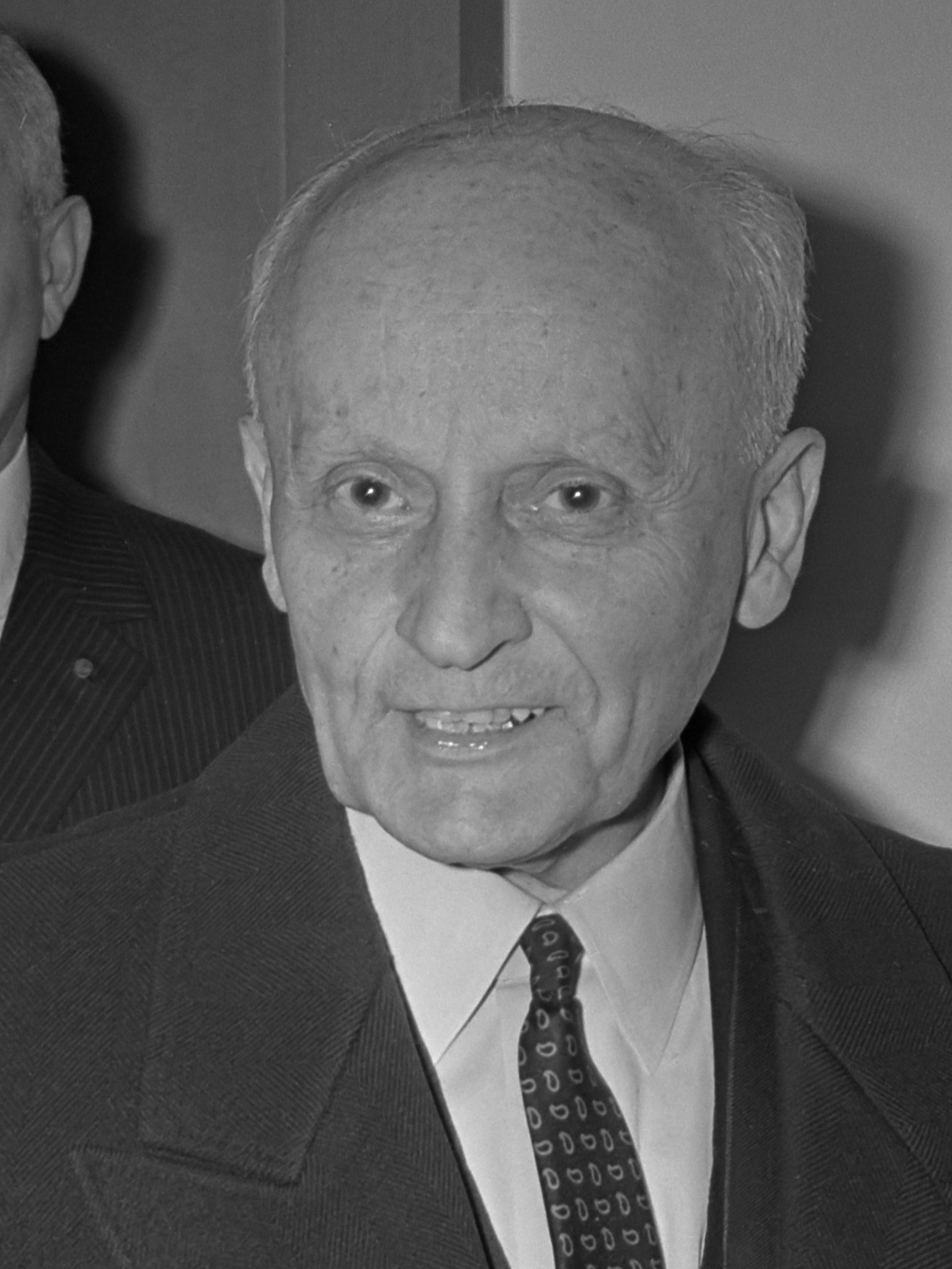

Prime Minister of Greece
- In office 19 June 1963 – 28 September 1963
- Monarch: Paul
- Preceded by: Konstantinos Karamanlis
- Succeeded by: Stylianos Mavromichalis

Minister of Foreign Affairs
- In office 20 November 1967 – 19 July 1970
- Prime Minister: Konstantinos Kollias; Georgios Papadopoulos
- Preceded by: Konstantinos Kollias
- Succeeded by: Georgios Papadopoulos
- In office 19 June 1963 – 28 September 1963
- Prime Minister: Himself
- Preceded by: Evangelos Averoff
- Succeeded by: Pavlos Oikonomou-Gouras
- In office 7 January 1950 – 22 March 1950
- Prime Minister: Ioannis Theotokis
- Preceded by: Konstantinos Tsaldaris
- Succeeded by: Sofoklis Venizelos

Personal details
- Born: 21 March 1899 Piraeus, Kingdom of Greece
- Died: 19 July 1970 (aged 71) Athens, Greece
- Party: Greek Rally; National Radical Union
- Spouse: Alexandra Ntikson (Αλεξάνδρα Ντίκσον)
- Education: University of Zurich; University of Fribourg

Panagiotis Pipinelis (Greek: Παναγιώτης Πιπινέλης; 21 March 1899 – 19 July 1970) was a Greek politician and diplomat.

He was born on 21 March 1899 in the port city of Piraeus. He studied Law and Political science at the University of Zurich and, in 1920, at the Albert Ludwigs University of Freiburg in Germany.

He entered the Greek diplomatic corps in 1922 and served in several posts, rising to Permanent Vice Minister for Foreign Affairs in 1947–1948. In 1952 he was appointed permanent representative of Greece to NATO, and resigned from the diplomatic service the next year. He served as Minister for Trade in the 1961–1963 Konstantinos Karamanlis cabinet and, following Karamanlis' resignation and self-exile, Pipinelis served briefly as an interim Prime Minister of Greece from 17 June 1963 to 29 September 1963. On 20 November 1967 he was appointed as Minister of Foreign Affairs during the dictatorship. He held the post until his death from a heart attack on 19 July 1970 in Athens, aged 71.

Political offices
Preceded by Konstantinos Karamanlis	Prime Minister of Greece; 19 June–29 September 1963	Succeeded by Stylianos Mavromichalis
