= Ioannis Paraskevopoulos =

Greek banker and politician

- Ιωάννης Παρασκευόπουλος

Prime Minister of Greece
- In office 22 December 1966 – 3 April 1967
- Monarch: Constantine II
- Preceded by: Stefanos Stefanopoulos
- Succeeded by: Panagiotis Kanellopoulos
- In office 30 December 1963 – 18 February 1964
- Monarch: Paul
- Preceded by: Georgios Papandreou
- Succeeded by: Georgios Papandreou

Personal details
- Born: 25 December 1900 Lavda, Elis, Greece
- Died: 8 April 1984 (aged 83)
- Party: Independent

Ioannis Paraskevopoulos (Greek: Ιωάννης Παρασκευόπουλος; 25 December 1900 – 8 April 1984) was a Greek banker and politician who served twice as interim Prime Minister of Greece during the 1960s. He was born in Lavda, Elis.

== Governmental ministry positions ==
As a minister, he was part of the governments of Archbishop Damaskinos Papandreou from 17 October 1945 to 1 November 1945. From October 1952 to 19 November 1952, he served as Prime Minister under Dimitrios Kiousopoulos.

From 31 December 1963 to 19 February 1964 and from 22 December 1966 to 3 April 1967, Paraskevopoulos himself served as Prime Minister of interim governments.

Political offices
Preceded by Georgios Papandreou	Prime Minister of Greece (caretaker); 30 December 1963 – 18 February 1964	Succeeded by Georgios Papandreou
Preceded by Stefanos Stefanopoulos	Prime Minister of Greece (interim); 22 December 1966 – 3 April 1967	Succeeded by Panagiotis Kanellopoulos
Preceded by Stavros Kostopoulos	Minister for National Defence of Greece; 22 December 1966 – 30 March 1967	Succeeded by Panagis Papaligouras
