= Evangelos Averoff =

Greek politician and author

- Ευάγγελος Αβέρωφ
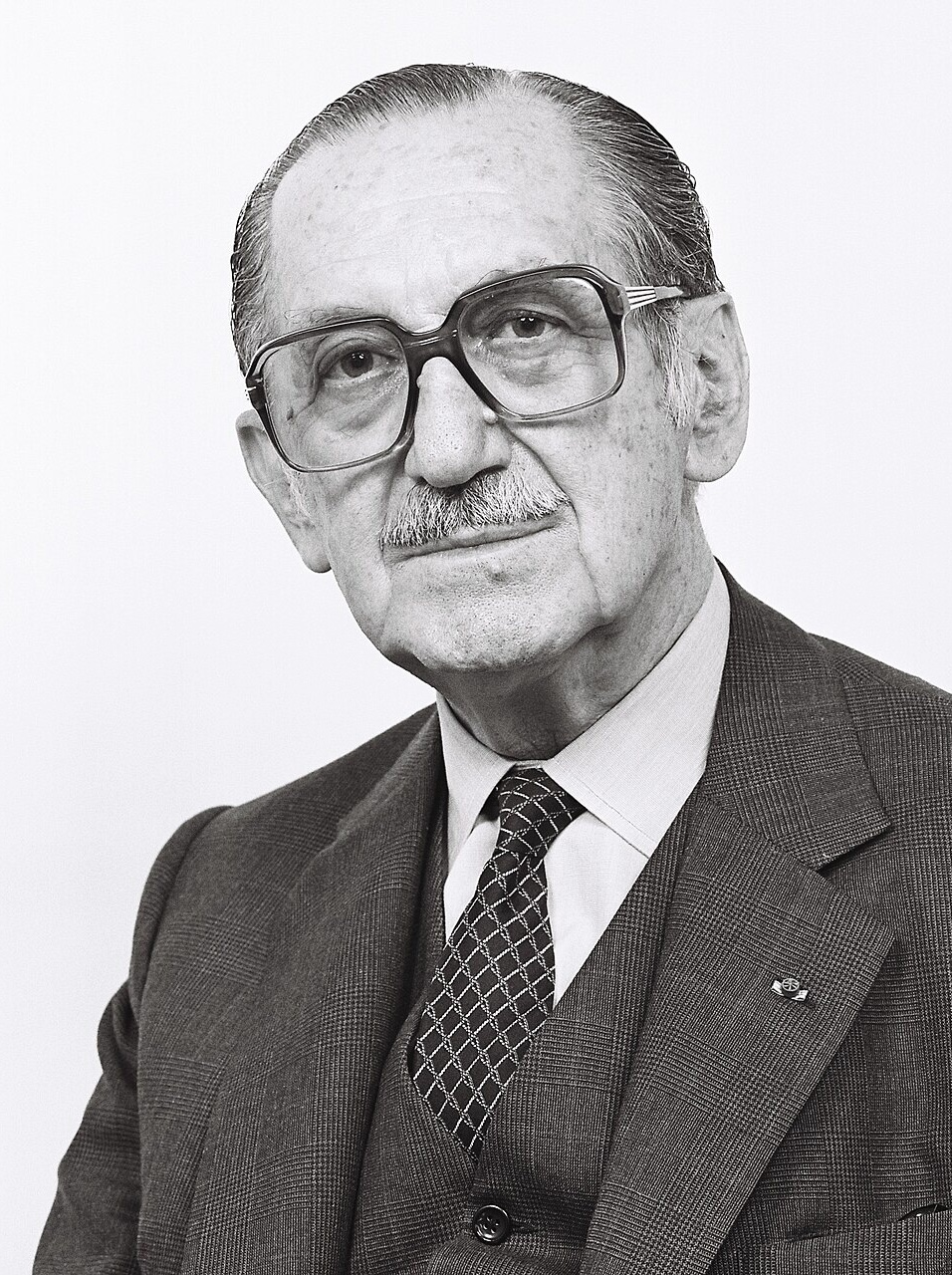
- Averoff as MEP, 1984

Leader of the Opposition
- In office 9 December 1981 – 1 September 1984
- Prime Minister: Andreas Papandreou
- Preceded by: Georgios Rallis
- Succeeded by: Konstantinos Mitsotakis

President of New Democracy
- In office 9 December 1981 – 1 September 1984
- Preceded by: Georgios Rallis
- Succeeded by: Konstantinos Mitsotakis

Deputy Prime Minister of Greece
- In office 29 June 1981 – 21 October 1981 Serving with Konstantinos Papakonstantinou
- Prime Minister: Georgios Rallis
- Preceded by: Konstantinos Papakonstantinou
- Succeeded by: Ioannis Charalampopoulos (1985)
Ministerial Portfolios
Minister of National Defence
In office 24 July 1974 – 21 October 1981
Prime Minister	Konstantinos Karamanlis; Georgios Rallis
Preceded by	Efstathios Latsoudis
Succeeded by	Andreas Papandreou
Minister of Agriculture
In office 3 April 1967 – 21 April 1967
Prime Minister	Panagiotis Kanellopoulos
Preceded by	Nikolaos Christodoulou
Succeeded by	Alexandros Matthaiou
In office 29 February 1956 – 28 May 1956
Prime Minister	Konstantinos Karamanlis
Preceded by	Konstantinos Papakonstantinou
Succeeded by	Andreas Apostolidis
In office 21 August 1950 – 28 August 1950
Prime Minister	Sofoklis Venizelos
Preceded by	Dimitrios Chatzigiannis
Succeeded by	Andreas Lampropoulos
Minister of Foreign Affairs
In office 4 November 1961 – 19 June 1963
Prime Minister	Konstantinos Karamanlis
Preceded by	Michail Pesmazoglou
Succeeded by	Panagiotis Pipinelis
In office 17 May 1958 – 20 September 1961
Prime Minister	Konstantinos Karamanlis
Preceded by	Michail Pesmazoglou
Succeeded by	Michail Pesmazoglou
In office 28 May 1956 – 5 March 1958
Prime Minister	Konstantinos Karamanlis
Preceded by	Spyros Theotokis
Succeeded by	Michail Pesmazoglou
Minister of Public Works
In office 19 March 1952 – 10 April 1952
Prime Minister	Nikolaos Plastiras
Preceded by	Theodoros Chavinis
Succeeded by	Pavlos Ntentidakis
Minister of Supply and Distribution
In office 9 November 1950 – 28 January 1951
Prime Minister	Sofoklis Venizelos
Preceded by	Kosmas Alexandridis (acting)
Succeeded by	Stavros Kostopoulos (as Provisional Minister of Commerce)
In office 21 August 1950 – 3 November 1950 (Note: Provisional until 4 September 1950)
Prime Minister	Sofoklis Venizelos
Preceded by	Konstantinos Manetas
Succeeded by	Kosmas Alexandridis (acting)
In office 20 January 1949 – 6 January 1950
Prime Minister	Themistoklis Sofoulis; Alexandros Diomidis
Preceded by	Dimitrios Gontikas
Succeeded by	Ioannis Papakyriakopoulos
Minister of National Economy
Provisional; 9 November 1950 – 28 January 1951
Prime Minister	Sofoklis Venizelos
Preceded by	Stavros Kostopoulos (provisional)
Succeeded by	Georgios Pezopoulos (1971)
In office 21 August 1950 – 3 November 1950
Prime Minister	Sofoklis Venizelos
Preceded by	Ioannis Melas
Succeeded by	Stavros Kostopoulos (provisional)
In office 27 March 1950 – 15 April 1950
Prime Minister	Sofoklis Venizelos
Preceded by	Ioannis Papakyriakopoulos; Grigorios Kasimatis (provisional)
Succeeded by	Ioannis Melas

Personal details
- Born: 17 April 1910 Trikala, Greece
- Died: 2 January 1990 (aged 79) Athens, Greece
- Party: Liberal Party; Greek Rally; National Radical Union; New Democracy
- Relations: Ioannis Averoff (nephew)
- Children: 2

Evangelos Averoff-Tossizza (Greek: Ευάγγελος Αβέρωφ Τοσίτσας) (Trikala, 17 April 1910 – Athens, 2 January 1990) was a Greek politician, leader of the New Democracy party (1981–1984), member of parliament, and author.

== Life and work ==
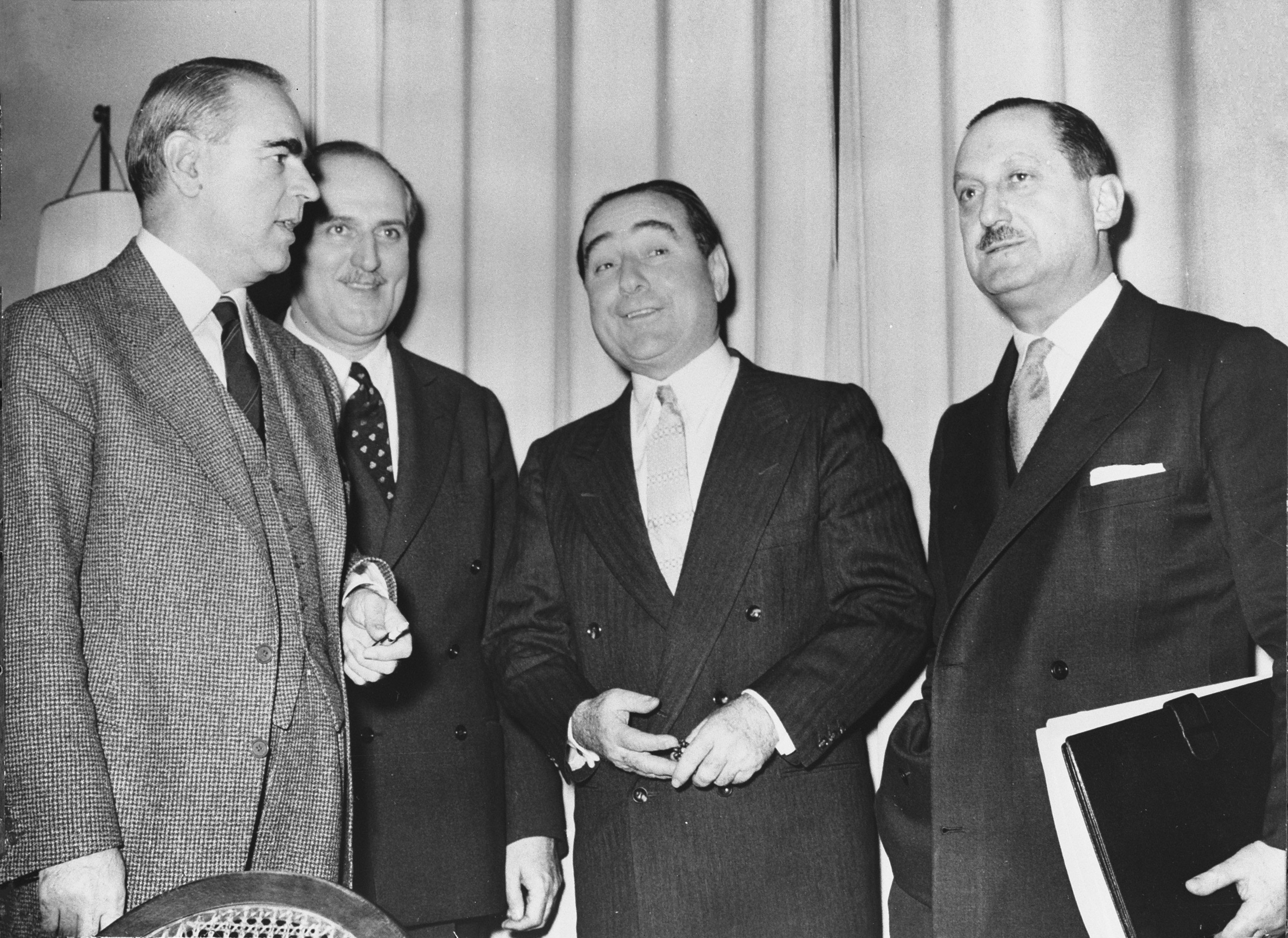
From left to right: Greek Prime Minister Konstantinos Karamanlis, Turkish Foreign Minister Fatin Rüştü Zorlu, Turkish Prime Minister Adnan Menderes, and Greek Foreign Minister Evangelos Averoff in 1959.

Evangelos Averoff was an Aromanian. Averoff got involved in public matters from very early on in his life and played a major role in Greek politics for almost 50 years. In 1940 he was appointed Prefect (regional governor) of Kerkyra (Corfu). During the Axis occupation of Greece, Averoff was taken hostage and imprisoned in Italy. This was because of his efforts to deter prominent Aromanian families from collaborating with the Italian occupation forces in the region of the Pindus during the times of the collaborationist Principality of the Pindus. Averoff escaped a year later and created the "Freedom or Death" resistance group, which aimed to liberate Greek and Allied war hostages. In 1946, he was elected to the Greek Parliament as a representative of Ioannina and then went on to serve as deputy minister and minister of Supply, Economy and Agriculture. From 1956 to 1963 he served as Foreign Minister.

During the Greek military junta of 1967-1974, Averoff participated in one of the foremost acts of resistance against the government, the Velos mutiny, for which he was arrested as an "instigator". After the restoration of democracy in 1974 during metapolitefsi, Averoff participated in the New Democracy centre-right party under Konstantinos Karamanlis and served as Minister of National Defense in subsequent governments. Following the defeat in the 1981 Greek legislative election and Georgios Rallis' resignation as party President, Averoff was elected President of the New Democracy party, which was then the Major Opposition in Parliament. Following the 1984 European Parliament election, he resigned citing health reasons and was subsequently declared an Honorary President. Parallel to his political career he became a prominent author of novels, short stories, theatrical plays, essays and historical analyses.

Evangelos Averoff was a prominent author of political and historical works, such as "Customs Union in the Balkans" (1933), which the Carnegie Institute awarded, "Fire and Axe, 1944–1949" (1974) dealing with the Greek Civil War, and "A History of missed opportunities: The Cypriot Problem 1956–1963" (1981). He died on 2 January 1990 at the age of 79.

== Historical tradition ==
For the Aromanians of Metsovo, Evangelos Averof is the last representative of a long tradition of local benefactors. He played a leading role in the founding of the Foundation of Baron Michael Tositsas, which he ran for 40 years, thus contributing greatly to the contemporary development of the town of Metsovo. Fulfilling the wish of Baron Michael Tossizza that the President of the Foundation bear his family name, he then added the surname Tossizza to his surname.

== Evangelos Averof Foundation ==
He also founded the Evangelos Averof-Tositsas Foundation, to which he donated his significant personal collection of paintings by Greek artists of the 19th and early 20th century and built a gallery in Metsovo to house it. At the same time he invested in local vineyards cultivating the abandoned lands of Metsovo and creating a contemporary winery. After his death (1990) the people of Metsovo honored him by placing his statue in the town's central square.

== Critics ==
In her best-selling book, A Man, Italian journalist Oriana Fallaci accused Averoff of threatening to kill Greek MP Alexandros Panagoulis a few days before Panagoulis' death in a car accident in Athens. According to Oriana Fallaci, Averoff represented the link between the Greek Junta and the political system during the transition period following Metapolitefsi. In particular, Fallaci claims that Panagoulis was in possession of secret documents showing Averoff's direct involvement in brokering the transition from the Joannides Junta to a national unity government led by Konstantinos Karamanlis, keeping himself in charge of managing the relations between the democratic system and the Armed Forces. Averoff's instrumental role in bringing about the appointment of Konstantinos Karamanlis has been confirmed by multiple sources, and Averoff became the Minister of Defense in the 1974 transition government. According to Fallaci, other secret documents showed that Averoff had not taken part in the Greek Resistance during World War II, but instead had been a collaborator of the Italian occupation troops as well as one of the conspirators behind the Velos Mutiny in 1973, after which he apparently collaborated with the Junta and, as a result of his cooperation, was acquitted without charges.

== Sources ==
- Evaggelos Averof-Tositsas 1908–1990, Evangelos Averoff-Tossizza Foundation, Metsovo 2000.
- E. Chatzivasileiou, Evaggelos Averof Tositsas 1908–1990 – Political biography, Publ. I. Sideri, Athens
- E. Averof – Tositsa, Me logismo kai m’oneiro, publ. Evangelos Averoff-Tossizza Foundation, 1991
- G. Plataris, To Simeiomatari enos Metsoviti [The diary of a Metsovian], 1871–1943, Athens 1972, pp. 288–290

== Notes ==
Political offices
Preceded by Efstathios Latsoudis	Minister for National Defence of Greece; 26 July 1974 – 19 October 1981	Succeeded by Andreas Papandreou
Party political offices
Preceded by Georgios Rallis	President of New Democracy; 1981–1984	Succeeded by Konstantinos Mitsotakis
