= Pavlos Oikonomou-Gouras =

Greek politician and diplomat

Pavlos Oikonomou-Gouras (Greek: Παύλος Οικονόμου-Γκούρας, 3 November 1897 – 27 April 1991) was a Greek diplomat and thrice Minister for Foreign Affairs of Greece.

Pavlos Oikonomou-Gouras descended from a wealthy family from the village of Goura, Corinthia that had taken part in the Greek War of Independence. After studies in the University of Athens, he entered the Greek Diplomatic Corps in 1921. He served in various diplomatic posts in Iran, Portugal, Italy, Turkey, the United States, Brazil and South Africa, as well as serving as Permanent Representative of Greece to the United Nations in 1960–61.

He also served as Foreign Minister on the interim government of Stylianos Mavromichalis in 1963, in the 1966–1967 Ioannis Paraskevopoulos cabinet, and in the cabinet of Konstantinos Kollias following the establishment of the military junta on 21 April 1967, until his resignation on 3 November 1967. He died on 27 April 1991 at the age of 93.
