= Chrysanthos Mentis Bostantzoglou =

Greek political cartoonist, playwright, lyricist, and painter (1918–1995)

Chrysanthos Mentis Bostantzoglou (Greek: Χρύσανθος Μέντης Μποσταντζόγλου, Constantinople 1918 – 13 December 1995) and better known under the pen name of Bost (Μποστ), was a prolific Greek political cartoonist, playwright, lyricist and painter.

His satirical cartoons and caricatures appeared in many papers such as I Avgi, Tachydromos and Eleftherotypia. Their radical political character (he stood unsuccessfully for election for left-wing parties on several occasions) led to a number of lawsuits.

== Works ==
1944: "St Fanourios. Help through an understanding of the Chinese classics Gah-Chu and Wu-Svou-Ni"

1953: "Constantine Paleologos"

1959: "Sketches by Bost" (also published by Kastaniotis 1996 ISBN 960-03-1505-1)

1960: "My album"

1961: "Sketches and writings (First selection)"

1961: "The profession of my mother"

1963: "Don Quixote" (play)

1963: "Beautiful city" (play)

1964: "Fausta" (play)

1993: "Medea" (play)

1995: "Romeo and Juliet" (play)

1972: "Sketches and writings (Second selection)" (also published by Kastaniotis 1996 ISBN 960-03-1506-X)

1982: "Maria Pentagiotissa" (play)

1987: "40 years of Bost" (play)

1996: "Sketches 1973-4", publisher Kastaniotis 1996 ISBN 960-03-1507-8

1996: "Alilografeia me ton Kosta", publisher Nefeli ISBN 960-211-250-6

1998: "Short stories 1960-1965", publisher Hermes ISBN 960-320-076-X

== Bibliography ==
- "Bost", by Lalas, Thanasis, publisher Kastaniotis 1996 ISBN 960-03-1584-1
- Kaggelaris, N. (2016), "Sophocles' Oedipus in Mentis Bostantzoglou's Medea" [in Greek] in Mastrapas, A. N. – Stergioulis, M. M. (eds.) Seminar 42: Sophocles the great classic of tragedy , Athens: Koralli, pp. 74–81 .
- Kaggelaris, N. (2017), "Euripides in Mentis Bostantzoglou's Medea", [in Greek] Carpe Diem 2: 379-417 .
