= Dimitrios Skouzes =

Greek writer and politician

Dimitrios Skouzes (Greek: Δημήτριος Σκουζές; 1890–1972) was a Greek writer and interim mayor of Athens.

He was a scion of the notable Athenian Skouzes family. He studied law and worked at the National Bank of Greece. In 1945, he was awarded an honorary post in the Athens city council and became president of the city council until 1951. In 1949, he was interim mayor of Athens, deputizing for Ioannis Pitsikas. As an Infantry Lieutenant in the reserve, he participated in all wars from 1912 to 1940 (Balkan Wars, World War I, Asia Minor Campaign, Greco-Italian War), and he was also active in the Greek Resistance during World War II.

He also wrote books, Nostalgias (Νοσταλγίες, 1956) and Bygone Athens (Η Αθήνα που έφυγε, 1961). A bust of Dimitrios Skouzes has been erected at Skouzes Square, where his family house is located.
