= Stylianos Mavromichalis =

Greek politician (1899–1981)

- Στυλιανός Μαυρομιχάλης
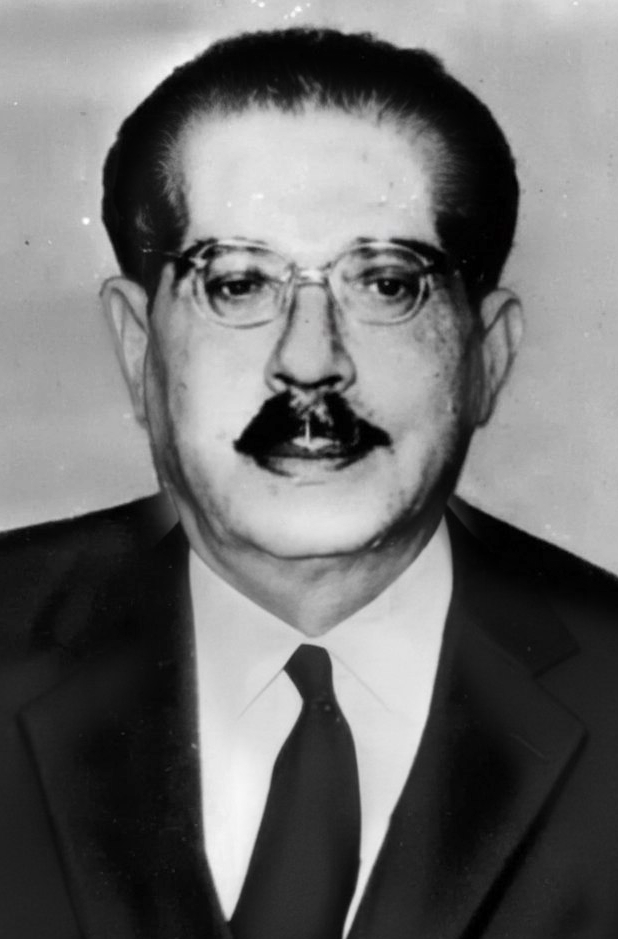
- Mavromichalis in 1963

Prime Minister of Greece
- In office 29 September 1963 – 8 November 1963
- Monarch: Paul
- Preceded by: Panagiotis Pipinelis
- Succeeded by: Georgios Papandreou

Personal details
- Born: 1 October 1899 Mani, Greece
- Died: 29 October 1981 (aged 82) Athens, Greece
- Party: Independent
- Relatives: Mavromichalis family

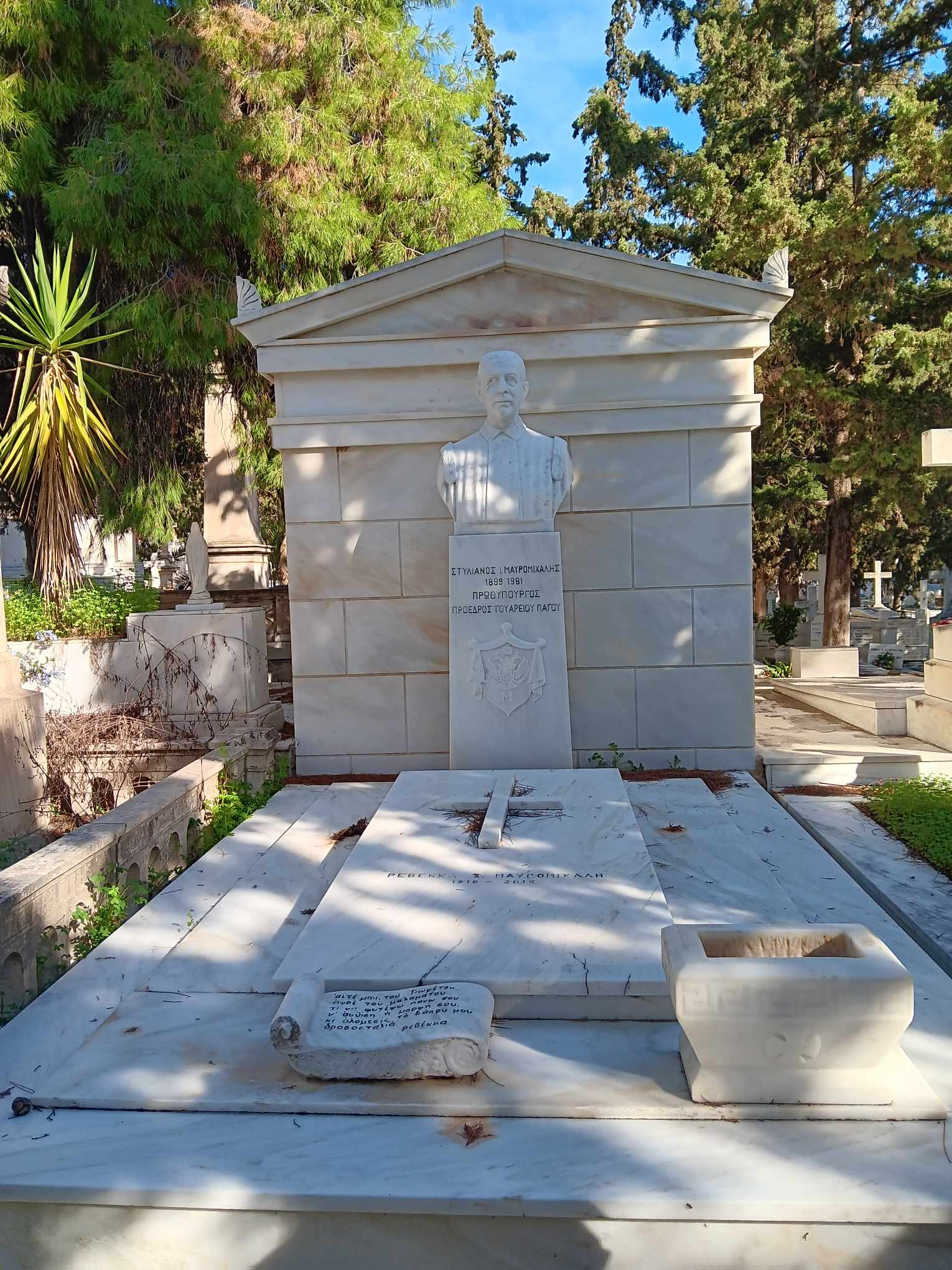
Tombstone of Stylianos Mavromichalis

Stylianos Mavromichalis (Greek: Στυλιανός Μαυρομιχάλης; 1 October 1899 – 29 October 1981) was a Greek politician and prime minister.

== Biography ==
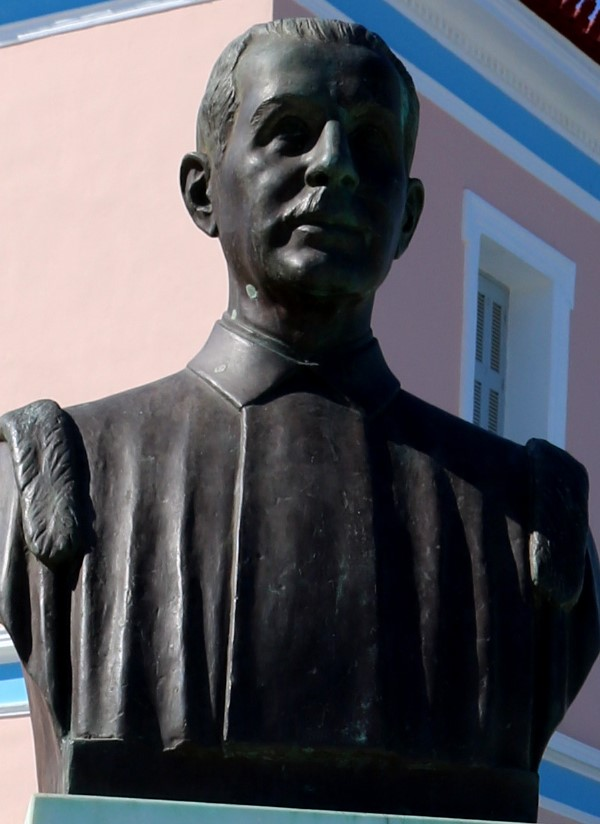
Bust of Stylianos Mavromichalis

Born in Mani, Mavromichalis was a descendant of Petrobey Mavromichalis, who participated in the Greek War of Independence.

Mavromichalis studied law and was president of the Areopagus (court of cassation; Greek: Άρειος Πάγος), the Supreme Court of Greece. He was prime minister for a very short period, from 29 September to 8 November 1963, of a transitional government. He died in Athens on October 29, 1981.

Political offices
Preceded by Panagiotis Pipinelis	Prime Minister of Greece (caretaker); 29 September – 8 November 1963	Succeeded by Georgios Papandreou
