= Stavros Kostopoulos =

Greek banker and politician (1900–1968)

Stavros Kostopoulos (Greek: Σταύρος Κωστόπουλος, 14 September 1900 – 23 June 1968) was a Greek banker and politician.

== Biography ==
He was born in Kalamata and he was the son of the banker Ioannis Kostopoulos. He attended the 1st Gymnasium in Kalamata. He studied law at the University of Athens and Political Sciences at the University of Paris, where he received his doctorate degree. He dealt with the banking industry, in which the family already had developed significant activity.

He was a member (1937–1951) and President (1951–1953) of the board of the Commercial Credit Bank. In 1951, he took over the direction of the National Bank of Greece, a position he held until 1953, when he was replaced by Kostis Iliaskos because of his disagreement on the merger of the Athens Bank with the National Bank.

== Political career ==
In 1928, he was elected for the first time a member of the parliament (MP) representing Messenia and was reelected in several elections until 1936. In the elections of 1946, he was reelected for the Liberal Party, gathering 2,491 votes. Overall, he was elected eleven times as MP. Having already come into conflict with Andreas Papandreou, during Iouliana of 1965, he was among the first members of the Centre Union to leave the party and became Minister of National Defence in the Georgios Athanasiadis-Novas government.

He was also Minister of Finance in the governments of Sophoklis Venizelos (August, September & November 1950), Minister of National Economy (1932 and 1947) in the governments of Eleftherios Venizelos and Dimitrios Maximos, Foreign Minister (1964–1965) in the government of Georgios Papandreou, Minister without Portfolio in the government of Sofoklis Venizelos, Interior Minister (1963) in the government of Georgios Papandreou, Minister of Defence (1965–1966) in the governments of Novas, Ilias Tsirimokos and Stefanos Stefanopoulos, Minister of Merchant Marine (1950) in the government of Plastiras, Minister of Supply and Distribution (1948) in Themistoklis Sofoulis’ government and Coordinating Minister (1950) again under Sophoklis Venizelos.

He died on June 23, 1968 in Athens, aged 67.
