= Alexandros Skouzes =

Greek politician

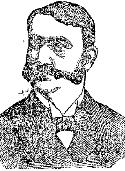
Alexandros Skouzes

Alexandros Skouzes (Greek: Αλέξανδρος Σκουζές; 1853–1937) was a Greek politician who served several times as Minister for Foreign Affairs of the Kingdom of Greece.

He was the son of Georgios Skouzes, of the notable Skouzes family from Athens, and was born there in 1853. He studied law and graduated by 1873, becoming a lawyer, while from 1873 to 1880, he worked as a diplomat. He was first elected as an MP for Attica in 1890, and served in the same post until 1912. He was also named Minister for Foreign Affairs in several cabinets of Theodoros Deligiannis, Dimitrios Rallis and Georgios Theotokis: from 31 May 1895 to 18 April 1897, from 24 November 1902 to 14 June 1903, from 16 December 1904 to 12 June 1905, and from 8 December 1905 to 21 June 1908. He died in Athens in 1937.
