= Theodoros Manolopoulos =

Greek physician and politician

Theodoros Manolopoulos (Greek: Θεόδωρος Μανωλόπουλος; Omvriaki, Xyniada, 1900 – 16 October 1981) was a Greek physician specialising in pathology, alumnus of the Department of Medicine of the University of Athens, who acted as MP, Μinister for Social Welfare, and Minister for Northern Greece.
