= Nikolaos Kalogeropoulos =

Greek politician (1851–1927)

- Νικόλαος Καλογερόπουλος
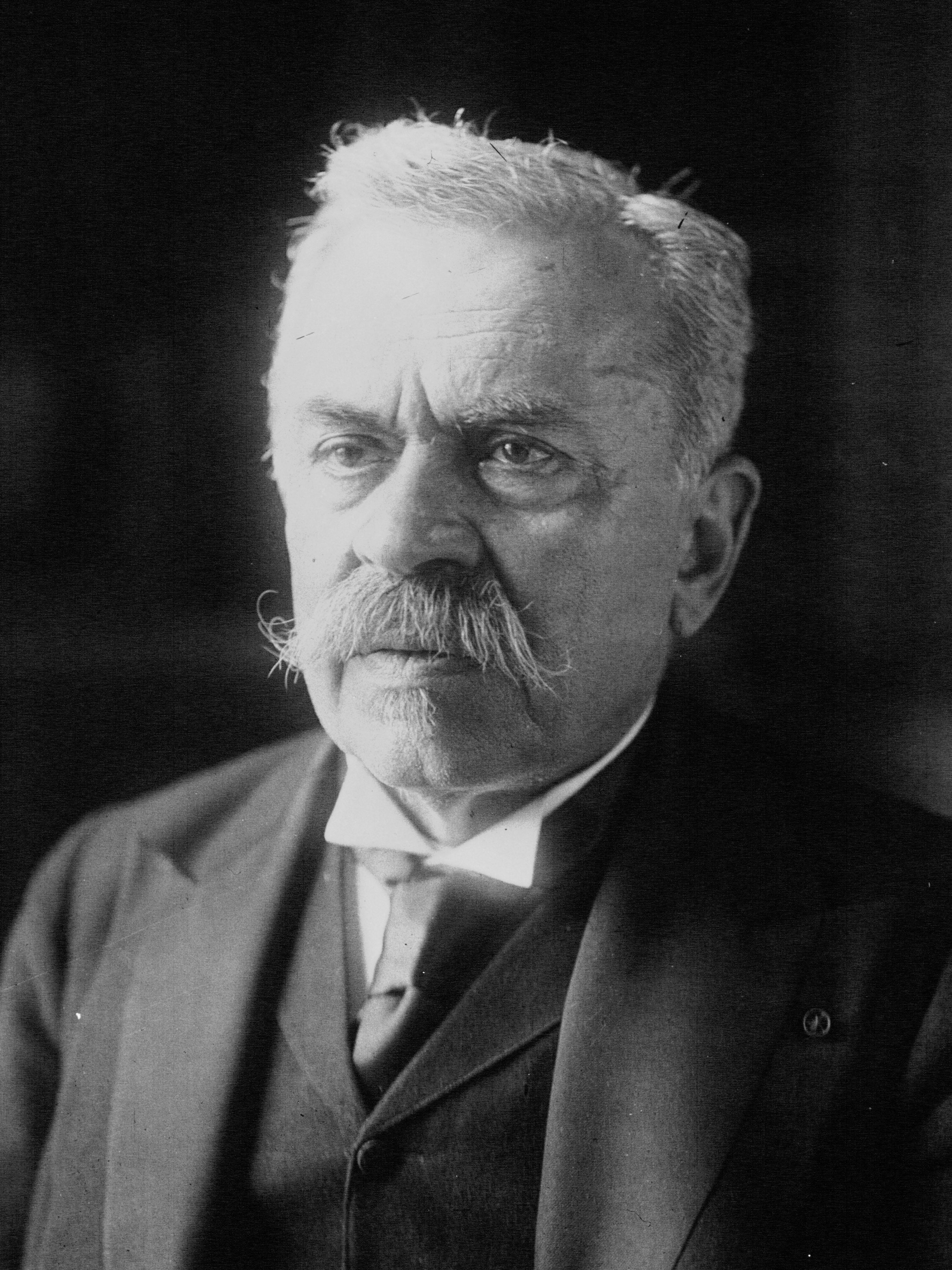

Prime Minister of Greece
- In office 24 January 1921 – 26 March 1921
- Monarch: Constantine I
- Preceded by: Dimitrios Rallis
- Succeeded by: Dimitrios Gounaris
- In office 3 September 1916 – 27 September 1916
- Monarch: Constantine I
- Preceded by: Alexandros Zaimis
- Succeeded by: Spyridon Lambros

Personal details
- Born: 23 July 1851 Chalkida, Euboea, Greece
- Died: 7 January 1927 (aged 75) Athens, Greece
- Party: People's Party

Nikolaos Kalogeropoulos (Greek: Νικόλαος Καλογερόπουλος; 23 July 1851 – 7 January 1927) was a Greek politician and briefly Prime Minister of Greece.

== Biography ==
Kalogeropoulos was born in Chalkida, Euboea, and studied law in Athens and Paris. He was elected a member of the Hellenic Parliament a total of ten times representing Euboea and served as minister in several conservative governments. He was associated with the People's Party after its formation in 1920.

He briefly served as prime minister twice. He died in Athens on 7 January 1927 at the age of 75.

Political offices
Preceded by Alexandros Zaimis	Prime Minister of Greece; 3–27 September 1916	Succeeded by Spyridon Lambros
Preceded by Dimitrios Rallis	Prime Minister of Greece; 24 January – 26 March 1921	Succeeded by Dimitrios Gounaris
