= Skouze Hill =

Skouze Hill Λόφος Σκουζέ
- Neighborhood
- Location within municipality of Athens
- Coordinates: 38°0′0″N 23°43′0″E
- Country: Greece
- Region: Attica
- City: Athens
- Postal code: 104 43, 104 44
- Area code: 210
- Website: www.cityofathens.gr

Skouze Hill (Greek: Λόφος Σκουζέ, pronounced [ˈlofos sku'ze]) is a small hill located in the 4th Municipal Unit of the Municipality of Athens, Greece. It is also the name of a small neighbourhood surrounding the hill.

In Antiquity, it was dedicated to and named after "Demeter Euchloös". Before the revolution of 1821 however, the Skouze family owned large properties in the area, which was consequently named after it. The name is preserved and is still in use today.

== District ==
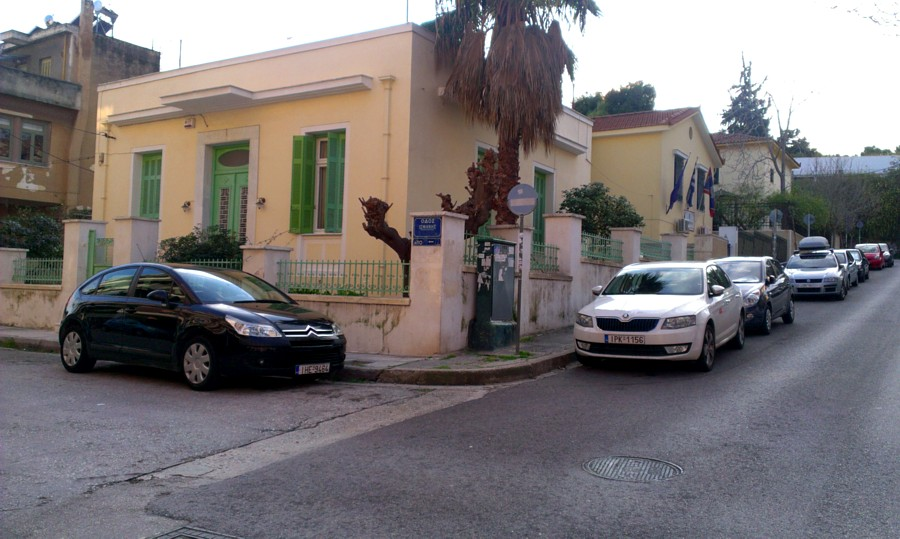
A view of the area

The district of Skouze Hill borders the districts of Kolonos, Sepolia, Akadimia Platonos and Kolokynthou. It is served by the Sepolia metro Station and many bus and trolley lines. At the top of the hill is the Church of Agios Emilianos, while the surrounding area is a meeting point for residents and visitors to the area.
