= Georgios Papoulias =

Greek politician and diplomat

- Γεώργιος Παπούλιας
- Born: 19 May 1927; Athens, Greece
- Died: 11 September 2009 (aged 82); Kolonaki, Athens, Greece
- Cause of death: apparent suicide by gunshot
- Education: University of Athens, Higher School of Commerce
- Occupations: politician and diplomat
- Known for: foreign minister of Greece
- Notable work: ambassador to France, Turkey and United States

Georgios Papoulias (Greek: Γεώργιος Παπούλιας; 19 May 1927, Athens – 11 September 2009, Kolonaki) was a Greek politician and diplomat. Papoulias briefly served as the Foreign Minister of Greece on two separate terms in 1989 and 1990.

Papoulias was born on 19 May 1927. He graduated from the Law School of the University of Athens, followed by studies at the Higher School of Commerce and Army service in 1950–1951 with the rank of Second Lieutenant. Papoulias entered the Greek Diplomatic Corps in 1955. His first foreign posting came in 1957, when he was sent to the Greek embassy in New Delhi. From there he was transferred to Bonn, where he remained until 1964 when he moved to the permanent Greek legation in Geneva. After a domestic stint as head of the Foreign Ministry's Political Affairs Department, in 1971 he became ambassador to France and Greece's Permanent Delegate to the UNESCO. Following the fall of the Greek military junta in 1974, he became Permanent Representative of Greece to the United Nations, a post he held until 1979. After that he served as ambassador in Ankara (Turkey) and, after 1983, Greek Ambassador to the U.S. in Washington DC. Papoulias' first term as Foreign Minister was in the Ioannis Grivas interim government from 12 October until 23 November 1989. He was re-appointed to the foreign ministry for a second time in the Xenophon Zolotas cabinet from 16 February until 11 April 1990.

Georgios Papoulias died from an apparent suicide by gunshot on September 11, 2009, at the age of 82, following serious health problems.
