= Panagiotis Zepos =

Panagiotis Zepos (Greek: Παναγιώτης Ζέπος, 1908–1985) was a Greek professor of law and a prominent lawyer, who served many times as secretary-general and minister in Greek governments.

== Biography ==
He was born in Athens and he was the son of lawyer Ioannis Zepos. His brother, Dimitris, was also a lawyer. After graduating from the Law School of the University of Athens, he attended master courses in University of Berlin. In 1931 he obtained a PhD in law from the University of Athens and three years later was elected reader in the Law School.

In 1939 he was elected assistant professor and, later, full professor in University of Thessaloniki. In 1954 he was elected professor of civil law in University of Athens, holding this position until 1974, when he retired.

In 1970 he was selected ordinary member of Athens Academy, of which he served as president in 1975.

He served as secretary-general in the Ministry of Justice (1935), secretary-general in the Ministry of Education (1945), and Minister of the Interior and Minister of National Education in the national unity cabinet of 1974 and Konstantinos Karamanlis' government in 1974–1976.

He died in 1985 in Athens and he is buried in the First Cemetery of Athens. He was survived by his wife and his daughter.
