= Georgios Athanasiadis-Novas =

Greek poet, lawyer and politician

- Γεώργιος Αθανασιάδης-Νόβας
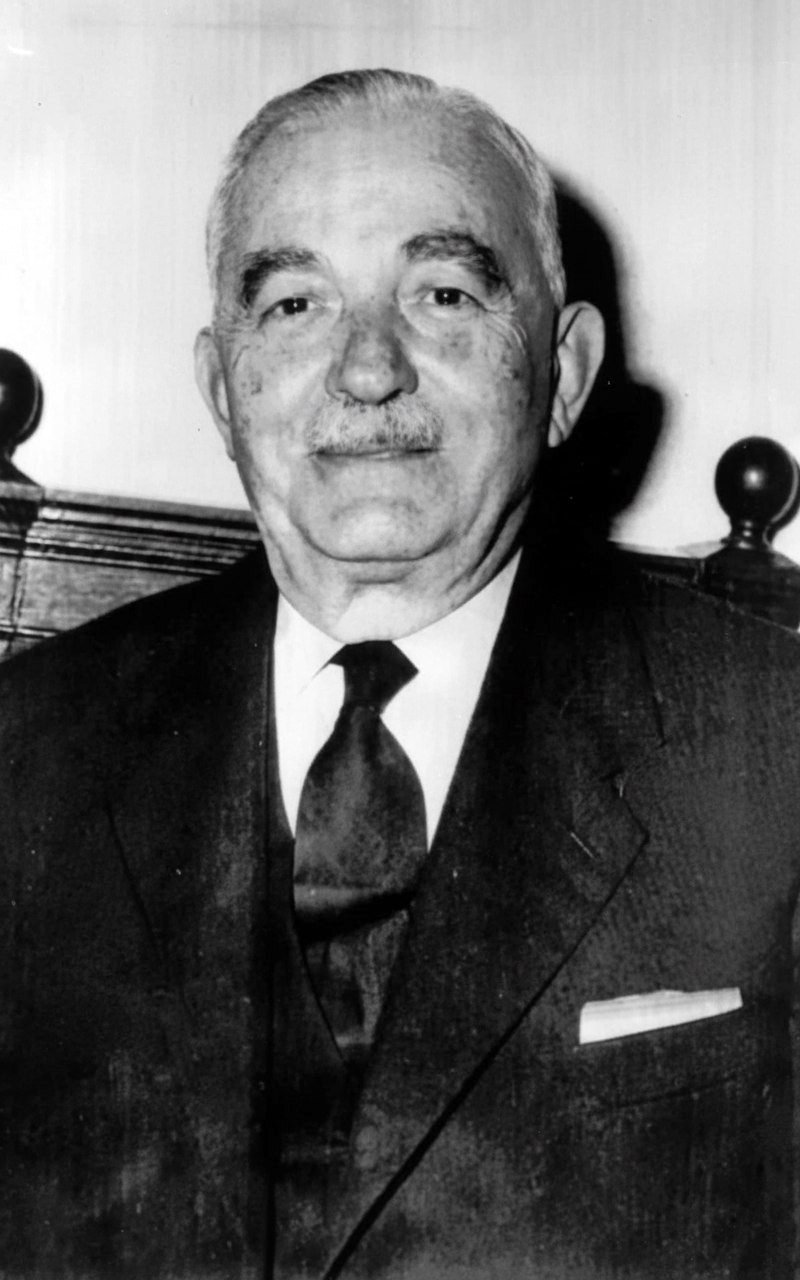
- Athanasiadis-Novas in 1965

Prime Minister of Greece
- In office 15 July 1965 – 20 August 1965
- Monarch: Constantine II
- Preceded by: Georgios Papandreou
- Succeeded by: Ilias Tsirimokos

Speaker of the Hellenic Parliament
- In office 19 March 1964 – 15 July 1965
- Monarch: Constantine II
- Preceded by: Ilias Tsirimokos
- Succeeded by: Dimitrios Papaspyrou

Personal details
- Born: 9 February 1893 Nafpaktos, Greece
- Died: 10 August 1987 (aged 94) Athens, Greece
- Party: Centre Union
- Education: University of Athens

Georgios Athanasiadis–Novas (Greek: Γεώργιος Αθανασιάδης-Νόβας; 9 February 1893 – 10 August 1987) was a Greek poet, lawyer and politician who briefly served as Prime Minister in 1965.

== Biography ==
George Athanasiadis-Novas, also known by his literary name Athanas, was born in Nafpaktos in 1894 and died in the same city in 1987. The origin of the Nova family is from Vista in Zagori, Epirus. In 1829, immediately after the liberation of Nafpaktos from the Turks, his great-grandfather Panagiotis, with his two brothers Alexis and Christodoulos, settled in the city because it was fortified and relatively safe. His mother, Evdokia, was the twelfth child of the parliament member Nikolaos G. Sismanis from Arachova Nafpaktia and the sole survivor of the Sismanis family from the murderous rampage of Ali Pasha. He obtained his law degree from the University of Athens. He was first elected to the Greek Parliament in 1926, representing his native prefecture of Aetolia-Acarnania, and was repeatedly elected to office until 1964.

A lawyer by trade, he served as Minister for the Interior in 1945, Minister for Education in 1950, and Minister for Industry in 1951.

In 1961, however, he was one of many conservatives who joined the Center Union (EK) in opposition to the corruption of right-wing governments at the time. In 1964, after EK came into power, he became Speaker of the Greek Parliament.

On 15 July 1965, he was appointed Prime Minister of Greece by king Constantine II after the latter dismissed Georgios Papandreou, a move that is known as Iouliana of 1965. He was followed by many EK conservatives, and, with support from conservative National Radical Union, MPs, tried to form a government but failed to get past a vote of confidence in parliament. He was replaced on August 20 of the same year.

In July 1974, he was one of the politicians who brokered the end of the Regime of the Colonels and the appointment of Constantine Karamanlis as prime minister.

From a young age, he was involved in literature under the pseudonym Athanas. He published poetry, short stories, philological and historical studies. In the field of prose, he published in 1918 the ethnographic short story "The green hat". In 1925, a collection of short stories, "Ten Loves," was published, and in 1932, a new collection of short stories, "Aploikes psyches," appeared. The last collection of his short stories, "Deep Roots," was published in 1956. The first three books were published by "I. Sideri" and the last by "Estia." His philological and historical studies were published in two volumes in 1998 under the editing of Athanasios Papathanasopoulos. In 1955, he was elected a member of the prestigious Academy of Athens. Most of Athanas' literary published work, which consists of 16 books, is lyric poetry. Renewed bucolicism and provincial urbanism are the main themes of his poetry. Dimaras, in his "History," states: " In his poems, G. Athanas has a strong relationship with the province. In his themes, one finds excellent lyrical and linguistic elements drawn from the Rumeli tradition". Despite this, he included his work in the Athenian poetic production, which was "the only one alive at present." Similar opinion has Linos Politis in a critical assessment in his book "History of Modern Greek Literature". Referring to the Roumeliotes lyricists Athanasios Kyriazis (1888-1950) and the younger G. Athanas, he states: "Both Roumeliotes, without looking for anything special or different, tenderly continue the orthodox Palamist tradition of verse and rhyme. Both (especially G. Athanas in his first most successful collections) give a certain freshness to the isolated provincial life of the country, which they render in a graphically idyllic way. The persistence of the Palamic tradition, somewhat out of place in the pre-war years, has become even more foreign in our era." According to Athanasios Papathanasopoulos, Athanas is not a bucolic poet. Of course, bucolics as a climate of the soul are present in his poetry, but they are so lightly diffused throughout his work and so subtly emphasized that they cease to have a significant meaning. Athanas is not a new version of Krystallis. He sang the world but also the soul of his province, but in its latest transformation, the urban one. From this point of view, Dimaras's relevant remark above is essential. The literary work of Athanas can be found on the website:

athanas-novas. gr

He died in Athens on 10 August 1987, aged 94.

== See also ==
- athanas-novas.gr

== Notes ==
Political offices
Preceded by Georgios Papandreou	Prime Minister of Greece; 1965	Succeeded by Ilias Tsirimokos
