= Ilias Tsirimokos =

Greek politician

- Ηλίας Τσιριμώκος

Prime Minister of Greece
- In office 20 August 1965 – 17 September 1965
- Monarch: Constantine II
- Preceded by: Georgios Athanasiadis-Novas
- Succeeded by: Stefanos Stefanopoulos

Personal details
- Born: 26 April 1907 Lamia, Kingdom of Greece
- Died: 13 July 1968 (aged 61) Athens, Kingdom of Greece

Ilias Tsirimokos (Greek: Ηλίας Τσιριμώκος, 26 April 1907 – 13 July 1968) was a Greek politician who served as Prime Minister of Greece for a very brief period (from 20 August 1965 to 17 September 1965).

== Life ==
He was born in Lamia in 1907. His father, Ioannis Tsirimokos, was also of a political background. Tsirimokos got involved in politics from a young age and was first elected to parliament in 1936 on the Liberal Party's ticket. During the Axis Occupation of Greece, he co-founded a small leftist party, the Union of People's Democracy (ELD). He served as its general secretary, while the distinguished law professor Alexandros Svolos served as its president. In 1941, ELD joined the National Liberation Front (EAM), and Tsirimokos gained a seat in EAM's central committee. In 1944, Tsirimokos was appointed as Secretary for Justice in the EAM-controlled Political Committee of National Liberation. However he resigned from that position on 2 December 1944 alongside 3 other left-wing cabinet members after pressure from the British Government.

In the 1950 elections, after the Greek Civil War, Tsirimokos was elected again into parliament, for Athens, on behalf of the renamed Socialist Party-Union of People's Democracy (SK-ELD). He was re-elected in the 1958 elections for the United Democratic Left, and again in 1961, 1963 and 1964 for the Center Union. In 1963, he was elected as Speaker of the Parliament. During the period of the Iouliana in the summer of 1965, Tsirimokos was chosen by King Constantine II to form a government. He failed to gain a vote of confidence, and was succeeded by Stefanos Stefanopoulos, in whose government he retained ministerial posts.

He died in Athens on 13 July 1968 at the age of 61.

Political offices
Preceded by Ioannis Toumbas	Interior Minister of Greece; 6 January 1965 – 15 July 1965	Succeeded by Ioannis Toumbas
Preceded by Georgios Athanasiadis-Novas	Prime Minister of Greece; 20 August 1965 – 17 September 1965	Succeeded by Stefanos Stefanopoulos
Preceded by Georgios Melas	Foreign Minister of Greece; 20 August 1965 – 14 April 1966	Succeeded by Stefanos Stefanopoulos (pro tempore)
Vacant Title last held by Stefanos Stefanopoulos (in the 1964–1965 Papandreou cabinet)	Deputy Prime Minister of Greece (with Georgios Athanasiadis-Novas); 17 September 1965 – 14 April 1966	Succeeded by Georgios Athanasiadis-Novas
