= Stefanos Stefanopoulos =

Greek politician (1898–1982)

- Στέφανος Στεφανόπουλος
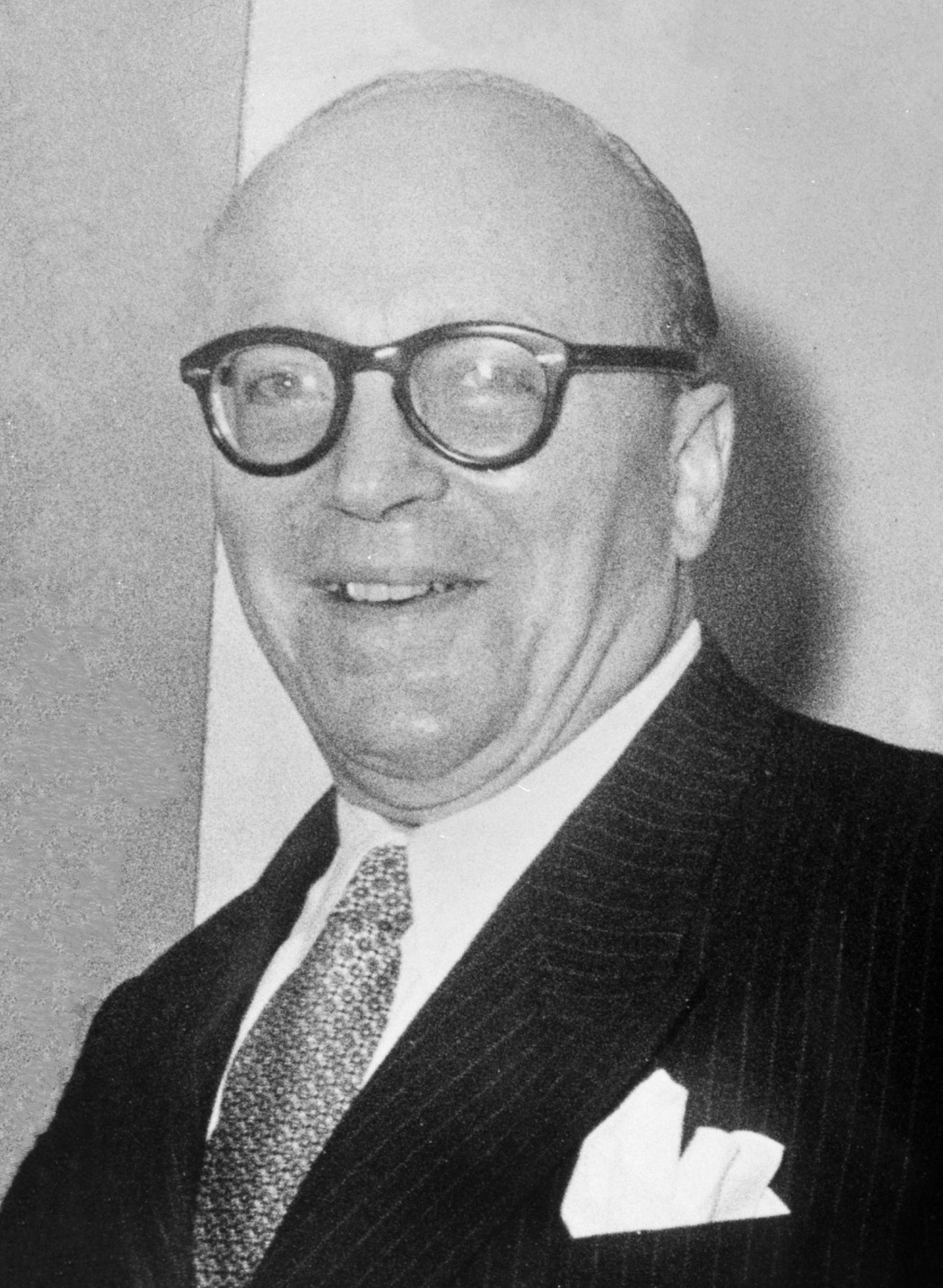

Prime Minister of Greece
- In office 17 September 1965 – 22 December 1966
- Monarch: Constantine II
- Preceded by: Ilias Tsirimokos
- Succeeded by: Ioannis Paraskevopoulos

Personal details
- Born: 3 July 1898 Pyrgos, Greece
- Died: 4 October 1982 (aged 84) Athens, Greece
- Party: Liberal Democratic Center

Stefanos Stefanopoulos (Greek: Στέφανος Στεφανόπουλος; 3 July 1898 – 4 October 1982) was a Greek politician, and served as Prime Minister of Greece from 1965 to 1966.

== Biography ==
Stefanopoulos was born in Pyrgos, Elis, Peloponnese region. He was a moderate conservative and served as foreign minister during Alexandros Papagos' government. He even served as acting Prime Minister for a day after the latter's death on 4 October 1955.

On 17 September 1965, he became Prime Minister of Greece during the period of Iouliana, supported by conservatives and defecting members of the Centre Union party. Unable to gain a parliamentary vote of confidence, his government fell on 22 December 1966. He stayed away from politics while the Greek military junta ruled 1967 until 1974. He tried to make a comeback into politics by forming a right-wing party, but failed to be elected in 1977.

He died from heart and respiratory issues, aged 84, in Athens.

Political offices
Preceded by Ilias Tsirimokos	Prime Minister of Greece; 17 September 1965 – 22 December 1966	Succeeded by Ioannis Paraskevopoulos
