= Andreas Stratos =

Greek lawyer, politician and historian (1905–1981)

Andreas N. Stratos (Greek: Ανδρέας Ν. Στράτος; 1905 – 30 August 1981) was a Greek lawyer, politician and historian. The son of Prime Minister of Greece Nikolaos Stratos, he was elected a member of the Hellenic Parliament continuously from 1932 to 1961, serving five times in cabinet posts as Minister for Labour (1946, 1954–55), Minister Governor-General of Northern Greece (1952–54) and Minister of Health and Social Welfare (1958–61, 1961–62). After retiring from politics he wrote the six-volume Byzantium in the 7th Century (Το Βυζάντιον στον Ζ' αιώνα, 1965–77), the first comprehensive study of the Byzantine state in that period.

== Life ==
Andreas Stratos was born in Athens in 1905, the son of Nikolaos Stratos and Maria Koromila. In November 1922, his father was tried and executed by the military government as one of those principally responsible for the Greek defeat against Turkey in the so-called "Asia Minor Disaster". In the virulent political atmosphere of the time, 17-year-old Andreas fled with his mother and sister, Dora, to Germany. The family was in dire financial situation, despite some help from his grandmother and Nikolaos Kalogeropoulos, forcing his mother to seek employment as a soprano singer as well as a dressmaker in various fashion designers. Andreas was able to study law and political sciences at the universities of Jena, Berlin, and Paris, where he also studied music in a conservatory.

In 1927, the family returned to Greece, and Andreas received his degree in law from the University of Athens. After finishing his military service, he became a lawyer, as well as securing an appointment in the legal department of the National Bank of Greece. The popularity of his father in his home province of Aetolia-Acarnania allowed him to stand for Parliament and win the seat for Aetolia-Acarnania in the 1932 elections with the People's Party, a feat he would repeat for ten consecutive elections until 1961.

Upon the outbreak of the Greco-Italian War in October 1940, he enlisted as a volunteer. He was re-elected with the People's Party in the first post-war elections in 1946, and became Minister for Labour in the interim cabinet of Panagiotis Poulitsas and the cabinets of Panagis Tsaldaris (13 April – 21 November 1946). Among his initiatives during this tenure were the foundation of the unemployment fund, wage increases for night-shifts, holidays and Sundays, and the establishment of summer camps for children of low-income working families.

In 1947, Stratos and further 18 MPs split off from the People's Party and Spyros Markezinis' New Party. In the 1950 elections, however, the New Party performed disastrously, and only Stratos was re-elected to Parliament. In 1951 he joined the Greek Rally of Marshal Alexander Papagos, being re-elected in the 1951 and 1952 elections. Stratos became Minister General-Governor of Northern Greece in the Papagos cabinet until 15 December 1954, when he was appointed Minister for Labour a second time, until the resignation of the Papagos cabinet on 6 October 1955, following the Marshal's death.

Despite suffering a heart attack which necessitated treatment in Paris, Stratos was again elected in absentia as MP for Aetolia-Acarnania in the February 1956 elections, now with the Greek Rally's successor, the National Radical Union. He then served as head of the Greek delegation to the 12th session of the United Nations General Assembly. Re-elected in 1958, he became Minister for Social Welfare throughout Konstantinos Karamanlis' third cabinet (17 May 1958 – 20 September 1961), and again after the 1961 elections from 4 November 1961 until his resignation on 20 December 1962.

After his resignation, Stratos retired from politics and devoted himself to his passion, the study of the Byzantine Empire. Although not a trained scholar, he was an avid enthusiast and participated in many international conferences on Byzantine studies and published many articles in international scholarly journals. Already in the early 1950s he had focused his interest on the 7th century, a transformative but until then neglected period in Byzantine history. The fruit of his research would be the six-volume Byzantium in the 7th Century (Το Βυζάντιον στον Ζ' αιώνα, Estia 1965–77), later translated into French and English, for which he received the Prize of the Academy of Athens in 1970.

Andreas Stratos died on 30 August 1981. Two volumes with collections of articles were published in his honour in 1986 by his fellow Byzantinists.

Political offices
Preceded by Stefanos Stefanopoulos (pro tempore)	Minister for Labour; 13 April – 21 November 1946	Succeeded by Konstantinos Karamanlis
Preceded by Sotirios Stergiopoulos	Minister Governor-General of Northern Greece; 19 November 1952 – 15 December 1954	Succeeded by Georgios Kosmas
Preceded by Eleftherios Gonis	Minister for Labour; 15 December 1954 – 6 October 1955	Succeeded by Stavros Polyzogopoulos
Preceded by Spyridon Malaspinas (interim)	Minister for Social Welfare; 17 May 1958 – 20 September 1961	Succeeded by Ioannis Charamis (interim)
Preceded by Ioannis Charamis (interim)	Minister for Social Welfare; 4 November 1961 – 20 December 1962	Succeeded by Konstantinos Tsatsos
