= Dimosthenis Theocharidis =

Greek lawyer and politician (1914–2019)

- Δημοσθένης Θεοχαρίδης
- Born: 10 July 1914; Agrapidies, Greece
- Died: 20 February 2019 (aged 104); Florina, Greece
- Occupations: Politician; lawyer
- Years active: 1951–1989
- Political party: New Democracy (1981–1989)
- Other political affiliations: EPEK (1951–1956); Centre Union (1961–1964); Centre Union – New Forces (1974–1977); EDIK (1977)
- Parents: Michael Theocharidis (father); Soultana Theocharidis (mother)

Dimosthenis Theocharidis (Greek: Δημοσθένης Θεοχαρίδης; 10 July 1914 – 20 February 2019) was a Greek lawyer and politician. He served as MP for Florina, with various parties, for many terms. He was elected for a total of eight terms, matching Georgios Andreadis's record.

== Career ==
He was born on 10 July 1914 in Agrapadies, the son of Michael and Soultana. He studied and practiced law.

He was elected MP for Florina with EPEK, in 1951 and 1952 and for Florina-Kastoria with EPEK (part of the Liberal Democratic Union coalition), in 1956. He was reelected for Florina with Centre Union, in 1961, 1963 and 1964. During the 1967-1974 dictatorship, he was arrested and imprisoned, in the prison of Marousi.

In 1974, after the fall of the dictatorship, he was a candidate MP for Florina with Centre Union – New Forces, getting 4,464 votes. In 1977, he again ran unsuccessfully in Florina, with the Union of the Democratic Centre.

He was reelected with New Democracy in 1981, with 7,007 votes and again in 1985.

He was also, as personally chosen by Karamanlis, General Secretary of Northern Greece.

== Death ==
Theocharidis died in the early hours of 20 February 2019, after a few days of hospitalization, aged 104. His funeral took place on 21 February 2019 and he was buried in the cemetery of his hometown. At the time of his death, at age 104, he was the oldest living politician of New Democracy.

== Bibliography ==
- Kostas Dingaves, The elections in Greece 1844-1985, Μαλλιάρης-Παιδεία, Thessaloniki 1986.
