= National Progressive Center Union =

National Progressive Centre Union Εθνική Προοδευτική Ένωση Κέντρου Ethniki Proodeftiki Enosis Kentrou
- Founder: Nikolaos Plastiras
- Founded: 1950
- Dissolved: 1961
- Merger of: Progressive Liberal Party; Democratic Progressive Party
- Merged into: Centre Union
- Ideology: Liberalism (Greek); Venizelism
- Political position: Centre

The National Progressive Centre Union (Greek: Εθνική Προοδευτική Ένωση Κέντρου (ΕΠΕΚ), romanized: Ethniki Proodeftiki Enosis Kentrou, EPEK) was a Greek Venizelist political party. It was founded in 1950 by Nikolaos Plastiras, and formed a government with other Centrist parties after the 1950 legislative election. It later formed another coalition government after the resignation of Sofoklis Venizelos as Prime Minister, and another one in 1951 with Venizelos. After Plastiras's death in 1953, the party continued to exist, but was subsumed into the Centre Union in 1961.

== History ==
EPEK was established on 14 January 1950 as an electoral alliance between ex-Prime Minister Emmanouil Tsouderos' Democratic Progressive Party (Dimokratikon Proodeftikon Komma) and General Nikolaos Plastiras' Progressive Liberal Party (Komma Proodeftikon Fileleftheron). King Paul was initially suspicious of Plastiras and his speeches indicated that he was prepared to give amnesty to the defeated Communists. Moreover, General Plastiras had had a stormy past with the royal family. Plastiras helped establish the Second Hellenic Republic in 1924 and twice - in 1933 and 1935 - tried to overthrow governments alleged to be plotting the restoration of the monarchy, though he now claimed to be fully reconciled with the dynasty.

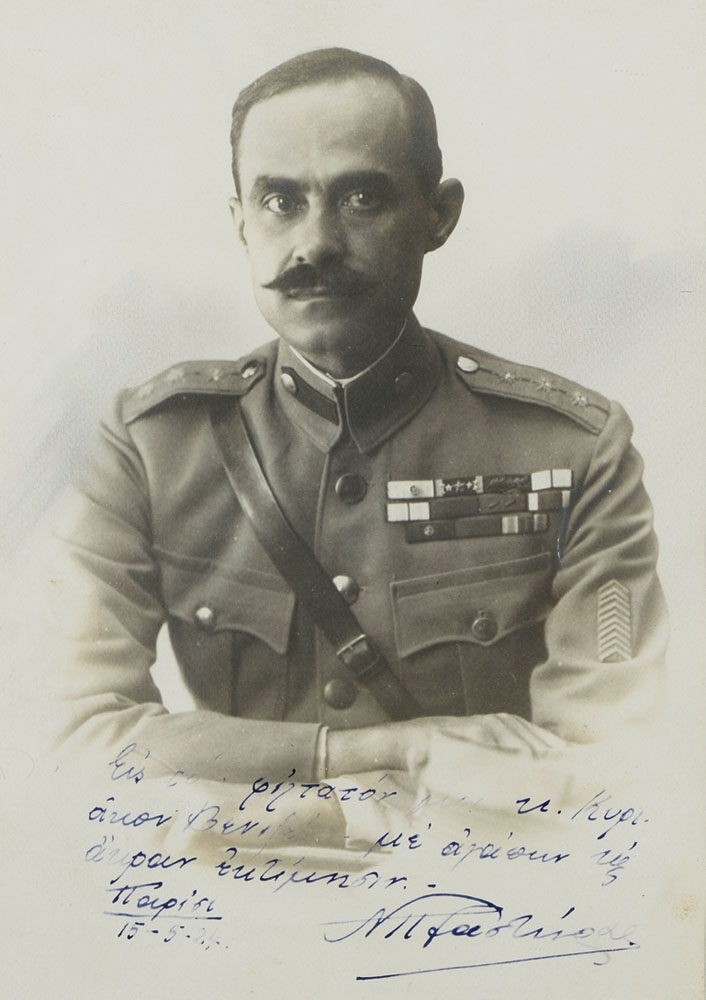
Nikolaos Plastiras c. 1924

The party served for Plastiras to enter the political scene in order to form a broader alliance around him. Indeed, immediately after its foundation, contacts with the other parties of the center began. As a result of the talks, on 13 January 1950, announced the electoral alliance between the ex-Prime Minister Emmanouil Tsouderos' Democratic Progressive Party under the name of "National Progressive Center Union" and the leadership of Plastiras. King Paul was initially suspicious of Plastiras and his speeches indicated that he was prepared to give amnesty to the defeated Communists. Moreover, General Plastiras had had a stormy past with the royal family. Plastiras helped establish the Second Hellenic Republic in 1924 and twice - in 1933 and 1935 - tried to overthrow governments alleged to be plotting the restoration of the monarchy, though he now claimed to be fully reconciled with the dynasty.

In the 1950 legislative election, no less than 44 parties contested under a system of proportional representation. EPEK received 16.4 per cent of the vote and 45 seats. The EPEK vote was particularly strong in impoverished refugee regions where Plastiras had a sizeable personal following who were mostly left-leaning anyway. The hung parliament that was conceived after the 5 March election made it so a coalition government would have to be formed to constitute a majority in parliament. The leaders of the three centrist parties - The Liberal Party, the Georgios Papandreou Party (the Democratic Socialists) and EPEK - sent a note to the King informing him that they had reached an agreement and could form a government:

We have the honour to inform Your Majesty that we, the undersigned party leaders constituting a majority in Parliament, have agreed to form a Government whose policy will be as defined in the attached Note.

Most importantly, the letter contained principles that all parties must follow, namely that all constituent parts must recognise Greece as a constitutional monarchy and that the Greek government must give its full support to the United Nations. The first problem regarding premiership of the centrist-led government first arose when the three parties began sponsoring different people. The Democratic Socialists led by Georgios Papandreou and EPEK both sponsored Plastiras, while the Liberal Party, the biggest single party of the three, sponsored its leader Sofoklis Venizelos. Venizelos formed a government instead, solely consisting of the Liberal Party and the small 'National Reconstruction Front.' Facing American pressure, Venizelos' government resigned and the King called on Plastiras, leader of the second largest party, to engineer a coalition government. Plastiras managed to get the Democratic Socialists and Liberals to participate and the three-party coalition was sworn in on 15 April with Plastiras at the helm. Members of coalition parties occupied cabinet positions: 6 EPEK, 5 Liberals and 5 Democratic Socialists.

It only lasted for four months until August, when this government fell. Nikolaos Plastiras wished to widen the scope of the leniency measures. However, his coalition partners were against any such advances. Plastiras began to frustratedly speak out against his colleagues and the Liberal element fully withdrew from Plastiras' government on 17 August. And so, Plastiras submitted his resignation. Venizelos formed a new Liberal-led cabinet with the 'National Reconstruction Party' in tow. Two days before the customary vote of confidence, EPEK withdrew support from the new government and the Venizelos government resigned after it failed to obtain the votes to carry on.

The election of 9 September 1951 was contested by 9 parties in a parliament of 258 seats under a system of 'reinforced' proportional representation. EPEK displaced the Liberal Party as the second largest party in parliament garnering 23.5 per cent of the vote and 74 seats. Meanwhile, the forces of the right had flocked to the standard of Alexandros Papagos' Greek Rally party which emerged as the largest party with 114 seats. King Paul met with the leaders of the three largest parties - Papagos, Plastiras and Venizelos - to discuss the formation of a government. Papagos, as leader of the largest party, was called on first, but he declined on the grounds that his party would not collaborate with the 'old order.' Then, Plastiras and Venizelos agreed to form a coalition government; between the two parties, they had 131 out of 258 seats in the chamber, which was just enough for a majority. Plastiras was once again sworn in as Prime Minister along with Venizelos, who was to be Foreign Minister and Vice-Premier. On 1 November, Plastiras won a confidence vote by 131 votes to 115. EPEK initiated a revision of the constitution, specifically granting women the vote, empowered the government to expropriate large estates for re-distribution to landless farmers and made provision for the Queen to act as regent in the King's absence. It rationalised succession laws which had previously been ambiguous as to whom the crown should be passed on to. By a technicality, it could be interpreted that Prince George (1869-1957) was rightfully King. The revised constitution was ratified by King Paul on 1 January 1952.

On 9 March 1952, Plastiras suffered a stroke and therefore could not carry out the duties of office. On 11 June, he left for special treatment in France and Sofoklis Venizelos picked up where Plastiras left off. On 10 August, Plastiras unexpectedly returned from France, claiming that his health was fully restored and that he could resume his duties. Though in his first audience with the King after returning, he seemed unable to concentrate and the Paul summoned and aide to steer the conversation. On 3 October, Parliament passed an Electoral Bill converting the system of proportional representation to a 'first-past-the-post' system which divided the country into 99 constituencies and increased the number of deputies from 258 to 300. Parliament dissolved on 9 October; accordingly, Plastiras submitted his resignation to Paul. In anticipation of the election (which discriminated against small parties), EPEK, the Liberals, and the much smaller Socialist Party - Union of People's Democracy (led by Alexandros Svolos) created an electoral alliance known as the 'Union of the Parties (Enosis Kommaton).' The alliance did little to prevent a Greek Rally landslide victory as the Greek Rally swept the election gaining 247 seats, to just EPEK's 24 and the Liberals' 27; Plastiras was even defeated in his Athens constituency.

Plastiras died on 26 July 1953 and was buried with full honours. Although EPEK continued to exist until it was absorbed into the Centre Union in 1961, it was no longer a forceful political element after General Plastiras died and never exceeded 15 seats in a national election under the leadership of Savas Papapolitis.

Hellenic Parliament
Election	%	Seats	+/–	Position	Government
1950	16.4%	45 / 250	▲54	▲3rd	Second Cabinet of Nikolaos Plastiras; Fifth Cabinet of Sophoklis Venizelos
1951	28.7%	74 / 300	▲20	▲2nd	Third Cabinet of Nikolaos Plastiras
1952	34.2% (In alliance the Liberal Party and Socialist Party - Union of People's Democracy)	24 / 300	▼50	▼3rd	loyal opposition
