= National Unionist Party (Greece) =

National Unionist Party Εθνικόν Ενωτικόν Κόμμα
- Leader: Panagiotis Kanellopoulos
- Founded: 1935
- Dissolved: 1950
- Merged into: People's Unionist Party
- Headquarters: Athens
- Ideology: Venizelism; Progressivism; Economic liberalism
- Political position: Centre to centre-right

National Unionist Party (Greek: Εθνικόν Ενωτικόν Κόμμα (ΕΕΚ), EEK) was a centre-right political party in Greece, founded in 1935 by Panagiotis Kanellopoulos and other Venizelist politicians.

== History ==
This party generally had democratic and progressive tendencies and was represented in the Greek Parliament in the post-war period, as emerged during the elections of 1946, as well as in the elections of 1950, with a small group of MPs.

In December 1950, the E.E.K. merged with a group of MPs led by Stefanos Stefanopoulos, who had split from the People's Party, creating the People's Unionist Party, which later joined the Greek Rally after a short period of time.

The party's publication was the newspaper Elliniki Foni (Greek Voice), where well-known academics and friends of Kanellopoulos, such as Konstantinos Despotopoulos, Phaidon Vegleris, and Ioannis Theodorakopoulos, later contributed as writers.

=== Greek Parliament ===
Year	Party Leader	Number of votes	Percentage of votes	Seats	Position
1936	Panagiotis Kanellopoulos	9.870	0,77%	0 / 300	11th Party; Out of Parliament
1946	Panagiotis Kanellopoulos	213.721 (N.P.U)	19,28% (N.P.U)	9 / 354	8th Party; Opposition
1950	Panagiotis Kanellopoulos	88.979 (N.R.F.)	5,27% (N.R.F.)	6 / 250	4th Party; Opposition
