= Panagis Tsaldaris =

Prime Minister of Greece (1932–35)

- Παναγής Τσαλδάρης
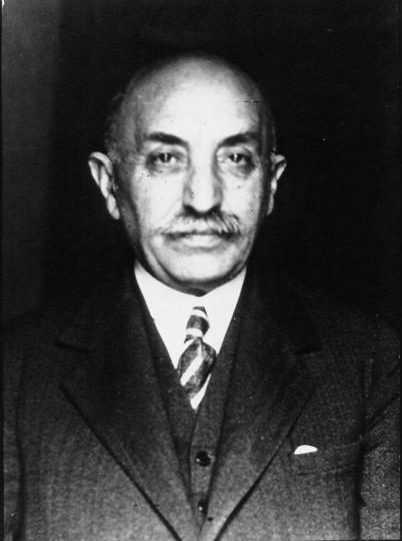

Prime Minister of Greece
- In office 10 March 1933 – 10 October 1935
- President: Alexandros Zaimis
- Preceded by: Alexandros Othonaios
- Succeeded by: Georgios Kondylis
- In office 4 November 1932 – 16 January 1933
- President: Alexandros Zaimis
- Preceded by: Eleftherios Venizelos
- Succeeded by: Eleftherios Venizelos

Personal details
- Born: Panagiotis Tsaldaris; 5 March 1868 Corinth, Greece
- Died: 17 May 1936 (aged 68) Athens, Greece
- Party: People's Party
- Spouse: Lina Tsaldari
- Education: School of Law, National and Kapodistrian University of Athens

Panagis Tsaldaris (also Panagiotis Tsaldaris or Panayotis Tsaldaris; Greek: Παναγιώτης (Παναγής) Τσαλδάρης; 5 March 1868 – 17 May 1936) was a Greek politician who served as Prime Minister of Greece twice. He was a revered conservative politician and leader for many years (1922–1936) of the conservative People's Party in the period before World War II. He was the husband of Lina Tsaldari, a Greek suffragist, member of Parliament, and the Minister for Social Welfare.

== Early life ==
Tsaldaris was born in 1868 in Kamari, near Corinth in the Peloponnese. He studied in the Law School of the University of Athens and, being an excellent student, he continued his studies abroad, among other places in Berlin and Paris. After he returned to Greece, he worked as a lawyer. Because of his expertise as an advocate, he gained the respect of his colleagues.

In 1919, Tsaldaris married the daughter of the university professor (and later Prime Minister of Greece) Spyridon Lambrou, Lina Tsaldaris, who stood by him during all his life and remained politically active, even after her husband's death.

== Entering politics ==
Tsaldaris entered politics in 1910, when he was elected for the first time to the Parliament for Corinth. He would be successively reelected to Parliament until his death in 1936. In 1915, he sided with King Constantine I in the latter's conflict with Eleftherios Venizelos (see national Schism) and became Minister of Justice in Dimitrios Gounaris's government. Nonetheless, after the return of Venizelos and the self-exile of the King in 1917, Panagis Tsaldaris was imprisoned and then exiled in various islands of the Aegean Sea.

After the legislative elections of 1920, which resulted in an unexpected victory for the People's Party, Tsaldaris served in the governments of Dimitrios Rallis and Nikolaos Kalogeropoulos as Interior Minister and Minister of Public Transport. In the government of Dimitrios Gounaris he served once again as Minister of Public Transport.

== Leader of the People's Party ==
After the execution of the People's Party's leader Dimitrios Gounaris, Tsaldaris was elected by the party members as their leader in 1922. In the elections of 1923 the party didn't take part and Tsaldaris protested against the persecution of right-wing politicians. In the plebiscite of 1924, he supported King George II.

During the Pangalos dictatorship, Tsaldaris refused to collaborate with the general's regime. After the elections of 1926, Tsaldaris participated in the government of national unity of Alexandros Zaimis (as minister of National Economy, of Education and of Interior Affairs), but he submitted his resignation in August 1927, because of a disagreement concerning the currency policy of the government.

During the 1928–1932 government of the Liberal Party and of its leader, Eleftherios Venizelos, Panagis Tsaldaris was leader of the Opposition, as the leader of the second biggest party Parliament. In 1932, he turned down Venizelos' proposition to lead a government of national unity.

== Premierships ==
=== First premiership ===
Panagis Tsaldaris formed his first government in 1932, along with Georgios Kondylis and Ioannis Metaxas, after he had first officially recognized the outcome of the plebiscite of 1924 which established the Second Hellenic Republic. Nevertheless, his government was overturned and Tsaldaris formed a new government on 10 March 1933 after his victory in the elections of 1933.

=== Second premiership ===
In his second premiership, Tsaldaris cooperated once again with Georgios Kondylis and Ioannis Metaxas. He confronted with success the military movement of Nikolaos Plastiras, but because of this crisis an interim government under the leadership of Lieutenant General Alexandros Othonaios was appointed. The reputation of his government was, nevertheless, tarnished, because of the assassination attempt against Eleftherios Venizelos. Tsaldaris had no involvement and condemned the criminal attack, but members of his party and close supporters were deemed responsible for the assault. At the same time, three prominent members of the People's Party expressed their support for the monarchy and the exiled George II. Tsaldaris denounced such statements, which caused the outrage of the Liberals. However, these statements alarmed the Venizelist camp, which launched an abortive coup in March 1935. After the successful suppression of the revolt, Tsaldaris dissolved the Parliament and proclaimed early elections, asking for the election of a Constitutional Assembly.

In one of the noteworthy acts of his second premiership, Tsaldaris signed a quadripartite pact with Turkey, Romania and Yugoslavia as well as a separate agreement with Turkey, guaranteeing the common borders of the two countries.

== Last years (1935–1936) ==
The parties of the Opposition, including the Liberal Party, did not participate in the elections of 1935, protesting the electoral law, passed by Tsaldaris' government, and for the special courts, which had already, sentenced to death two prominent Liberal army officers, the Generals Anastasios Papoulas and Miltiadis Koimisis. As a result, the People's Party won a landslide victory. Tsaldaris and his allies won all but six seats in parliament.

By nearly all accounts, the 1935 elections all but assured the restoration of the monarchy. Tsaldaris himself strongly favoured the return of George II, but he wanted to ensure legitimacy by conducting a plebiscite first. However, several right-wing elements, including a significant faction of Tsaldaris' own party, demanded the return the monarchy without the formality of a referendum. During the electoral campaign, the Union of Royalists, an ephemeral alliance formed by Ioannis Metaxas, Ioannis Rallis and Georgios Stratos, had already expressly demanded the immediate return of the former King.

In the National Assembly, Tsaldaris insisted on a referendum. This angered those who wanted to dispense with such formalities, most importantly his own War Minister, Georgios Kondylis, a former Venizelist.

On October 10, 1935, Kondylis and the commanders of the Armed Forces (Alexandros Papagos was among them) called on Tsaldaris and demanded his resignation. With no other choice, Tsaldaris complied. Kondylis took over the premiership, and later that day forced President Alexandros Zaimis to resign. Kondylis abolished the republic, declared himself Regent and staged a plebiscite on November 11 for the return of the monarchy. Official results showed 98 percent of the voters supported the restoration of the monarchy—an implausibly high total that could have only been obtained through fraud.

After these dramatic events, the People's Party split and Ioannis Theotokis formed the National People's Party. In the elections of 1935 the People's Party and the Liberal Party had been almost evenly matched. During the post-election era, Tsaldaris participated with passion in the Parliament and held some of the best and most important speeches of his political career. Nevertheless, his bad health betrayed him and he did not manage to fulfill his political dreams.

He died in Athens on 17 May 1936. Before his death, he had voted against the first government of Ioannis Metaxas, the forerunner of the following dictatorship.

== Legacy ==
Panagis Tsaldaris was revered for his moderation as a royalist and right-wing politician. It is characteristic, that, when Kondylis, Papagos and other royalists of his parataxis demanded the immediate enforcement of the constitutional monarchy, Tsaldaris opposed these plans, asking for the conducting of a referendum. When he saw the burden of political instability, Tsaldaris preferred to step down instead of exacerbating the turmoil. At the same time, he remained firm to his democratic values.

After all, this was his main problem and his political torture: the balance between his democratic principles and his royalist affiliations. Tsaldaris had once said: "I was always anti-Venizelist and royalist but, at the same time, I always remained lawful (Nea online)", a combination difficult to be achieved, as the dramatic events of 1935 proved. And, although Tsaldaris portrayed himself as anti-Venizelist, the truth is that he had some common traits with Venizelos: They were both anti-popularist and anti-extremist. The problem was that Tsaldaris lacked Venizelos' charisma and the popular appeal of his main political opponent. Venizelos marked a whole era and provoked intense passions; Tsaldaris' passing through history was much more quiet.

Certainly, Tsaldaris may be accused for one thing: During the last years of his political career, he did not foresee Metaxas' dictatorship and he did not react in order to prevent the advent of the dictatorial regime. But this was a failing he shared with most other politicians of his time.

== See also ==
- Konstantinos Tsaldaris

Political offices
Preceded by Eleftherios Venizelos	Prime Minister of Greece; November 3, 1932 – January 16, 1933	Succeeded by Eleftherios Venizelos
Preceded by Alexandros Othonaios	Prime Minister of Greece; March 10, 1933 – October 10, 1935	Succeeded by Georgios Kondylis
