= Liberalism in Greece =

This article gives an overview of liberalism in Greece. Liberal parties in Greece are largely committed to liberalism, republicanism and democracy. It is limited to liberal parties.

Since 2015, classical liberalism has seen a surge in popularity. Surveys conducted in 2019 and 2023 found that approximately 20% of the population self-identified as liberal.

== History ==
Each of the following sections describes an element of Greek liberalism, beginning with the 19th century.

=== From Modernist Party to the Center Union ===
- 1875: The Modernist Party (Neoteristikon Komma) is formed
- 1910: A resurrected Liberal Party (Komma Fileleftheron) is formed under Eleftherios Venizelos
- 1935: Faction around Georgios Papandreou forms the Democratic Socialist Party of Greece
- 1936: All political parties are banned in Greece under Ioannis Metaxas' dictatorship, but a liberal movement remained present
- 1941: The Greek government in exile contains mostly liberal politicians
- 1946: Start of the Greek Civil War, lasting until 1949
- 1946: Liberal fraction led by Themistoklis Sophoulis continues under the Liberal Party name
- 1956: Liberal Party takes part in the elections of 1956 in the Liberal Democratic Union (Filelefthero Dimokratiko Kentro) coalition
- 1961: Liberal Party merges into the Centre Union

=== From Democratic Socialist Party to the Center Union ===
- 1935: A faction of the Liberal Party around Georgios Papandreou forms the Democratic Socialist Party of Greece
- 1936: All political parties are banned in Greece under Ioannis Metaxas' dictatorship, but a liberal movement remained present
- 1941: The Greek government in exile contains mostly liberal politicians
- 1946: Start of the Greek Civil War, lasting until 1949
- 1946: Liberal faction led by Georgios Papandreou is part of the National Political Union alliance
- 1949: National Progressive Union of the Centre (Ethniki Proodeutiki Enosis Kentrou, EPEK) is founded by Nikolaos Plastiras after the Greek Civil War and disappears in 1956. The remains of the party merged into Center Union.
- 1956: Liberal faction led by Georgios Papandreou is part of the Liberal Democratic Union coalition

=== From Center Union to Union of the Democratic Center ===
- 1961: Georgios Papandreou forms the Centre Union (Enosi Kentrou)
- 1965: Right-wing faction of the Center Union forms the short-lived Liberal Democratic Center
- 1967: Start of the Military Junta continuing until 1974
- 1974: Centre Union - New Forces (Enosi Kentrou-Nees Dynameis) is formed by George Mavros
- 1974: Ioannis Zigdis forms the Democratic Center Union which merges into the Union of the Democratic Centre in 1976
- 1976: Union of the Democratic Centre is formed as successor of the Centre Union - New Forces
- 1981: Nikitas Venizelos splits from Union of the Democratic Centre and revives the Liberal Party of his grandfather, which has participated in elections since.
- 2012: The Liberal Party vanished.

=== Party of New Liberals ===
- 1977: Constantine Mitsotakis forms the Party of New Liberals which merges into New Democracy in 1978

=== Union of Centrists ===
- 1990: Centre (Κέντρο) is founded by George G. Papandreou, son of Georgios Papandreou.
- 1992: Union of Centrists (Enosi Kentroon) is founded by Vassilis Leventis and by Centre.

=== The Liberals and Drassi ===
- 1999: A short-lived libertarian party is founded by Stefanos Manos, The Liberals espousing a laissez-faire political platform, such as social liberal policies. The party was dissolved in October 2001. The party's founder cooperated with PASOK in 2004, after George Papandreou's invitation to be honorarily elected as member of the Greek parliament under PASOK's flag, and founded yet another party, "Drassi", in 2009, this time refusing to use the term "liberal" and claiming it was based upon "common sense".

=== Liberal Alliance ===
- February 2007: Establishment of the Liberal Alliance, advocating economic and social liberal policies.

=== Recreate Greece ===
- December 2011: A new classical liberal party emerged after the Greek government-debt crisis. The party aimed to establish a flat tax system and to limit the state. In May 2012 the electoral coalition of Recreate Greece, Drassi and the Liberal Alliance was announced.

== Liberal leaders ==
- Liberal Party: Eleftherios Venizelos - Themistoklis Sophoulis - Sophoklis Venizelos
- National Progressive Union of the centre: Nikolaos Plastiras
- Centre Union: Georgios Papandreou - George Mavros
- Union of the Democratic Center: George Mavros - Ioannis Zigdis
- Party of New Liberals: Constantine Mitsotakis

== See also ==
- History of Greece
- Politics of Greece
- List of political parties in Greece
- Venizelism
