= Left Liberals (Greece) =

Left Liberals Αριστερoί Φιλελεύθεροι Aristeroi Fileleftheroi
- Leader: Neokosmos Grigoriadis, Stamatis Ηatzibeis
- Founded: 1944
- Dissolved: 1951
- Merged into: United Democratic Left
- Ideology: Socialism; Liberalism
- Political position: Left-wing

The Left Liberals (Greek: Κόμμα Αριστερών Φιλελευθέρων, Αριστερoί Φιλελεύθεροι) was a Greek left-wing political party.

It was founded in 1944 by Neokosmos Grigoriadis and Stamatis Hatzibeis, former members of the Liberal Party who participated in the political coalition of EAM.

In the Greek legislative election of 1950, the party formed the Democratic Alignment, a coalition with the Socialist Party of Greece. In August 1951 the party merged with other small left-wing parties into United Democratic Left.
