= Dimitrios Kiousopoulos =

Greek jurist and politician

- Δημήτριος Κιουσόπουλος

Prime Minister of Greece
- In office 11 October 1952 – 19 November 1952
- Monarch: Paul
- Preceded by: Nikolaos Plastiras
- Succeeded by: Alexandros Papagos

Personal details
- Born: 17 November 1892 Andritsaina, Elis, Peloponnese, Greece
- Died: 20 January 1977 (aged 84) Athens, Greece
- Party: Independent

Dimitrios Kiousopoulos (Greek: Δημήτριος Κιουσόπουλος, November 17, 1892 – January 20, 1977) was an important Greek jurist, politician, and the caretaker Prime Minister of Greece in 1952. He was born on November 17, 1892, in the town of Andritsaina, Elis, Peloponnese.

He began a successful legal career in 1917. Following World War II, he was a public prosecutor heavily involved in the expulsion of Chams (Muslims of Albanian descent, many of whom had been enthusiastic collaborators with occupying Axis powers) from northern Greece, sentencing 178 to death, 370 to life imprisonment, and about 1,950 to death in absentia. He became Prosecutor for the Supreme Court (Areios Pagos) from 1950 to 1961. When Nikolaos Plastiras was voted out of office, Kiousopoulos became the caretaker prime minister of Greece for 39 days, from 11 October to 19 November 1952 when General Alexandros Papagos and the Greek Rally party won a major victory. He is one of 17 people to serve less than 40 days as prime minister, and the only one to do so in the 1950s. Kiousopoulos died on 20 January 1977 in Athens.

Political offices
Preceded by Nikolaos Plastiras	Prime Minister of Greece (caretaker); 11 October – 19 November 1952	Succeeded by Alexandros Papagos
