= National Political Union (1946) =

National Political Union Εθνική Πολιτική Ένωσις
- Leader: Sofoklis Venizelos
- Founded: 1946
- Dissolved: 1950
- Ideology: Liberalism (Greek); Venizelism; Centrism; Republicanism
- Political position: Centre-left

The National Political Union (Greek: Εθνική Πολιτική Ένωσις (ΕΠΕ), Ethniki Politiki Enosis (EPE)) was a political alliance in Greece in the 1940s.

== History ==
The coalition was founded in 1946 as an alliance of the National Unionist Party, the Democratic Socialist Party of Greece and the Liberal Party of Venizelists. In the general elections that year, the alliance received 19% of the vote, winning 68 seats.

The alliance did not contest any further elections.

== See also ==
- National Political Union (1984)
