= Savas Papapolitis =

Greek politician

Savas Papapolitis (Greek: Σάββας Παπαπολίτης, 1911 in Makri – October 7, 1973 in Athens) was a Greek politician.

At the age of 40, he was the youngest leader of a major political party in the modern history of the Hellenic Republic. He was a member of the Greek Parliament, Minister of Trade, Minister of Industry, Leader of the political party National Progressive Center Union (EPEK) from 1953 following the death of Nikolaos Plastiras, and co-founder of the Center Union party. He was instrumental in Greece's accession to NATO. As a Minister of Trade, Papapolitis played a major role in the restructure of the Greek economy in 1952.
