= Parataxis (disambiguation) =

Parataxis is a literary technique, in writing or speaking, that favors short, simple phrases, often without the use of conjunctions.

Parataxis or paratactic may also refer to:

- Parataxis (politics), a term used in Greek politics
- Paratactic lines, equidistant lines in elliptic geometry
- Parataxis (military formation), devised by Alexios I Komnenos

== See also ==
- Parataxic distortion
