= United Alignment of Nationalists =

United Alignment of Nationalists Ηνωμένη Παράταξις Εθνικοφρόνων
- Leader: Konstantinos Tsaldaris
- Founded: 1946
- Dissolved: 1950
- Ideology: National conservatism Nationalism; Royalism; Anti-communism
- Political position: Right-wing

The United Alignment of Nationalists (Greek: Ηνωμένη Παράταξις Εθνικοφρόνων) was a right-wing political alliance in Greece formed to contest the 1946 elections. It consisted of the People's Party, the National Liberal Party, the Reformist Party, the Royalist Party, the Panhellenic National Party, the Patriotic Union Party the Forward Political Group, the Party of Reconstruction and the Social Radical Union.

The alliance received 55% of the vote, winning 206 of the 354 seats in the Hellenic Parliament.
