= Progressive Liberal Party (Greece) =

The Progressive Liberal Party (Greek: Κόμμα Προοδευτικών Φιλελευθέρων, Komma Proodeftikon Fileleftheron) was a short-lived political party founded by General Nikolaos Plastiras in December 1949. The party belonged to the political center, supporting liberalism as it had been shaped in Greece by Eleftherios Venizelos (Venizelism).

In the run-up to the March 1950 elections, it formed a coalition with Emmanouil Tsouderos' Democratic Progressive Party, also a centrist liberal party, under the name National Progressive Center Union (EPEK).

With the transformation of the electoral alliance into a permanent political formation in April 1950, the Progressive Liberal Party merged into it.

== History ==
With the end of the Greek Civil War, General Plastiras decided to enter the political arena. He sought an oral agreement in principle with Sofoklis Venizelos, leader of the Liberal Party at the time, to take over the leadership of the party. Sofoklis Venizelos, however, refused and on 3 December 1949, Plastiras applied to the Parliament for the creation of a new party called the "Progressive Liberal Party".

The new party chose to bear the same title as the party of Georgios Kafantaris of 1924, since on the one hand this way (addition of an epithet) named the splits of the Liberal party and on the other hand it appeared as a direct successor of Kafantaris' party.

The objectives of the party were:

- reconstruction of the country (better use of American aid)
- national reconciliation, with equal rights for all citizens regardless of their political views
- tackling corruption
- restoration of friendly relations with neighbouring (socialist) countries

The party served for Plastiras to enter the political scene in order to form a broader alliance around him. Indeed, immediately after its foundation, contacts with the other parties of the centre began. As a result of the talks, on 13 January 1950, announced the electoral alliance between the Progressive Liberal Party and the Democratic Progressive Party under the name of National Progressive Center Union and the leadership of Plastiras.
