= Politically Independent Alignment =

Politically Independent Alignment Πολιτική Ανεξάρτητος Παράταξις
- President: Konstantinos Maniadakis
- Founded: 1949/50
- Dissolved: 1951
- Merged into: Greek Rally
- Ideology: Metaxism; Greek nationalism Anti-communism; Personalism
- Political position: Far-right
- International affiliation: None

The Politically Independent Alignment, alternatively translated as Politically Independent Camp or Front (Greek: Πολιτική Ανεξάρτητη Παράταξη or Πολιτική Ανεξάρτητος Παράταξις, Politikí Anexártiti Parátaxi or Politikí Anexártitos Parátaxis, PAP) was a Greek electoral alliance that ran in the 1950 legislative election and represented loyalists of the former dictator Ioannis Metaxas.

It was established in 1949 as an alliance of the Greek Renaissance Party of Konstantinos Maniadakis, former Minister of Public Order during the 4th of August Regime, and the Nationalist Party of Theodoros Tourkovasilis, a former Governor of the Bank of Greece.

In the 1950 Greek legislative election, the party gained 8,15% of the votes and 16 seats in the Hellenic Parliament.

== Electoral history ==
Election date	Party leader	Number of votes received	Percentage of votes	Number of seats
1950	Konstantinos Maniadakis	137,618	8.1%	16 / 250
