= 1951 Greek parliamentary election =

- 9 September 1951

All 258 seats in the Hellenic Parliament 130 seats needed for a majority
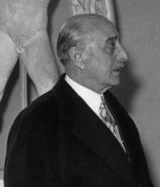

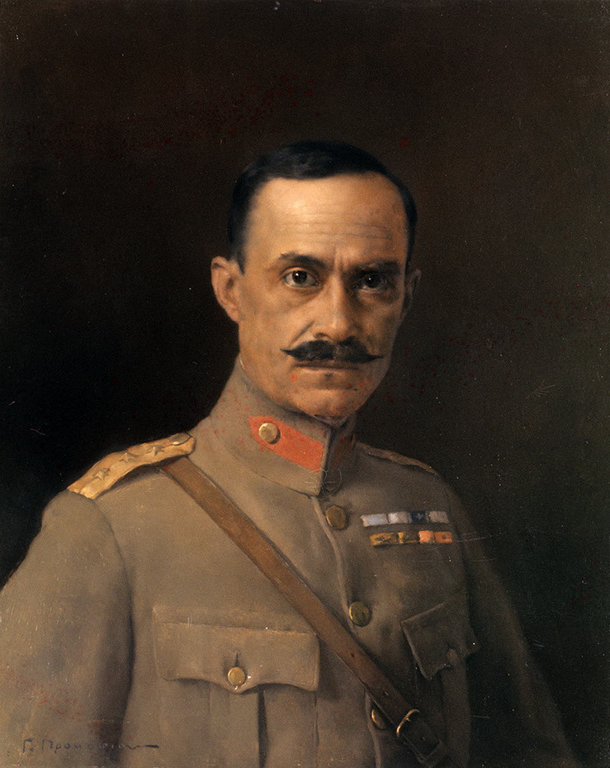

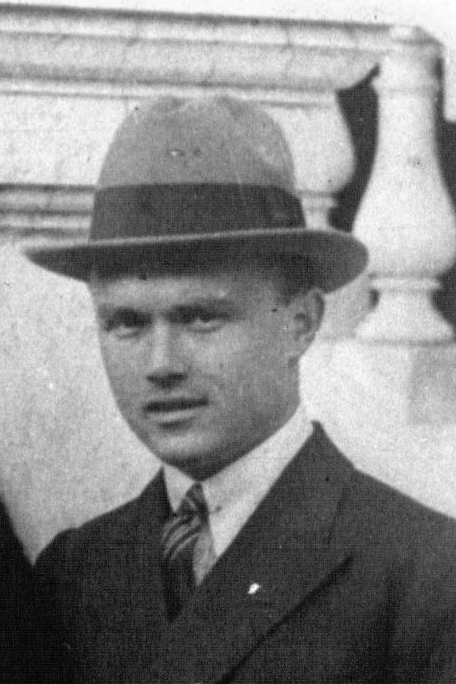

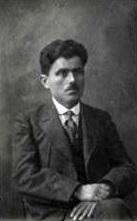

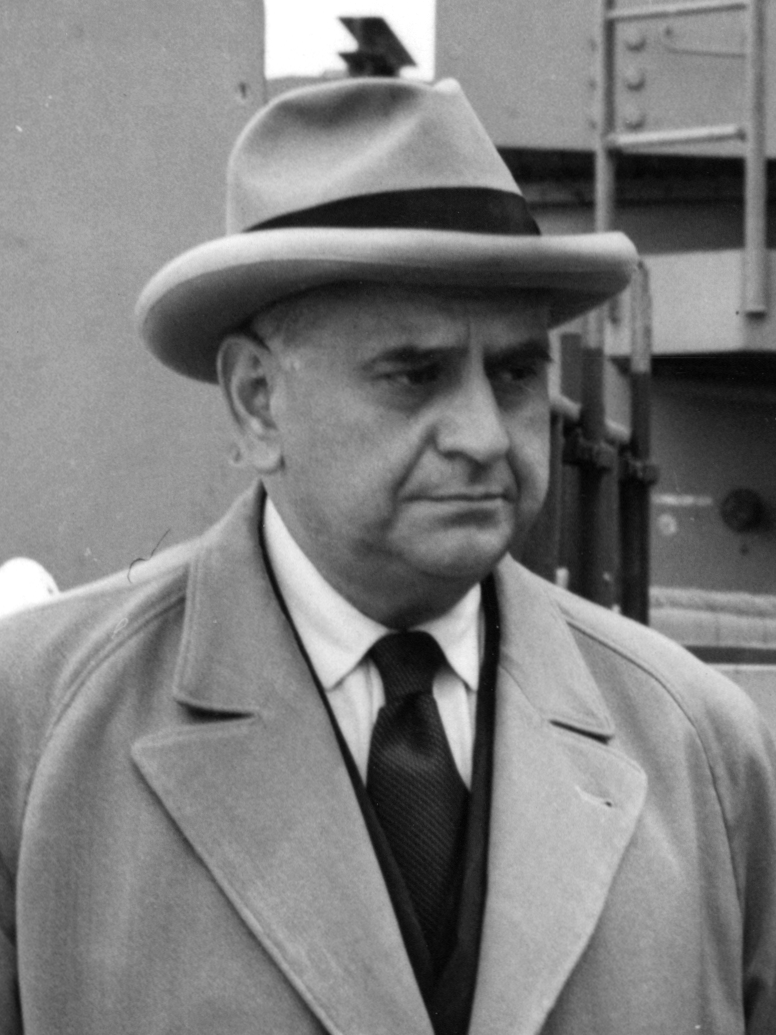
	First party	Second party	Third party
Leader	Alexandros Papagos	Nikolaos Plastiras	Sofoklis Venizelos
Party	Greek Rally	EPEK	Liberal
Last election	–	16.45%, 45 seats	17.24%, 56 seats
Seats won	114	74	57
Seat change	New	▲29	▲1
Popular vote	624,316	401,379	325,390
Percentage	36.53%	23.49%	19.04%
Swing	New	▲7.04pp	▲1.80pp
	Fourth party	Fifth party	Sixth party
Leader	Ioannis Passalidis	Konstantinos Tsaldaris	Alexandros Baltatzis
Party	EDA	People's	AEK
Last election	–	18.79%, 62 seats	–
Seats won	10	2	1
Seat change	New	▼60	New
Popular vote	180,640	113,876	21,009
Percentage	10.57%	6.66%	1.23%
Swing	New	▼12.13pp	New
- Results by constituency
Prime Minister before election
Sofoklis Venizelos
Liberal
Prime Minister after election
Nikolaos Plastiras
EPEK

Parliamentary elections were held in Greece on 9 September 1951. They resulted in an ambivalent outcome, consisting a narrow and pyrrhic, as proven later, victory for the ruling center-liberal parties of Sophoklis Venizelos and Nikolaos Plastiras.

== Background ==
After the Greek elections of 1950, when the divided centrist parties had a clear majority in the Parliament political instability was the main characteristic of the political life in Greece. The subsequent centre-liberal governments of Sophoklis Venizelos, Nikolaos Plastiras and Georgios Papandreou did not manage to ensure and enforce stability. As a result, Nikolaos Plastiras supported a People's Party government, under the terms that the latter would soon conduct elections.

== Outcome ==
First party in the elections of 1951 was the just-founded Greek Rally of Alexandros Papagos, which swept the traditionally dominant right-wing People's Party. Nevertheless, the two major centrist-liberal parties, the Liberal Party and the National Progressive Center Union, elected more deputies than the conservatives.

The left-wing EDA, a party believed to have been affiliated with the outlaw during 1950-1974 Communist Party of Greece, made its first appearance in these elections.

== Results ==
Party	Votes	%	Seats	+/–
Greek Rally	624,316	36.53	114	New
National Progressive Center Union	401,379	23.49	74	+29
Liberal Party	325,390	19.04	57	+1
United Democratic Left	180,640	10.57	10	–8
People's Party	113,876	6.66	2	–60
Georgios Papandreou Party	35,810	2.10	0	–35
Agricultural and Labour Party	21,009	1.23	1	New
Socialist Party of Greece	3,912	0.23	0	New
List of Independents	1,554	0.09	0	0
Communist Archio-Marxist Party	53	0.00	0	New
Independents	965	0.06	0	0
Total	1,708,904	100.00	258	+8
Valid votes	1,708,904	99.53		
Invalid/blank votes	8,108	0.47		
Total votes	1,717,012	100.00		
Registered voters/turnout	2,224,246	77.20		
Source: Nohlen & Stöver, Hellenic Parliament

== Aftermath ==
Since no party or alliance had the absolute majority in the Parliament and Alexandros Papagos refused to participate in a government of national unity, the Liberal Party and the National Progressive Center Union formed a minority government under the leadership of Nikolaos Plastiras, which lasted for about a year, since 1952, when Nikolaos Plastiras submitted his resignation and new parliamentary elections were proclaimed by the King Paul I.
