= Democratic Alignment =

Democratic Alignment may refer to:

- Democratic Alignment (1950), a political party alliance in Greece
- Democratic Alignment (2015), a political party alliance in Greece
- Democratic Alignment (Cyprus), a political party in Cyprus
