= Agrapidies =

Village in Western Macedonia, Greece

Agrapidies Αγραπιδιές
- Community
- Location within Greece
- Coordinates: 40°38′47″N 21°32′02″E
- Country: Greece
- Administrative region: Western Macedonia
- Regional unit: Florina
- Municipality: Amyntaio
- Municipal unit: Aetos

Population (2021)
  - Community: 58
- Time zone: UTC+2 (EET)
  - Summer (DST): UTC+3 (EEST)

Agrapidies (Greek: Αγραπιδιές, before 1926: Γκόρισκον – Gkoriskon; Turkish: Goriçka) is a village in the Florina regional unit of Western Macedonia, Greece.

The new modern Greek name of the village Agrapidies is a plant based toponym derived from local flora present in the wider region.

In the late 15th century, the village was recorded in an Ottoman document as a timar holding with 31 families. In statistics gathered by Vasil Kanchov in 1900, Gkorisko was populated by 100 Turks and 35 Romani. The village was Muslim and had 150 inhabitants in 1912. The 1920 Greek census recorded 162 people in the village, and 155 inhabitants (21 families) were Muslim in 1923.

Following the Greek–Turkish population exchange, Greek refugee families in Gkorisko were from East Thrace (4), Pontus (13) and the Caucasus (1) in 1926. The 1928 Greek census recorded 102 village inhabitants. In 1928, the refugee families numbered 19 (82 people). The demographics of the village were not impacted by the Greek Civil War.

== Notable people ==
- Dimosthenis Theocharidis - politician
