= Democratic Socialist Party of Greece =

Democratic Socialist Party of Greece Δημοκρατικό Σοσιαλιστικό Κόμμα
- Founder: Georgios Papandreou
- Founded: June 1945
- Dissolved: 1950
- Ideology: Democratic socialism Liberalism; Venizelism
- Political position: Left-wing

The Democratic Socialist Party of Greece (Greek: Δημοκρατικό Σοσιαλιστικό Κόμμα Ελλάδος Demokratiko Sosialistiko Komma Ellados) was a political party founded by George Papandreou. The party came about as a continuation of the Democratic Party which he had founded in 1935 and which ceased to exist the following year due to the declaration of Metaxas' dictatorship (4th of August Regime). Participated in the 1946 elections as part of the coalition of the National Political Union (1946) and won 27 seats out of 68 in the coalition.

Since the 1950 legislative elections and for the next two elections (1951, 1952) the party appears in the press and on ballot papers under the name of Georgios Papandreou in order not to cause misinterpretations by using the term "socialist". However, the official title (as stated in the parliamentary minutes) remains the same.
