= Union of Agrarian Parties =

The Union of Agrarian Parties (Greek: Ένωσις Αγροτικών Κομμάτων) was a list that contested elections in Greece between 1946 and 1974.

== History ==
The Union first contested national elections in 1946, when it won a single seat in the Hellenic Parliament with 0.7% of the vote.

The party did not contest any further elections.
