= List of Independents =

Electoral list in Greece

The List of Independents (Greek: Συνδυασμοί ανεξάρτητων υποψηφίων) was a list that contested elections in Greece between 1946 and 1974.

== History ==
The list contested the 1946 elections, the first after World War II. It received 1% of the vote and won two seats. The 1950 elections saw the list lose both seats as its vote share fell to 0.2%. The list remained seatless after the 1951 elections, but won two seats in 1952 when it received 3.6% of the vote. It retained its two seats in 1956.

The 1958 elections saw the list lose its representation in the Hellenic Parliament, and it remained seatless after elections in 1961, 1963, 1964, 1974, after which it ceased to contest elections.

== Electoral history ==
=== Hellenic Parliament ===
Election date	Number of votes	Percentage of votes	Number of seats won
1946	12,036	1.08%	2 / 354
1950	2,979	0.2%	0 / 250
1951	1,554	0.1%	0 / 258
1952	56,679	3.6%	2 / 300
1956	31,002	0.9%	2 / 300
1958	4,009	0.1	0 / 300
1961	41,550	0.9	0 / 300
1963	22,093	0.5	0 / 300
1964	9,951	0.2	0 / 300
1974	42,291	0.9	0 / 300
