= Leonidas Papagos =

Greek general

Leonidas Papagos (Greek: Λεωνίδας Παπάγος) was a Greek general.

Born on the island of Syros in about 1844, he entered the Hellenic Army Academy, graduating in 1864 as an artillery officer. He later became an infantry officer, fought in the Greco-Turkish War of 1897, and served as chief of the personnel department of the Ministry of Military Affairs.

He retired with the rank of Major General on 18 July 1906 (O.S.). He married Maria Averoff, the niece of the magnate George Averoff, and had two sons, Nionios Papagos and the future Field Marshal and Prime Minister of Greece Alexandros Papagos.
