= 1946 Greek parliamentary election =

- 31 March 1946

All 354 seats in the Hellenic Parliament 178 seats needed for a majority
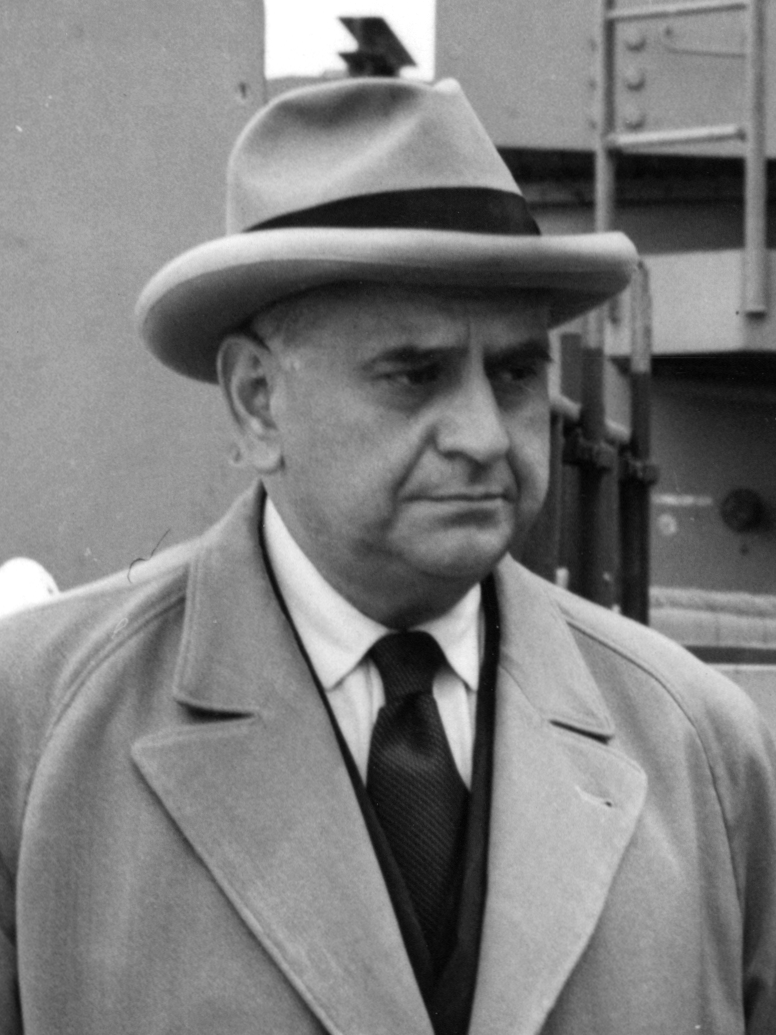

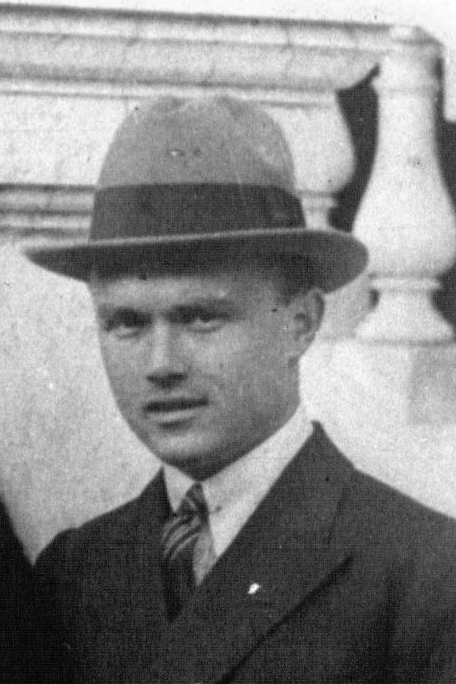

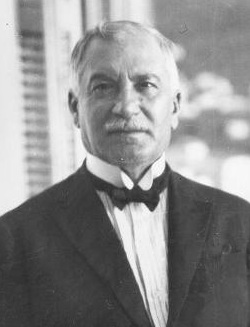

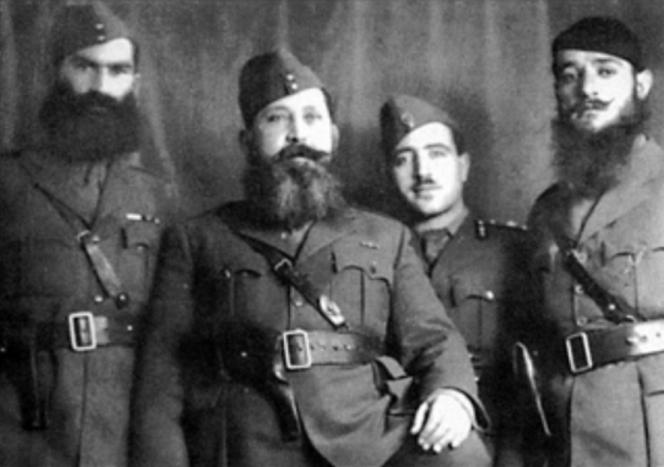
	First party	Second party
Leader	Konstantinos Tsaldaris	Sofoklis Venizelos
Party	NPE	EPE
Last election	22.10%, 72 seats	11 seats, 5.01%
Seats won	206	68
Seat change	▲134	▲57
Popular vote	610,995	213,721
Percentage	55.12%	19.28%
Swing	▲33.02 pp	▲14.27 pp
	Third party	Fourth party
Leader	Themistoklis Sofoulis	Napoleon Zervas
Party	Liberal	EKE
Last election	37.26%, 126 seats	–
Seats won	48	20
Seat change	▼78	New
Popular vote	159,525	66,027
Percentage	14.39%	5.96%
Swing	▼22.87 pp	New
Prime Minister before election
Themistoklis Sofoulis
Liberal
Prime Minister after election
Konstantinos Tsaldaris
People's Party

Parliamentary elections were held in Greece on 31 March 1946. The result was a victory for the United Alignment of Nationalists, an alliance that included the People's Party, the National Liberal Party, and the Reform Party, which won 206 of the 354 seats in Parliament. As a result, Konstantinos Tsaldaris became Prime Minister leading a right-wing coalition. Nonetheless, he soon decided to resign in favor of Themistoklis Sofoulis, who led a government of national unity (conservative and centre-liberal forces) during the entire second phase of the civil war (1946–1949). One of the priorities of the new government was the proclamation of a plebiscite for the restoration of the Greek monarchy.

The elections were marked by the boycott of the Communist Party of Greece claiming in protest against the unfolding, state-tolerated White Terror against the former members of EAM-ELAS. The night before the elections, a communist band attacked a police station in Litochoro. This event is considered the beginning of the three years civil war.

One of the reasons for the defeat of the centre-liberal parties was the division of the Liberal Party, founded by Eleftherios Venizelos. One faction remained loyal to the leadership of Themistoklis Sofoulis, while another faction followed Sofoklis Venizelos, who formed a coalition with Georgios Papandreou and Panagiotis Kanellopoulos.

The American, French and British governments sent election monitors to observe the election.

== Results ==
Party	Votes	%	Seats
United Alignment of Nationalists (Note: Included the People's Party (156 seats), the National Liberal Party (34), the Reform Party (5) and others (11))	610,995	55.12	206
National Political Union (Note: Included the Party of Venizelist Liberals (31 seats), the National Unionist Party (27), the Democratic Socialist Party (7) and others (3))	213,721	19.28	68
Liberal Party	159,525	14.39	48
National Party of Greece	66,027	5.96	20
Union of Nationalists	32,538	2.94	9
List of Independents	12,036	1.09	2
Union of Agrarian Parties	7,447	0.67	1
Party X	1,848	0.17	0
Civil and Agricultural Party	1,114	0.10	0
Parataxis of Orthodox Christian Greeks	298	0.03	0
Patriotic Party of Reservists	63	0.01	0
Party for the National Union	15	0.00	0
Socialist Party	13	0.00	0
Independents	2,833	0.26	0
Total	1,108,473	100.00	354
Valid votes	1,108,473	98.82	
Invalid/blank votes	13,223	1.18	
Total votes	1,121,696	100.00	
Source: Nohlen & Stöver, Global Elections Database
