= Union of Nationalists =

The Union of Nationalists (Greek: Ένωσις Εθνικοφρόνων), also known as the Union of Nationally Minded, was a political alliance in Greece in the 1940s.

== History ==
The alliance was formed prior to the 1946 elections by an alliance of the Nationalist Party and the People's Agrarian Party. It received 2.9% of the vote, winning nine seats in the Hellenic Parliament.

The alliance did not contest any further elections.
