= National Reconstruction Front (Greece) =

National Reconstruction Front Μέτωπο Εθνικής Αναδημιουργίας
- Leader: Panagiotis Kanellopoulos
- Founded: 1950
- Dissolved: 1951
- Preceded by: National Unionist Party
- Merged into: Greek Rally
- Ideology: Liberalism; Liberal conservatism Economic liberalism
- Political position: Centre

National Reconstruction Front (Greek: Μέτωπο Εθνικής Αναδημιουργίας) was an economically liberal Greek political party founded in 1950 by Panagiotis Kanellopoulos as a continuation to his National Unionist Party.

In the 1950 Greek legislative election the party collaborated with Alexandros Sakellariou and other Centrist politicians. It gained 5,27% and elected 7 MPs.
