= Party of Farmers and Labourers =

The Party of Farmers and Labourers (Greek: Παράταξη Αγροτών και Εργαζομένων) was a political party in Greece in the 1950s.

== History ==
The party first contested national elections in 1950, when it won three seats in the Hellenic Parliament with 2.6% of the vote. However, it did not contest any further elections.
