= Democratic Alignment (1950) =

Democratic Alignment Δημοκρατική Παράταξη
- Leader: Alexandros Svolos
- Founded: 1950
- Dissolved: 1951
- Preceded by: All People Front
- Succeeded by: United Democratic Left
- Ideology: Socialism; Communism
- Political position: Left-wing

The Democratic Alignment (Greek: Δημοκρατική Παράταξη, ΔΠ; DP) was a coalition of left-wing parties in Greece in the 1950s. It was established in order to participate in the 1950 elections and was formed by the Socialist Party led by Alexandros Svolos and the Left Liberals led by Stamatis Hatzibeis. The coalition was also supported by the outlawed Communist Party.

In the elections the coalition received 9.7% of the vote and won 18 seats. Prior to the 1951 elections the coalition merged into United Democratic Left.
