= Parataxis (politics) =

Parataxis (Παράταξις) is a term used in the politics of Greece to refer to a political family or partisan camp grouped around a certain major idea.

This term is often used in the names of political coalitions and alliances, such as Parataxis Agroton kai Ergazomenon (Camp of Farmers and Workers, 1950 elections), Politiki Anexartitos Parataxis (Politically Independent Camp, 1950 elections), Parataxis Kentrou (Center Camp), Ethniki Parataxis (National Camp, formed in 1977, far right), Inomeni Parataxis Ethnikofronon ("United Camp of National-Thinkers", or "United Patriotic Party" conservative), Dimokratiki Parataxis (1950 elections).

Constantine Karamanlis, in his proclamation on the foundation of his party New Democracy and later preferred describe it as parataxis, to put a distance from his pre-coup party Ethniki Rizospastiki Enosis and to hint a broader participation.
