= 1952 Greek parliamentary election =

Greek politics

- 16 November 1952

All 300 seats in the Hellenic Parliament 151 seats needed for a majority
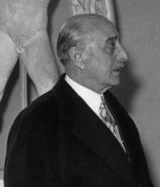

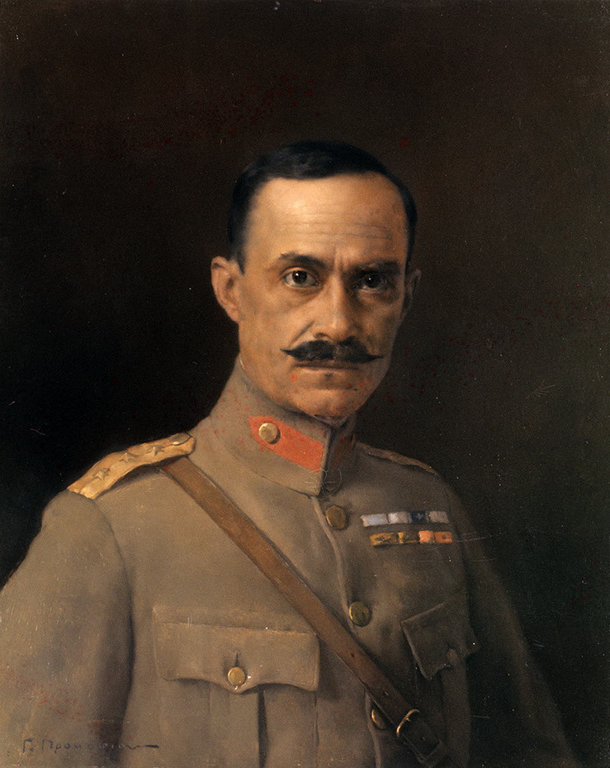
	First party	Second party
Leader	Alexandros Papagos	Nikolaos Plastiras
Party	Greek Rally	EPEK–KF
Last election	36.53%, 114 seats	42.53%, 131 seats
Seats won	247	51
Seat change	▲133	▼80
Popular vote	783,541	544,834
Percentage	49.22%	34.23%
Swing	▲12.69 pp	▼8.30 pp
Prime Minister before election
Nikolaos Plastiras
EPEK-KF
Prime Minister after election
Alexandros Papagos
ES

Parliamentary elections were held in Greece on 16 November 1952. They resulted in a victory for General Alexander Papagos and the party he had founded the previous year, the Greek Rally party. Papagos won by unifying most of the conservative forces under his leadership, and taking advantage of a weakened centre. The electorate of Konstantinos Tsaldaris' People's Party, the leading conservative party in the 1950 elections, shrank to only 1%.

== Results ==
Party	Votes	%	Seats	+/–
Greek Rally	783,541	49.22	247	+133
National Progressive Center Union–Liberal Party	544,834	34.23	51	–80
United Democratic Left	152,011	9.55	0	–10
People's Party	16,767	1.05	0	–2
Agricultural and Labour Party	10,431	0.66	0	–1
List of Independents	56,679	3.56	2	+2
Agricultural Party	691	0.04	0	New
Independents	26,853	1.69	0	0
Total	1,591,807	100.00	300	+42
Valid votes	1,591,807	99.48		
Invalid/blank votes	8,365	0.52		
Total votes	1,600,172	100.00		
Registered voters/turnout	2,123,150	75.37		
Source: Nohlen & Stöver
