= Nikolaos Plastiras =

Soldier and Prime Minister of Greece (1883–1953)

- Νικόλαος Πλαστήρας
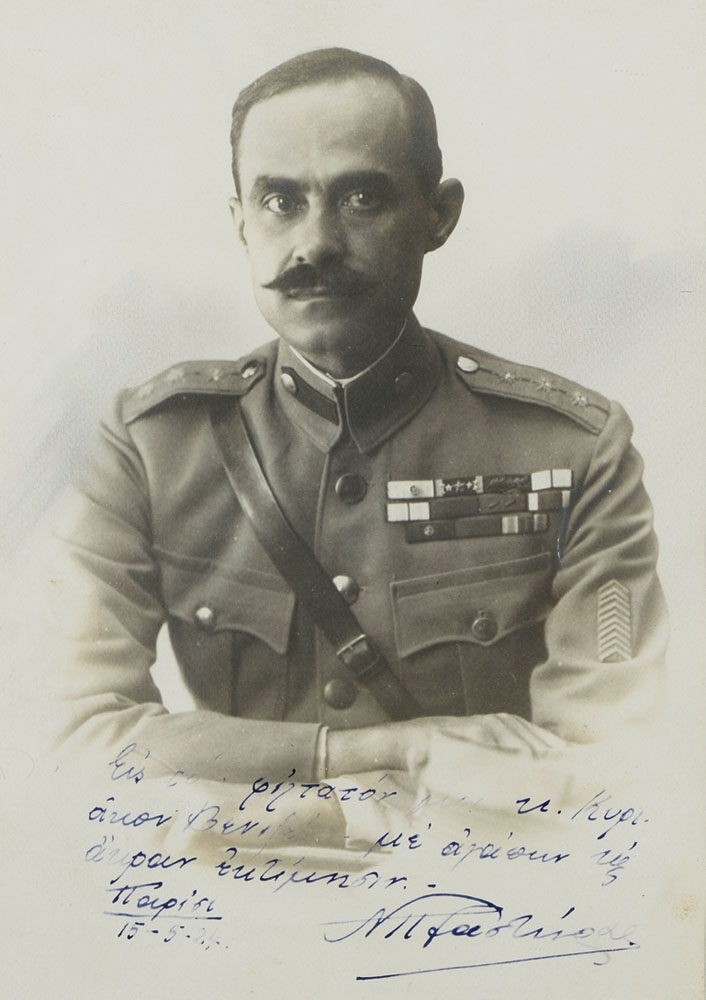
- Nikolaos Plastiras as a colonel, c. 1923

Prime Minister of Greece
- In office 1 November 1951 – 11 October 1952
- Monarch: Paul
- Preceded by: Sofoklis Venizelos
- Succeeded by: Dimitrios Kiousopoulos
- In office 15 April 1950 – 21 August 1950
- Monarch: Paul
- Preceded by: Sofoklis Venizelos
- Succeeded by: Sofoklis Venizelos
- In office 3 January 1945 – 9 April 1945
- Monarch: George II
- Regent: Archbishop Damaskinos
- Preceded by: Georgios Papandreou
- Succeeded by: Petros Voulgaris

Personal details
- Born: 4 November 1883 Karditsa, Kingdom of Greece
- Died: 26 July 1953 (aged 69) Athens, Kingdom of Greece
- Resting place: First Cemetery of Athens
- Party: National Progressive Center Union
- Profession: Soldier; Politician
- Nickname(s): Black Rider; Μαύρος Καβαλάρης; Black Pepper; Kara Biber

Military service
- Allegiance: Kingdom of Greece
- Branch/service: Hellenic Army
- Years of service: 1904–1924
- Rank: Lieutenant General
- Unit: Archipelago Division
- Commands: 5/42 Evzone Regiment
- Battles/wars: Macedonian Struggle; Goudi Coup; Balkan Wars; First Balkan War; Battle of Yenidje; Second Balkan War; Battle of Kilkis-Lachanas; World War I; Macedonian front; Battle of Skra-di-Legen; Russian Civil War; Allied intervention in the Russian Civil War; Southern Front; Southern Russia Intervention; Soviet invasion of Ukraine; Greco-Turkish War (1919-1922); Greek Summer Offensive; Battle of Aslıhanlar–Dumlupınar; Battle of the Sakarya; Greek Retreat; Battle of Dumlupınar; 11 September 1922 Revolution; 1935 Greek coup d'état attempt

Nikolaos Plastiras (Greek: Νικόλαος Πλαστήρας; 4 November 1883 – 26 July 1953) was a Greek general and politician, who served three times as Prime Minister of Greece. A distinguished soldier known for his personal bravery, he became famous as "The Black Rider" during the Greco-Turkish War of 1919–1922, where he commanded the 5/42 Evzone Regiment. Due to his fame, he retained his position despite the military reshuffle that commenced after the 1920 elections. After the Greek defeat in the war, along with other Venizelist officers he launched the 11 September 1922 Revolution that deposed King Constantine I of Greece and his government. The military-led government ruled until January 1924, when power was handed over to an elected National Assembly, which later declared the Second Hellenic Republic. In the interwar period, Plastiras remained a devoted Venizelist and republican. Trying to avert the rise of the royalist People's Party and the restoration of the monarchy, he led two coup attempts in 1933 and 1935, both of which failed, hastening the collapse of the Second Republic and forcing Plastiras to exile in France.

During the Axis Occupation of Greece in the Second World War he was the nominal leader of the EDES resistance group, although he remained in exile in Marseille. His stance and opinions on the occupation remain a matter of scholarly debate. After the occupation, he returned to Greece, founding the National Progressive Centre Union (EPEK) and serving as a centrist Prime Minister three times, often in coalition with the Liberal Party. In his last two governments, he tried to heal the rift caused in Greek society by the Greek Civil War, but was unsuccessful. He championed land resettlement and wealth redistribution policies, along with the extension of voting rights to women, the release of political prisoners and abolition of the death penalty, despite his own anti-communist beliefs. The EPEK-Liberal coalition's defeat in the 1952 elections to Greek Rally began a three-decade dominance of the political right in Greek politics. Plastiras died in poverty in July 1953 and was accorded a state funeral.

== Early life ==
He was born in 1883, in Karditsa, Greece. Plastiras's parents were originally from Morfovouni (formerly Vounesi), a village in the Agrafa mountains of southwestern Thessaly. The municipality was renamed for General Plastiras and Morfovouni is the present capital of Plastiras Municipality. The family moved to Karditsa before Plastiras was born.

== Military career ==
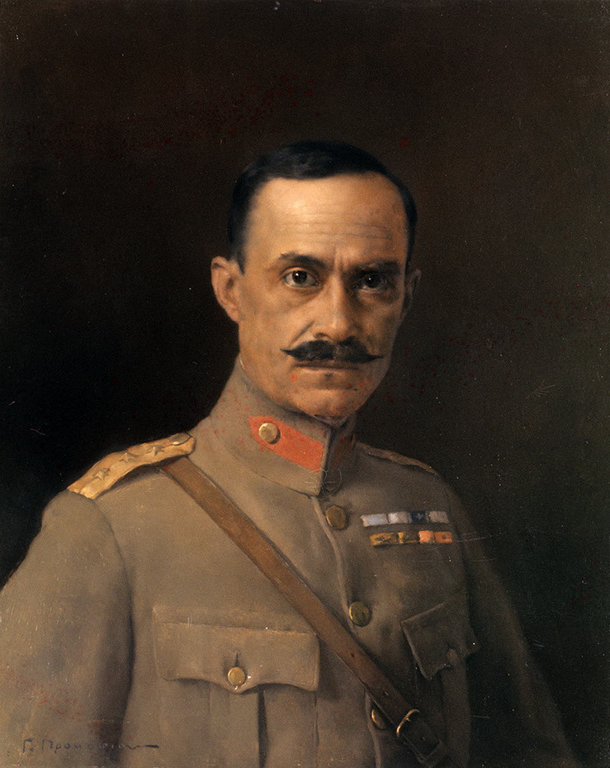
Nikolaos Plastiras as colonel, painting by Georgios Prokopiou (1921)

After finishing school in Karditsa, he joined the 5th Infantry Regiment as a volunteer in 1904. He fought in the Macedonian Struggle, and participated in the military coup of 1909. He entered the NCO School in 1910 and, after being assigned to the rank 2nd lieutenant in 1912, he fought with distinction in the Balkan Wars, where he earned his nickname "The Black Rider". He first rose to wider prominence when, as a major, he supported the Movement of National Defence of Eleftherios Venizelos during the First World War. He fought with distinction with the Archipelago Division at the battle of Skra-di-Legen and was promoted to lieutenant colonel. In 1919, Plastiras commanded the 5/42 Evzone Regiment in Ukraine, as part of an Allied force aiding the White Army in their ultimately unsuccessful fight against the Red Army. His force was then transferred to Smyrna in Asia Minor via Romania. After the change in power in Greece (November 1920) and the return of king Constantine, he was the only officer, who had participated in the National Defence movement, who was not dismissed from the army. The men of his Regiment warned that they wouldn't fight under another commander.

During the Greco-Turkish War of 1919–1922, the Turks called Plastiras Kara Biber ("The Black Pepper"), while the 5/42 Regiment of Evzones became known as the Şeytanın Askerleri ("Satan's Army"). Soon after, at the battle of Sakarya, the Greeks were forced to begin their retreat.

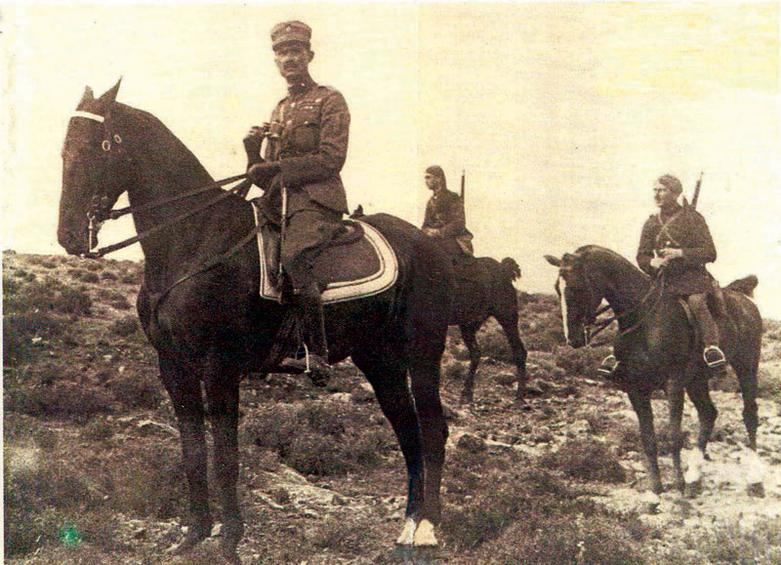
Nikolaos Plastiras on horseback with two Evzones, Asia Minor, 1922

After the Turkish breakthrough in August 1922, his unit have been ordered to counterattack at Kamelar mountain to regain Greek's positions. He didn't try on 13 August, but he did try and failed the following day. For this failure he was accused to be responsible for the 4th Greek Infantry Division destruction, supposed to get accusations on a court marshal. His unit, 5/42 Evzones Regiment, was among others withdrawing orderly to the coast, fighting off superior Turkish forces and having serious casualties. The remnants of the Hellenic Army made their way to the islands of the Eastern Aegean.

=== September 1922 Revolution ===
The Army's resentment at the political leadership in Athens resulted in the outbreak of the 11 September 1922 Revolution, led by Plastiras, Colonel Stylianos Gonatas and Commander Phokas.

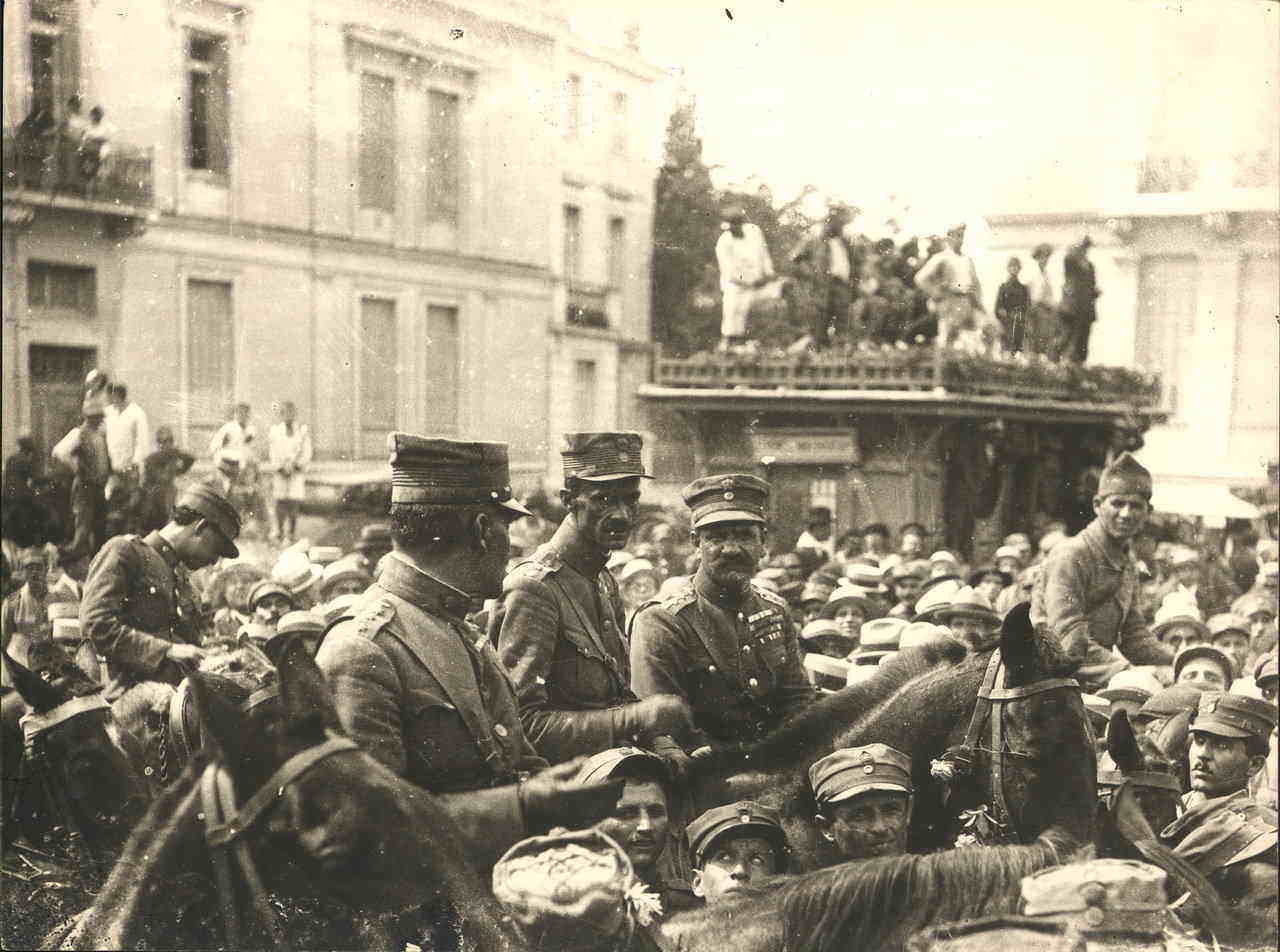
In Athens after the 1922 revolution

Having the support of the Army and much of the people, the revolutionary officers quickly entered Athens and assumed control of the country. He is reported by Penelope Delta, witness of the events, to have said to the crowd: "Why do you cheer? We lost, we came destroyed".

Plastiras forced King Constantine I to abdicate, called upon the exiled Venizelos to lead the negotiations with Turkey which culminated in the Treaty of Lausanne, and set about to reorganize the Army of Thrace against any Turkish advance (eastern Thrace was still in Greek hands). One of the most controversial acts of the revolutionary government was the trial and execution of five royalist politicians, including former PM Dimitrios Gounaris, and the former Commander-in-Chief, General Georgios Hatzianestis, on 28 November 1922 as those mainly responsible for the Asia Minor Disaster, in the infamous "Trial of the Six".

Plastiras faced multiple challenges in governing Greece. The 1.3 million refugees from the population exchange had to be catered for in a country with a ruined economy, internationally isolated and internally divided. The Corfu incident, and a botched Royalist coup in October 1923 were evidence of this. After the failed royalist coup, King George II was forced to leave the country. Nonetheless, he managed to restore some order to the state and to lay the groundwork for the Second Hellenic Republic. After the elections of December 1923 for the new National Assembly, he resigned from the army on 2 January 1924, retiring to private life. In recognition of his services to the country, the National Assembly declared him "worthy of the fatherland" and conferred to him the rank of lieutenant general in retirement.

Plastiras was even admired by his greatest enemy, Mustafa Kemal. At the end of the war, during the negotiations that took place regarding the exchange of populations between Greece and the newly formed Republic of Turkey, Atatürk is quoted telling Plastiras, "I gave gold and you gave me copper."

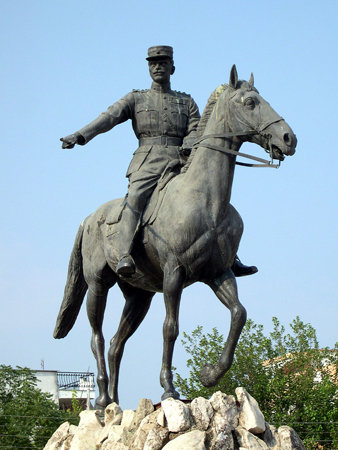
A statue in Karditsa

== Political career ==
The Republic that he had helped found proved an unstable one. Coups, counter-coups, the conflict between Venizelists/Republicans and Royalists, and constant economic problems plagued Greece. Plastiras, persecuted during the Pangalos dictatorship, attempted to lead a coup in March 1933, after the anti-Venizelists won the elections, but facing universal reaction (even from Venizelos himself), he was forced to flee abroad. Finally, after the failed Venizelist revolt of 1935, although still abroad, he was condemned in absentia to death. Nonetheless he maintained a high prestige as a war hero and because of his integrity and staunch Republicanism.

He played a role in the creation of the EDES resistance group, whose titular leadership he had despite his will, after discussions with Komninos Pyromaglou.

He returned to Greece in 1945, after his selection as prime minister following the December events of 1944, primarily because he was a commonly accepted personality. Plastiras attempted to tread a middle path between the British, who were supporting the returned government-in-exile and the return of King George II, and the democratic-leftist guerilla of the EAM/ELAS. During his premiership, the Varkiza Agreement was signed. His moderate policies and republican sympathies earned the distrust of the British, and he was dismissed after only three months in office, when the Press published a letter of him during the war, proposing the German intervention to stop the Greco-Italian war.

In 1949, after the end of the Greek Civil War, Plastiras founded a new party, the Progressive Liberal Party which transformed into National Progressive Centre Union (Εθνική Προοδευτική Ένωση Κέντρου, EPEK) for the 1950 Greek legislative election, forming a following of disappointed Liberals and left-leaning democrats. He preached a message of national reconciliation, which put him in conflict with the conservative establishment which sought to punish those who had fought to establish a communist government. Together with Sofoklis Venizelos and George Papandreou, Plastiras formed a coalition government in 1950, which fell, however, when his partners retired. In the September 1951 elections, EPEK emerged as the strongest of the centrist parties. Plastiras formed a coalition government with Sofoklis Venizelos's Liberals, and attempted to address the great problems of the country. His government initiated the economic recovery and the reconstruction of Greece. A monument to this is the construction of the dam at the Tavropos (Megdovas) River to form a lake, a program that he initiated. The lake and dam, both formerly named Tavropos, now bear his name. His policy of conciliation, however, was bitterly assailed from the right, distrusted from the left, and undermined even by members of his own cabinet. A defining moment of his government was the conviction and execution of Nikos Belogiannis in March 1952 despite international protest. After losing the elections of November 1952, his political career, and with it the liberal 'Centrist Intermission', came to an end. He died in poverty in 1953 in Athens.

Political offices
Preceded by George Papandreou	Prime Minister of Greece; 3 January 1945 – 9 April 1945	Succeeded by Petros Voulgaris
Preceded by Sofoklis Venizelos	Prime Minister of Greece; 15 April 1950 – 21 August 1950	Succeeded by Sofoklis Venizelos
Preceded by Sofoklis Venizelos	Prime Minister of Greece; 1 November 1951 – 11 October 1952	Succeeded by Dimitrios Kiousopoulos
