= 1961 Greek parliamentary election =

- 29 October 1961

All 300 seats in the Hellenic Parliament 151 seats needed for a majority
- Registered: 5,688,298
- Turnout: 81.60% (▲6.12pp)
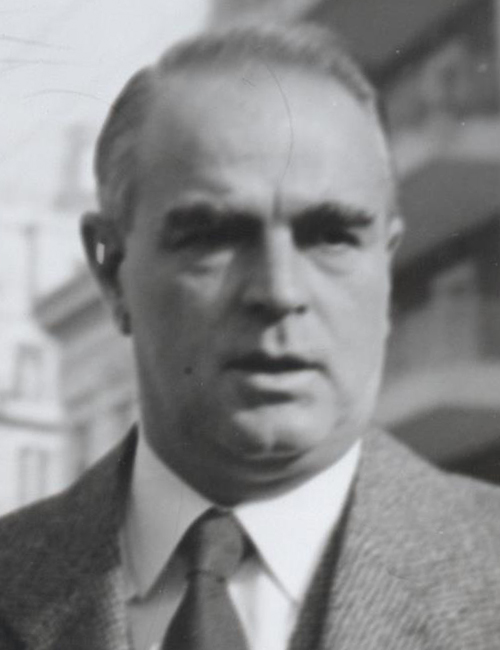

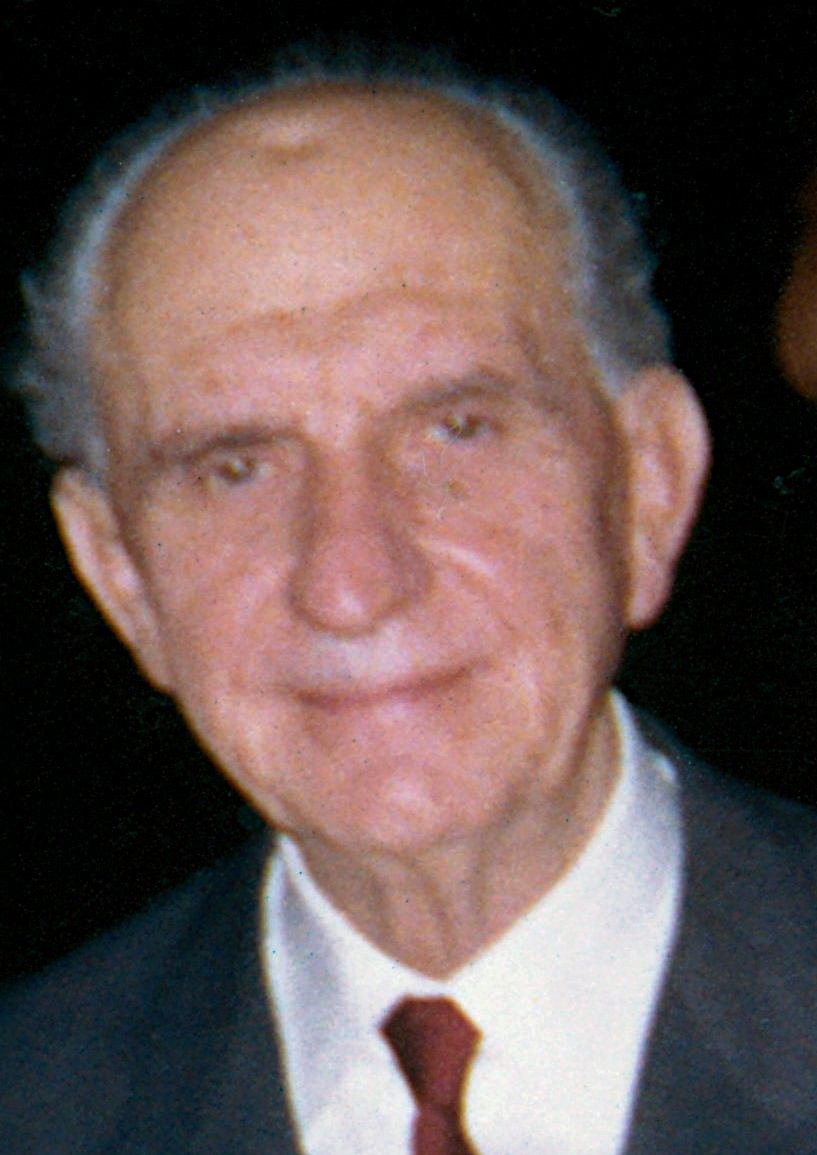

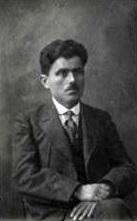
| | First party | Second party | Third party |
|---|---|---|---|
| Leader | Konstantinos Karamanlis | Georgios Papandreou | Ioannis Passalidis |
| Party | ERE | EK–KP | PAME |
| Last election | 41.16%, 171 seats | 31.29%, 46 seats | 24.42%, 60 seats |
| Seats won | 176 | 100 | 24 |
| Seat change | ▲5 | ▲54 | ▼36 |
| Popular vote | 2,347,824 | 1,555,442 | 675,867 |
| Percentage | 50.81% | 33.66% | 14.63% |
| Swing | ▲9.65 pp | ▲2.37 pp | ▼9.79 pp |
Prime Minister before election
Konstantinos Karamanlis
ERE
Prime Minister after election
Konstantinos Karamanlis
ERE

Parliamentary elections were held in Greece on 29 October 1961 to elect members of the Hellenic Parliament. The result was a third consecutive victory for Konstantinos Karamanlis and his National Radical Union (ERE), which won 176 of the 300 seats.

== Results ==
| Party | Votes | % | Seats | +/– |
|---|---|---|---|---|
| National Radical Union | 2,347,824 | 50.81 | 176 | +5 |
| Centre Union–Progressive Party | 1,555,442 | 33.66 | 100 | +54 |
| All-Democratic Agricultural Front | 675,867 | 14.63 | 24 | –36 |
| List of Independents | 41,550 | 0.90 | 0 | 0 |
| Total | 4,620,683 | 100.00 | 300 | 0 |
| Valid votes | 4,620,683 | 99.55 | | |
| Invalid/blank votes | 20,803 | 0.45 | | |
| Total votes | 4,641,486 | 100.00 | | |
| Registered voters/turnout | 5,688,298 | 81.60 | | |
Source: Nohlen & Stöver

== Aftermath ==
The elections were quickly denounced by both main opposition parties, the leftist United Democratic Left (campaigning as part of the All-Democratic Agricultural Front) and the Centre Union. They refused to recognise the result because of the numerous cases of voter intimidation and irregularities, such as sudden massive increases in support for ERE against historical patterns and the voting by deceased persons. The Centre Union alleged that the election result had been staged by the agents of the shadowy deep state (παρακράτος), including the army leadership, the Greek Central Intelligence Service and the notoriously right-wing National Guard Defence Battalions, according to a prepared emergency plan codenamed Pericles (Σχέδιο «Περικλής»). Although irregularities certainly occurred, the existence of Pericles was never proven, and it is uncertain that the interference in the elections had radically influenced the outcome. Nevertheless, Centre Union leader George Papandreou initiated an "unrelenting struggle" ("ανένδοτος αγών") until new and fair elections were held. Thus, the 1961 elections became known in the Greek political history as the "elections of violence and fraud" (εκλογές της βίας και νοθείας).

== Sources ==
- Clogg, Richard (1987). Parties and Elections in Greece: The Search for Legitimacy. Duke University Press. ISBN 978-0-8223-0794-5.
