= People's Party (Greece) =

People's Party Λαϊκὸν Κόμμα
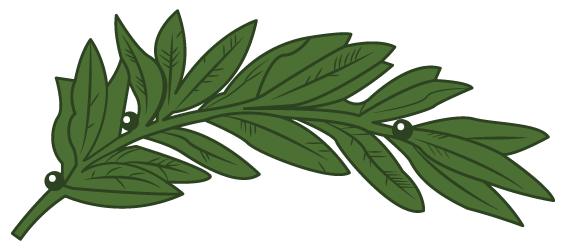
- Founder: Dimitrios Gounaris
- Founded: 1920
- Dissolved: 1958
- Preceded by: National Party
- Merged into: National Radical Union
- Ideology: Monarchism; Conservatism; Anti-Venizelism
- Political position: Right-wing
- Colours: Blue

The People's Party or Populist Party (Greek: Λαϊκὸν Κόμμα, romanized: Laïkòn Kómma) was a conservative and pro-monarchist Greek political party founded by Dimitrios Gounaris, the main political rival of Eleftherios Venizelos and his Liberal Party. The party existed from 1920 until 1958.

== History ==
Gounaris founded the party out of the Nationalist Party in October 1920, after his return from exile in Corsica. Gounaris and his parliamentary candidates campaigned for the withdrawal of the Hellenic Army from Asia Minor, which it occupied under the terms of the Treaty of Sèvres in the aftermath of World War I. The party was triumphant in the 1920 Greek general election and formed successive governments under Gounaris, Nikolaos Stratos and Petros Protopapadakis.

However, it failed to live up to its promise to bring the troops back home and became more entangled in Asia Minor than their Liberal Party predecessors. To complicate matters further, after the death of King Alexander on October 25, 1920, it brought back exiled Constantine I which cost Greece the support of her former Entente Allies. Defeat in the Greco-Turkish War (1919-1922) and the subsequent Asia Minor disaster put an end to its rule as Greek military leaders overthrew the government they viewed as responsible for the national catastrophe.

Its leaders, including Dimitrios Gounaris, were executed after a short trial and the party suffered great losses in the following elections. Nevertheless, it returned to power, in 1933 under the leadership of Panagis Tsaldaris and in 1935 played a leading part in the restoration of monarchy with the return of King George II.

After Panagis Tsaldaris's death in 1936, Konstantinos Tsaldaris led the party and in the legislative elections of 1946 it achieved a huge victory. The party supported the restoration of George II in the plebiscite of 1946, during a period of fierce civil conflict. Nevertheless, Konstantinos Tsaldaris resigned, in order that a government of national unity (centre-liberals and conservatives) could be formed under the leadership of the Liberal politician Themistoklis Sophoulis. This government with the participation of both the People's Party and the Liberal Party led the country during the civil war.

The People's party remained the dominant power of the right until 1950, but, in 1951, the Greek Rally of retired General Alexandros Papagos swept the election. A number of prominent Populists, including future Prime Minister Constantine Karamanlis, defected to the new party.

Relegated to the margins of Greek politics, the once-proud party fought an election for the last time in 1958. It was then dissolved by its last leader, Konstantinos Tsaldaris. The bulk of its supporters had already joined Karamanlis' National Radical Union, the successor of the Greek Rally.
