= Alexandros Papagos =

Greek military leader and politician (1883–1955)

- Αλέξανδρος Παπάγος
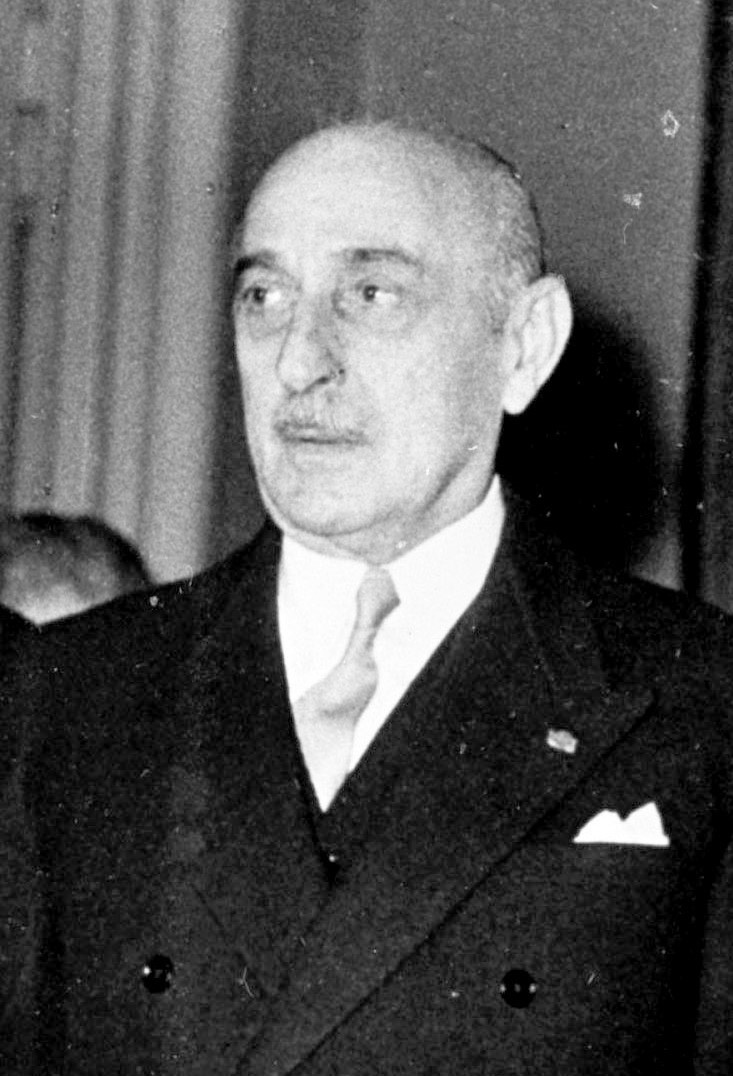
- Papagos as Prime Minister

Prime Minister of Greece
- In office 19 November 1952 – 4 October 1955
- Monarch: Paul
- Preceded by: Dimitrios Kiousopoulos (caretaker)
- Succeeded by: Konstantinos Karamanlis

Personal details
- Born: 9 December 1883 Athens, Kingdom of Greece
- Died: 4 October 1955 (aged 71) Athens, Kingdom of Greece
- Party: Greek Rally
- Parent(s): Leonidas Papagos; Maria Averoff
- Relatives: Georgios Averoff (great-uncle)
- Education: Royal Military Academy (Belgium)
- Occupation: Minister for Military Affairs; Minister for National Defence

Military service
- Allegiance: Kingdom of Greece; Second Hellenic Republic
- Branch/service: Hellenic Army
- Years of service: 1906–1917; 1920–1922; 1926–1951
- Rank: Field Marshal
- Commands: Commander-in-Chief of the Hellenic Armed Forces; Chief of the Hellenic National Defense General Staff; Chief of the Hellenic Army General Staff
- Battles/wars: Balkan Wars; First Balkan War; Battle of Bizani; Second Balkan War; Greco-Turkish War (1919-1922); World War II; Greco-Italian War; Battle of Greece; Capture of Korçë; Battle of Ponte Perati; Greek Civil War

Alexandros Papagos (Greek: Αλέξανδρος Παπάγος; 9 December 1883 – 4 October 1955) was a Greek military officer who led the Hellenic Army in World War II and in the later stages of the subsequent Greek Civil War. Afterwards, he served as Prime Minister of Greece from 1952 to 1955.

The only Greek army career officer to rise to the rank of Field Marshal, Papagos became the first Chief of the Hellenic National Defence General Staff from 1950 until his resignation the following year. He then entered politics, founding the nationalist Greek Rally party and becoming the country's Prime Minister after his victory in the 1952 elections.

His premiership was shaped by the Cold War and the aftermath of the Greek Civil War, and was defined by several key events, including Greece becoming a member of NATO; U.S. military bases being allowed on Greek territory and the formation of a powerful and vehemently anti-communist security apparatus. Papagos' tenure also saw the start of the Greek economic miracle, most famously devaluing the drachma by half in 1953, and rising tensions with Britain and Turkey during the Cyprus Emergency over the Cyprus issue and over the Istanbul pogrom. He died in office in October 1955, hand-picking Stephanos Stephanopoulos as his successor; King Paul intervened and ordered Konstantinos Karamanlis to form a government.

== Military career ==
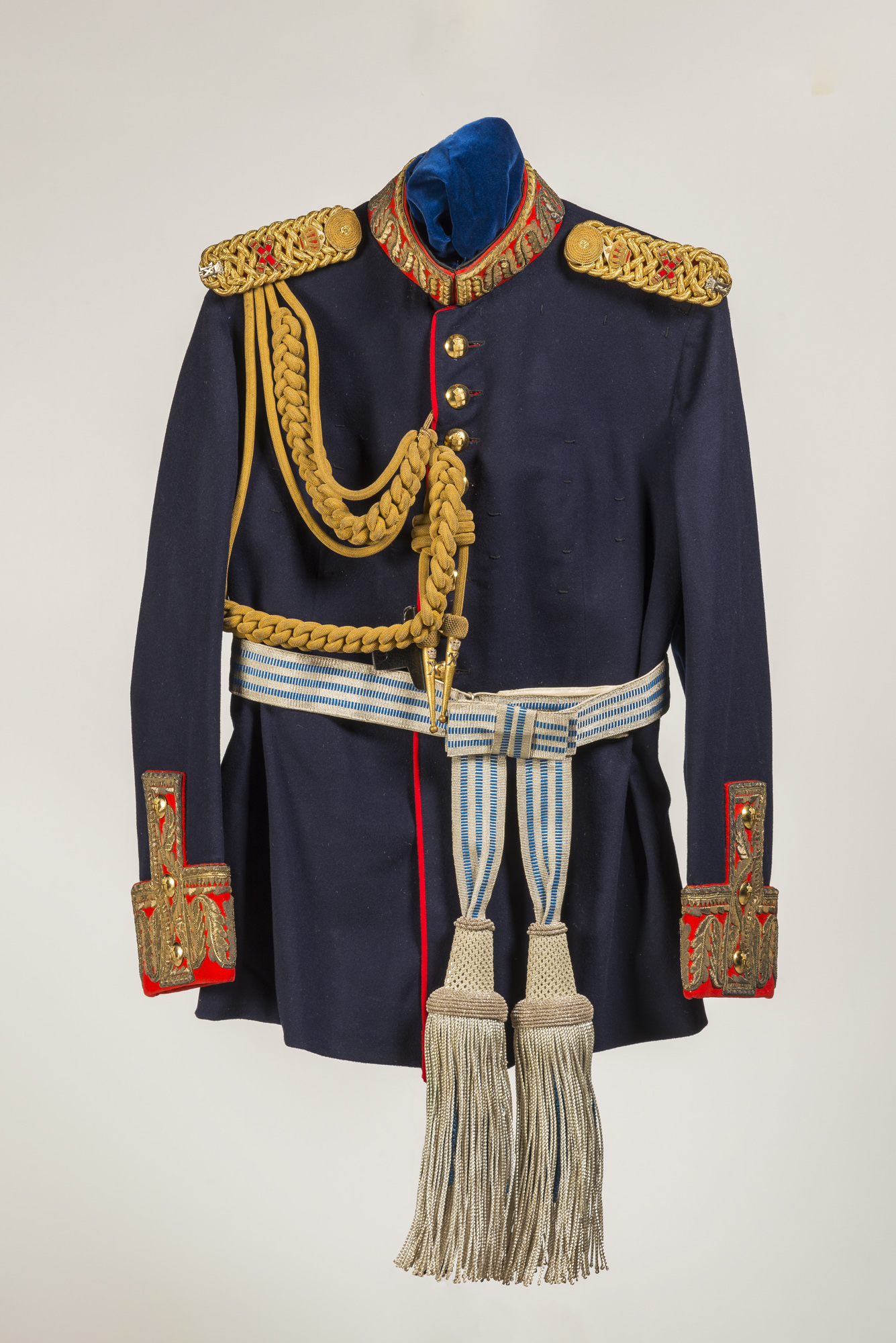
Upper part of Papagos ceremonial uniform, Athens War Museum.

Alexandros Papagos was born in Athens on 9 December 1883. His father was Major General Leonidas Papagos from the island of Syros, who occupied senior posts during his military career, including Director of Personnel at the War Ministry and aide-de-camp to the King. His mother was Maria Averoff, daughter of the politician Dimitrios Averoff and niece of the magnate George Averoff. As a result, Alexandros Papagos was born into the Greek social elite, with close ties to the royal palace. He initially entered the Law School of the University of Athens, but soon switched to a military career. In 1902 he entered the Brussels Military Academy and followed it up with studies at the Cavalry Application School at Ypres. He was commissioned as a cavalry second lieutenant in the Hellenic Army on 15 July 1906. In 1911 he married Maria Kallinski, the daughter of Lt. General Andreas Kallinskis-Roïdis.

Promoted to lieutenant in 1911, Papagos participated in the Balkan Wars of 1912–13 attached to the field headquarters of the Crown Prince, and from 1913, King Constantine. In 1913 he was promoted to captain. After the Balkan Wars, he served in the 1st Cavalry Regiment and the staff of III Army Corps. Promoted to major in 1916, he was appointed chief of staff of the Cavalry Brigade. A confirmed monarchist, he was dismissed from the army in 1917 as a result of the National Schism. Under the 1917–1920 government of Eleftherios Venizelos, Papagos was sent to internal exile in Ios, Thira, Milos, and Crete.

He was recalled to active service in 1920 following the electoral victory of the monarchist parties, with the retroactive rank of lieutenant colonel, serving once more as chief of staff of the Cavalry Brigade and of the Cavalry Division during the Asia Minor Campaign against the Turkish National Movement of Mustafa Kemal. After the disastrous defeat of the Greek army in August 1922 and the subsequent outbreak of a military revolt, he was once more dismissed from the army, but was recalled in 1926, with the rank of colonel. In 1927 he was appointed commander of the 1st Cavalry Division. Promoted to major general in 1930, in 1931, he was named Deputy Chief of the Hellenic Army General Staff. In 1933–35 he served as Inspector of Cavalry, followed by commands of the I and III Army Corps. He was promoted to Lt. General in 1935.

=== Restoration of the Monarchy and the Metaxas Regime ===
On 10 October 1935, along with the service chiefs of the Navy (Rear Admiral Dimitrios Oikonomou) and the Air Force (Air Vice Marshal Georgios Reppas), he toppled the government of Panagis Tsaldaris and became Minister for Military Affairs in the new cabinet of Georgios Kondylis, which immediately declared the restoration of the Greek monarchy. Papagos remained Minister of Military Affairs until Kondylis' resignation on 30 November, and was re-appointed to the post in the succeeding Konstantinos Demertzis cabinet on 13 December 1935 until 5 March 1936. On 5 March 1936 he was named Inspector-General of the Army, holding the post until 31 July. On the next day, 1 August, he was promoted to Chief of the Army General Staff. From his position, he employed the Army to support Ioannis Metaxas' declaration of dictatorship on 4 August 1936.

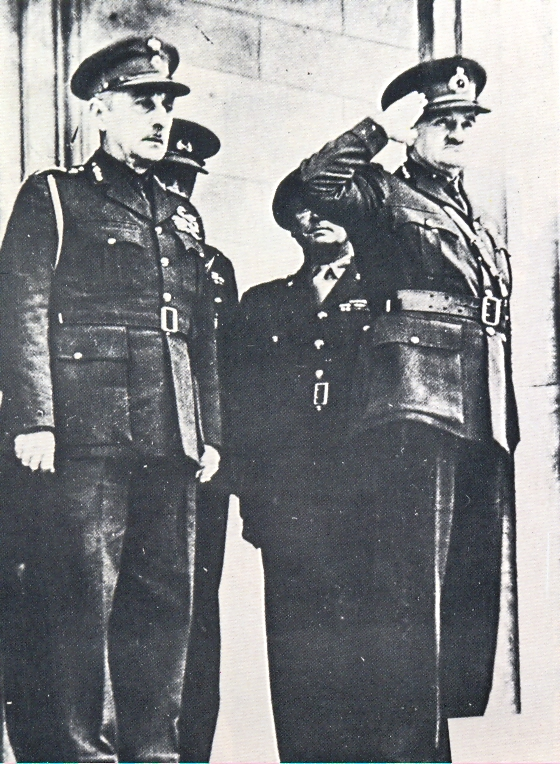
Papagos (left) with General Archibald Wavell, General Officer Commanding-in-Chief of the Middle East Command of the British Army, in Athens in January 1941.

As head of the army and the palace's man, Papagos was a crucial figure in Metaxas' dictatorial regime. In 1940, a special law was passed to allow him to continue in his position, despite being over the statutory retirement age for general officers. As Chief of the General Staff, he actively tried to reorganize and reequip the Army for the oncoming Second World War.

=== World War II ===
At the outbreak of the Greco-Italian War on 28 October 1940, he became Commander-in-Chief of the Army, a post he retained until the capitulation of the Greek armed forces following the German invasion of Greece in April 1941. Papagos directed Greek operations against Italy along the Greek-Albanian border. The Greek army, under his command, managed to halt the Italian advance by 8 November and forced them to withdraw deep into Albania between 18 November and 23 December. The successes of the Greek Army brought him fame and applause. A second Italian offensive between 9 and 16 March 1941 was repulsed. Despite this success, Papagos chose to maintain the bulk of the Greek Army in Albania, and was unwilling to order a gradual withdrawal to reinforce the north-eastern border (and a defense along the so-called Haliacmon line, considered to be more defensible) as German intervention came closer. After the German invasion on 6 April 1941, outnumbered Greek forces in Macedonia fiercely resisted the German offensive at the Metaxas Line, but were outflanked by the enemy and so Papagos endorsed their surrender. Soon after, the Army of Epirus capitulated and by 23 April, the Greek government was forced to flee to Crete.

==== Occupation Years ====
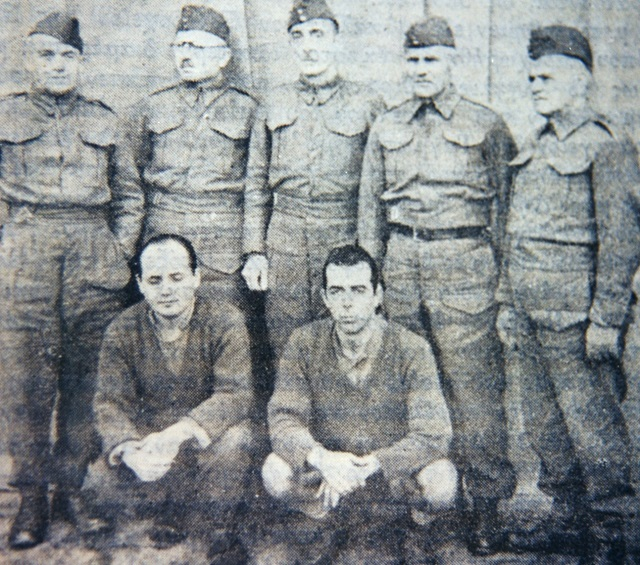
Papagos (center) with other officers as POW in Dachau.

Papagos also resigned from the army on 23 April but did not follow the King and his government into exile, remaining in occupied Greece. He spent most of the occupation in de facto house arrest. In 1943 he established, with other former army officers, a resistance organization, called Military Hierarchy (Στρατιωτική Ιεραρχία). In July of the same year, he was arrested by the German occupation authorities and transported to Königstein Fortress were the defeated generals were kept as war prisoners. · In late April 1945 he was transferred to Tyrol together with about 140 other prominent inmates of the Dachau concentration camp, where the SS left the prisoners behind. He was liberated by the Fifth U.S. Army on 5 May 1945.

=== Greek Civil War ===
Papagos returned to Greece in May 1945. In August 1945, he was appointed an Honorary Knight Grand Cross of the Order of the British Empire by the British. He remained retired and held no active military position, but served as grand chamberlain to King Paul and in July 1947 was promoted to the exceptionally rare rank of full general as a token of honour.

In January 1949, he was once again appointed Commander-in-Chief in the ongoing Greek Civil War. Papagos led the final victory of the government forces over the Communist Democratic Army of Greece, employing extensive American material aid (including napalm equipped aircraft ), and the extensive deployment of Hellenic Mountain Raider Companies of Special Forces (LOK), during the Grammos-Vitsi campaign between February and October of that year.

The British officer Christopher Woodhouse, who had been active in the Greek Resistance and knew the country well, considered that his predecessor, Lt. General Dimitrios Giatzis, had "virtually won the war" before his dismissal, but that Papagos' appointment was beneficial because Papagos, through his seniority and prestige, "could impose his own plans and wishes on both the Greek high command and the allied military missions, which had been for some months at loggerheads with each other." He further qualifies Papagos as a "superlative staff officer, impeccable in logistic planning and exact calculation, a master of the politics and diplomacy of war", but "with little experience of high command in battle", and a tendency to command from Athens, seldom even visiting the front lines. Papagos' aloof leadership style led to clashes with one of the most important subordinate commanders, the impetuous Lt. General Thrasyvoulos Tsakalotos.

As a reward for his services, he was awarded the title of Field Marshal on 28 October 1949, the only Greek career officer to ever hold this rank. He continued to serve in his capacity as Commander-in-Chief until 1951, while Greece was in a state of political instability, with splinter parties and weak politicians unable to provide a firm government.

== Political career ==
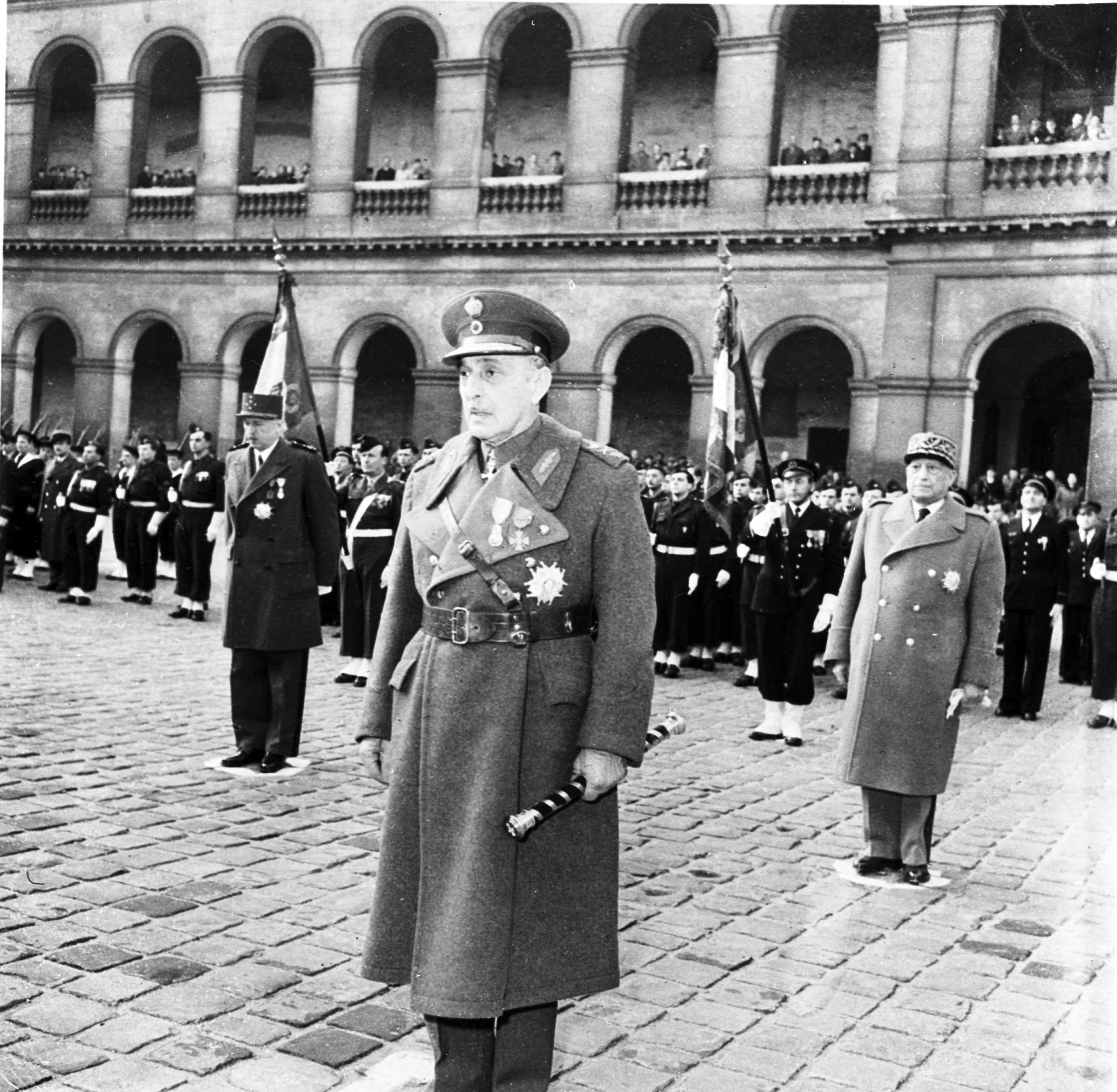
Prime minister Papagos at the courtyard of Les Invalides, after being decorated with the Médaille militaire during his visit to France (1954).

In May 1951, Papagos resigned from the Army to enter politics. He founded the Greek Rally (Greek: Ελληνικός Συναγερμός), modelled after De Gaulle's Rassemblement du Peuple Français, and won the September elections with 36.53 percent of the vote. For a time, the Palace feared that he might establish a dictatorship, largely due to his popularity, his image as a strong and determined leader, and the communist defeat in the civil war, which was attributed in great part to his leadership.

Despite his victory, Papagos was unable to form a government on this majority, and had to wait until the November 1952 elections, where his party tallied an impressive 49 percent of the popular vote, gaining 239 out of 300 seats in Parliament. The Field Marshal, with his popular backing and support from the Americans was an authoritative figure, leading to friction with the Royal Palace. Papagos' government successfully strived to modernize Greece (where the young and energetic Minister of Public Works, Constantine Karamanlis, first distinguished himself) and restore the economy of a country ruined by 10 years of war, but was criticized by the opposition for doing little to restore social harmony in a country still scarred from the civil war.

One of the major issues faced by Papagos was the Cyprus problem, where the Greek majority had begun clamouring for Enosis (Union) with Greece. Though reluctant to confront Great Britain, demonstrations in the streets of Athens prompted him to order Greece's UN representative to raise the issue of Cyprus before the UN General Assembly in August 1954. When the EOKA campaign to expel the British and initiate Enosis in Cyprus began in 1955, Papagos was in declining health and unwilling to act. The clashes in Cyprus, however, led to a deterioration of Greco-Turkish relations, culminating in the Istanbul Pogrom in September.

In January 1955, Papagos began to develop gastric issues, a result of his imprisonment during World War II; he appointed Stefanos Stefanopoulos to serve as provisional premier during his illness. However, Papagos condition worsened, and he died of a lung hemorrhage on 4 October 1955.

The Athens suburb of Papagou, where the Ministry of Defence is located, is named after him.

== Honours ==
=== National ===
Grand Cross of the Order of the Redeemer
Grand Cross of the Order of Saints George and Constantine
Grand Cross of the Order of George I
Grand Cross of the Order of the Phoenix
Commanders Cross of the Cross of Valour
War Cross
Medal of Military Merit

=== Foreign ===
Knight Grand Cross of the Order of the British Empire
Médaille militaire
Croix de Guerre

== Sources ==
- Margaritis, Giorgos (2001). Ιστορία του Ελληνικού Εμφυλίου Πολέμου 1946-1949, Τόμος 2 [History of the Greek Civil War 1946–1949, Volume 2] (Second ed.). Athens: Vivliorama. ISBN 960-8087-13-9.
- Woodhouse, Christopher Montague (2002). The struggle for Greece, 1941–1949. C. Hurst & Co. Publishers. ISBN 978-1-85065-487-2.

Political offices
Preceded by Georgios Kondylis	Minister for Military Affairs; 10 October – 30 November 1935	Succeeded by Konstantinos Demertzis
Preceded by Konstantinos Demertzis	Minister for Military Affairs; 13 December 1935 – 5 March 1936	Succeeded by Ioannis Metaxas
Preceded by Ioannis Pitsikas	Minister for National Defence; 23 November – 2 December 1952	Succeeded by Panagiotis Kanellopoulos
Preceded by Dimitrios Kiousopoulos	Prime Minister of Greece; 19 November 1952 – 6 October 1955	Succeeded by Constantine Karamanlis
Party political offices
New political party	President of the Greek Rally; 1951–1955	Succeeded by Constantine Karamanlis as President of the National Radical Union
Military offices
Preceded by Lt. General Aristeidis Chasapidis	Chief of the Hellenic Army General Staff; 1936–1940	Succeeded by Lt. General Konstantinos Pallis
Vacant ad hoc position	Commander-in-Chief of the Greek Armed Forces; 1940–1941	Greek capitulation
Vacant ad hoc position Title last held by Alexandros Othonaios (in 1944–45)	Commander-in-Chief of the Greek Armed Forces; 1949–1950	Creation of the General Staff of National Defence
New institution	Chief of the Hellenic National Defense General Staff; 1950–1951	Succeeded by Lt. General Theodoros Grigoropoulos
