= 1950 Greek parliamentary election =

- 5 March 1950

All 250 seats in the Hellenic Parliament 126 seats needed for a majority
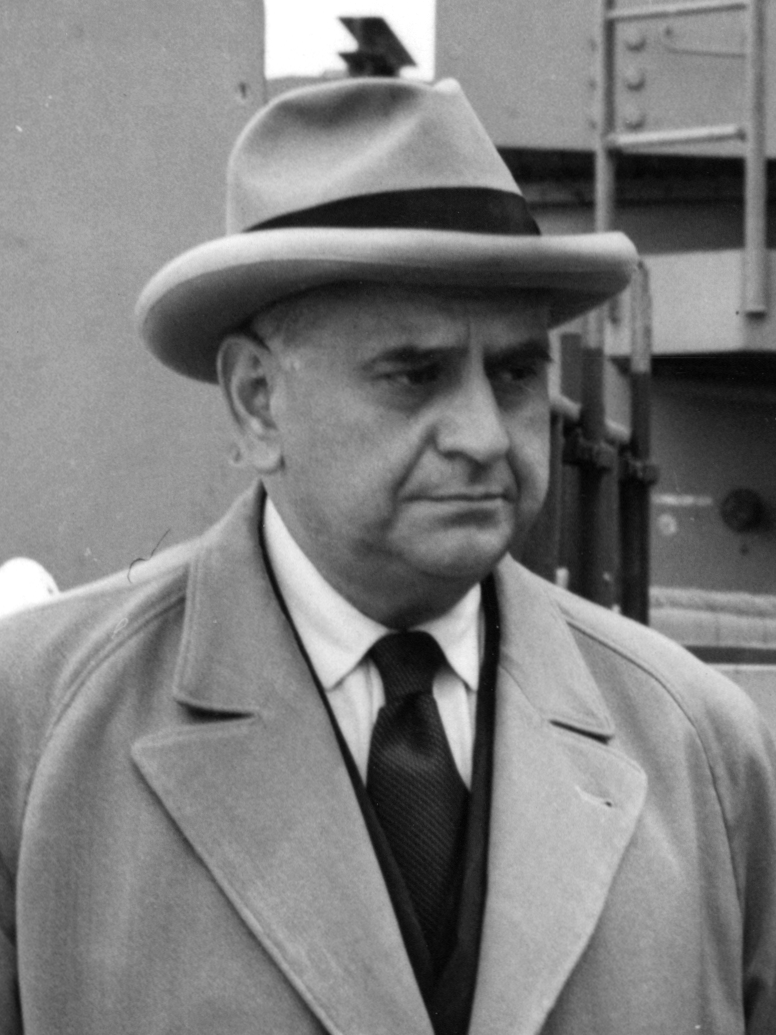

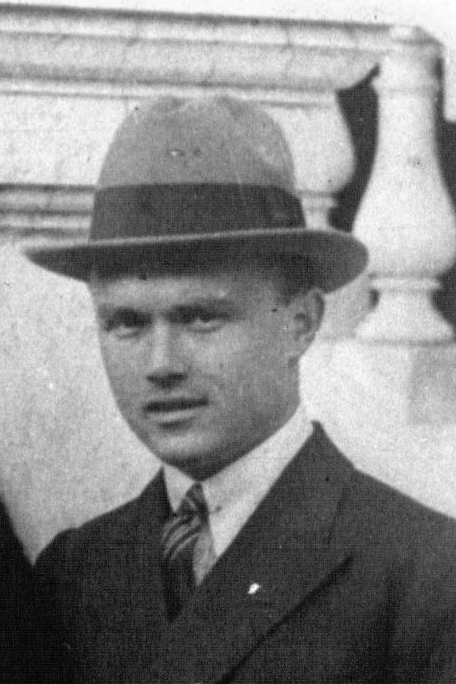

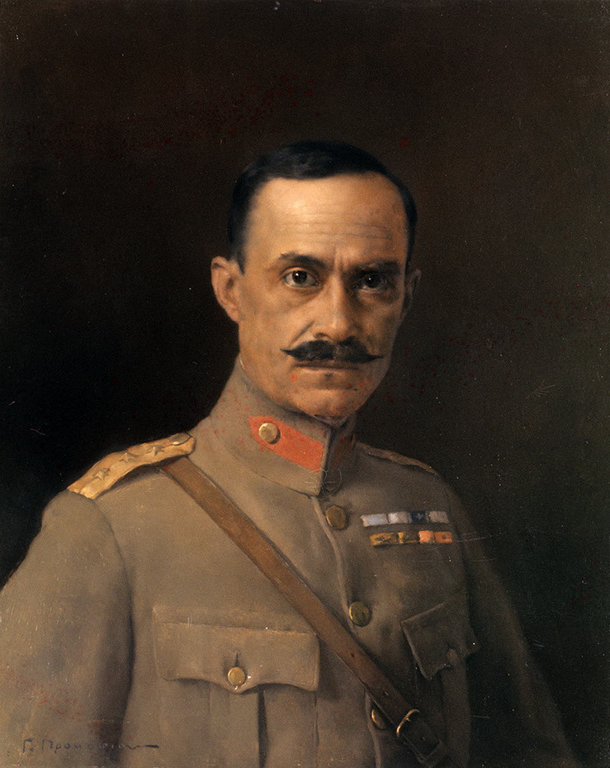

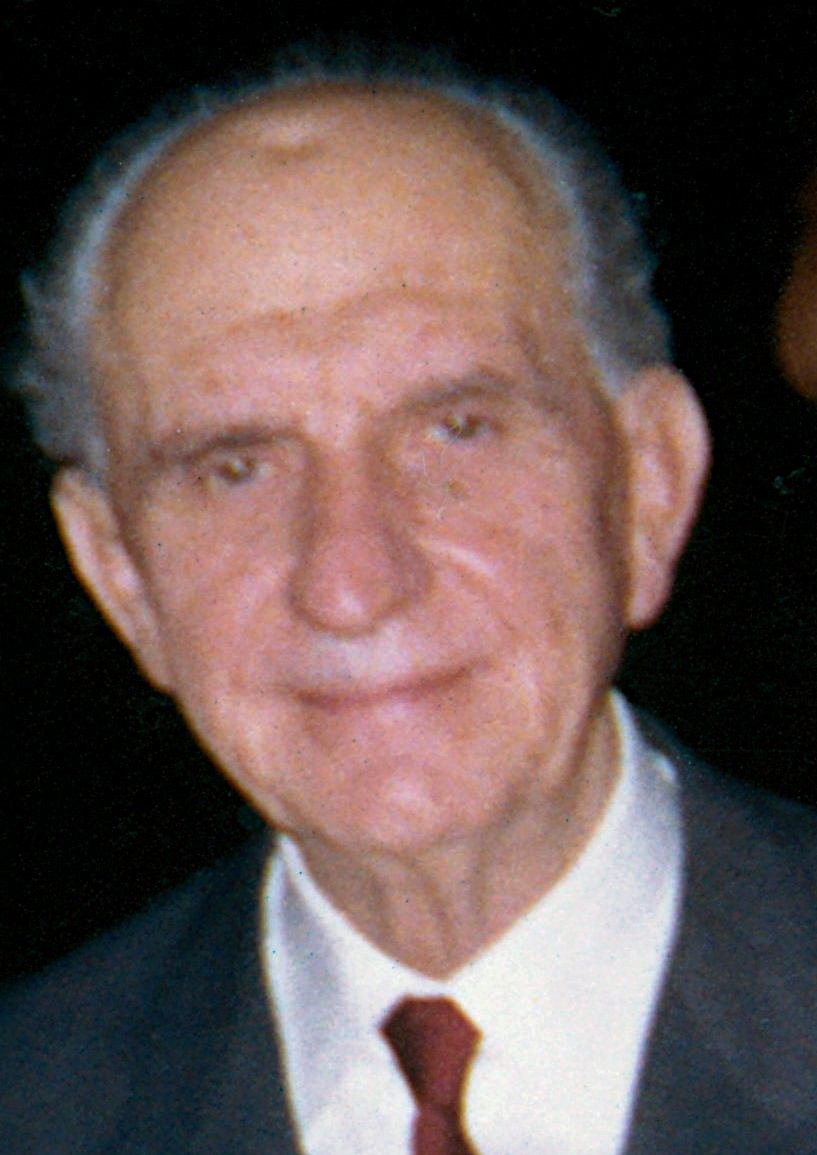
	First party	Second party	Third party
Leader	Konstantinos Tsaldaris	Sofoklis Venizelos	Nikolaos Plastiras
Party	People's Party	Liberal	EPEK
Seats won	62	56	45
Popular vote	317,312	291,083	277,739
Percentage	18.79%	17.24%	16.45%
	Fourth party	Fifth party	Sixth party
Leader	Georgios Papandreou	Alexandros Svolos	Konstantinos Maniadakis
Party	KGP	DP	PAP
Seats won	35	18	16
Popular vote	180,185	163,824	137,618
Percentage	10.67%	9.70%	8.15%
- Results by constituency
Prime Minister before election
Alexandros Diomidis
Liberal
Prime Minister after election
Sofoklis Venizelos
Liberal

Parliamentary elections were held in Greece on 5 March 1950. The People's Party emerged as the largest party in Parliament, winning 62 of the 250 seats.

== Results ==
Party	Votes	%	Seats
People's Party	317,312	18.79	62
Liberal Party	291,083	17.24	56
National Progressive Center Union (Note: Of the 45 seats won by the alliance, the Progressive Liberal Party won 23, the Democratic Progressive Party won 13.)	277,739	16.45	45
Georgios Papandreou Party	180,185	10.67	35
Democratic Alignment	163,824	9.70	18
Politically Independent Alignment	137,618	8.15	16
National Reconstruction Front	88,979	5.27	7
National Party of Greece	61,575	3.65	7
Party of Farmers and Labourers	44,308	2.62	3
New Party	42,157	2.50	1
National Party of Working People	26,925	1.59	0
Party for the National Union	14,256	0.84	0
Greek Working People's Party	9,132	0.54	0
National Resistance Party of Greece	8,260	0.49	0
Party Alliance of Greek Workers and Political Refresh Movement	8,127	0.48	0
Independent Liberal Party	3,087	0.18	0
List of Independents	2,979	0.18	0
Agricultural Party	2,191	0.13	0
Christian Labour Agricultural Party	1,027	0.06	0
Christian Political Union	429	0.03	0
Greek Drivers' Party	157	0.01	0
Independent Farmer Party	146	0.01	0
National Independent Party of War Wounded and Victims of Greece	145	0.01	0
Labour-Professional Party of Greece	97	0.01	0
Independent Agricultural Party of Greek People	63	0.00	0
Professional and Industrial Party of Greece	42	0.00	0
National Byzantine Party of Greece	20	0.00	0
Independents	6,742	0.40	0
Total	1,688,605	100.00	250
Valid votes	1,688,605	99.57	
Invalid/blank votes	7,223	0.43	
Total votes	1,695,828	100.00	
Source: Nohlen & Stöver
