= Venizelism =

Political movement in Greece

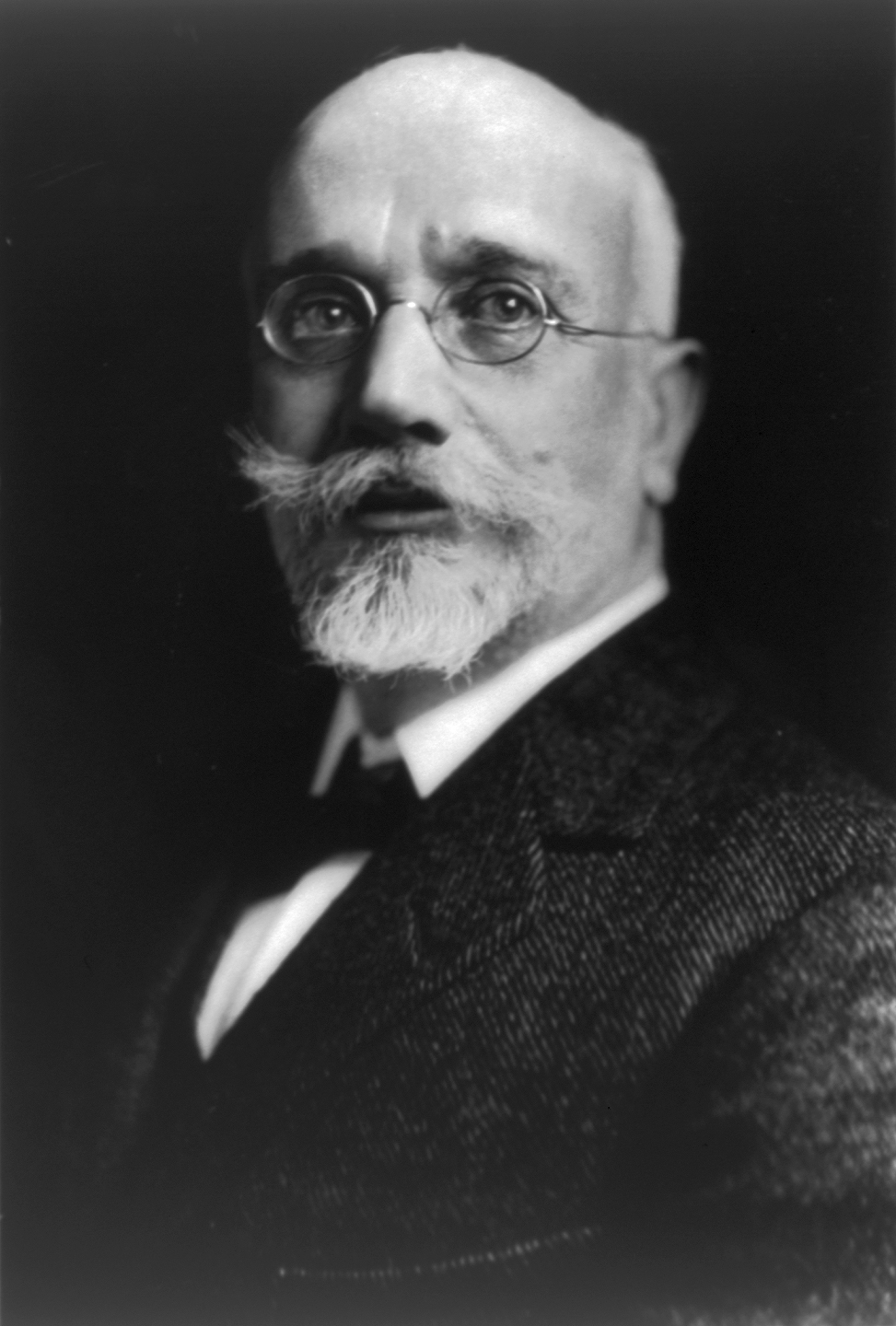
Eleftherios Venizelos, after whom Venizelism is named

Venizelism (Greek: Βενιζελισμός, romanized: Venizelismos) was one of the major political movements in Greece beginning from the 1910s. The movement first formed under Eleftherios Venizelos in the 1910s and saw a resurgence of support in the 1960s when Georgios Papandreou united a coalition of old Venizelists and nationalist politicians.

The movement was characterized by the beliefs of Eleftherios Venizelos and the ideas of Greek irredentism supporting the Megali Idea. It had a Francophile stance as the ideas of the French Revolution and the idea of one state which should have all the lands predominantly inhabited by a single ethnicity. In WWI, the Venizelists wished to join the Entente, mainly due to the entrance of the Ottoman Empire and Bulgaria, which was one of the highest chances to gain all lands Greeks claim and thus fulfilling the Megali idea. Despite popular misconceptions, Venizelism is a movement that sides with monarchy, and it calls for a ruling class in which the urban class can rise to the ranks by merit. Additionally, the king should originate from the same country that he is ruling, thus not having loyalties to foreign interests. Venizelism called for early and more moderate capitalistic economic policies such as open markets, but the government should approve those markets. The movement had its strongest support in Crete, Thrace, Epirus, the North Aegean islands, and Macedonia.

== Main ideas ==
Named after Eleftherios Venizelos, the key characteristics of Venizelism are:

- Greek irredentism: The support of the Megali Idea.
- Greek nationalism: it is liberal-based nationalism.
- Liberal democracy: Venizelists represented upcoming urban classes that were against the old conservative establishment, which also had close ties with the palace.
- Pro-Western: Alliance with the Entente against the Central Powers during WWI, and with the Allies during WWII. Also pro-Western during the Cold War, but later diverged with direct confrontation between Greek nationalist forces in Cyprus against British colonial forces.
- Republicanism: Despite Venizelos' moderation regarding the monarchy, most of his supporters were in favour of a Republic, on the French standards.
- Mixed economic policies: from economically liberal to social democratic policies.
- Anti-Bolshevism: Venizelos rejected the bolshevik system and was the main introducer of the Idionymon anticommunist law in 1929. In a speech he had delivered in the Greek parliament, he had stated that socialism is democratic and Bolshevism authoritarian.

In the contemporary sense the ideology incorporates national liberalism, civic nationalism, economic liberalism, liberal democracy, pro-Europeanism, republicanism, secularism, centrism, radical centrism and generally moves from centre-right to social democracy.

== History ==
=== Liberal Party ===
Venizelos' liberal party ruled Greece from 1910 until 1916. That year, determined to enter World War I on the Entente side, Venizelos rebelled against the king and formed a Provisional Government of National Defence in Thessaloniki. Venizelos regained full control of the country in 1917 and ruled until losing the 1920 elections. The strongest support for Venizelism came in the "New Greece" gained after the Balkan Wars of 1912–1913, consisting of Crete, Thrace, Epirus, the North Aegean islands, and Macedonia. By contrast, people in "Old Greece" tended to be more much royalist. The fact that in 1916 King Constantine I had allowed the Bulgarians to occupy parts of Macedonia and had been willing to contemplate giving up all of recently gained "New Greece" in the north to the Bulgarians to weaken the Venizelist movement cemented the identification of people in northern Greece with Venizelism. Greek refugees from Turkey also tended to be firmly Venizelist, at least until the 1930s and the signing of the Greco-Turkish friendship agreement by Venizelos (1930).

Voters started to favour a balance between Venizelos and Constantine I. This crisis period for Venizelos occurred when Greece experienced a lagging economy, growing political corruption, profiteering by the few, and eight continuous years of mobilization.

After a crisis period (including two short-lived pro-Venizelist military governments after Nikolaos Plastiras 1922 revolution) the liberals returned to power from 1928 until 1932. Venizelists Sophoklis Venizelos and Georgios Papandreou formed the core of the Greek government in exile during the Axis Occupation of Greece (1941–1944), and held power a number of times in the 1950s.

=== Centre Union ===
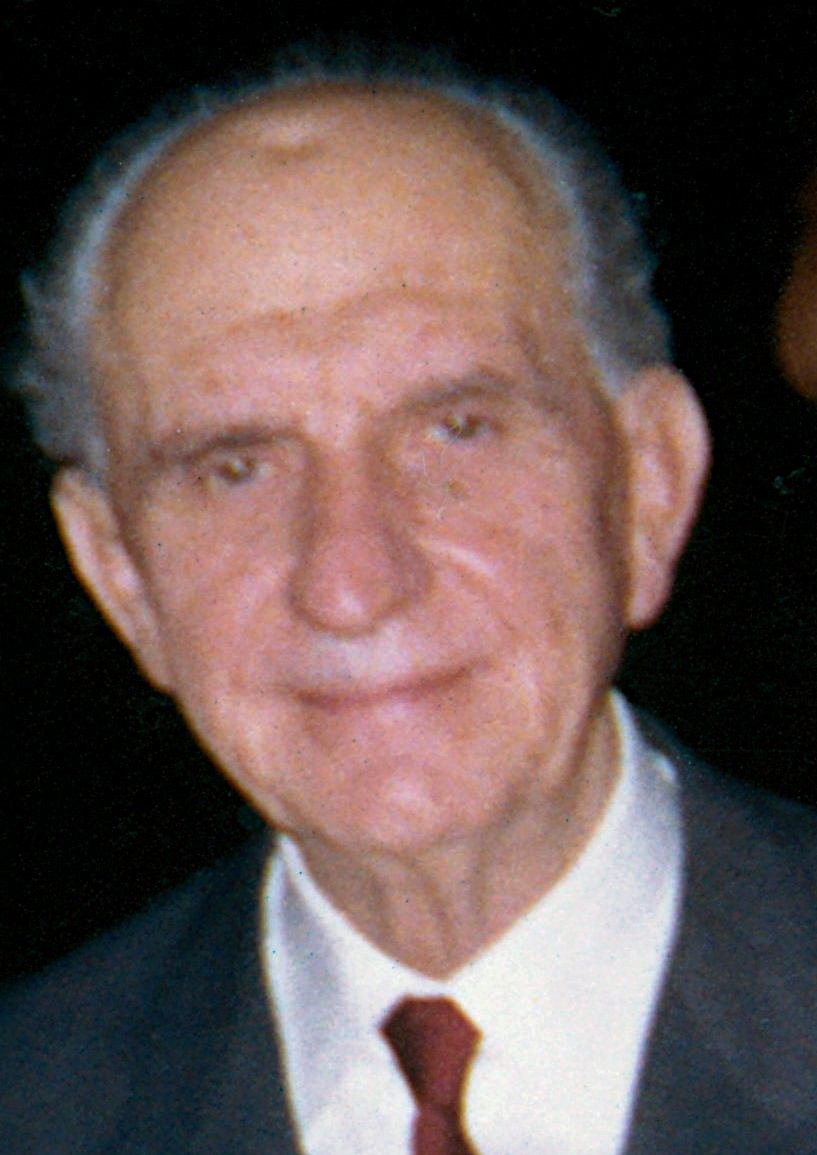
Georgios Papandreou, leader of the Centre Union, which was formed by Venizelists

Georgios Papandreou created the Centre Union party in 1961, as a coalition of old Venizelists and progressive politicians. In 1963 the party was elected and held power until 1965, when its right wing broke ranks in the events known as the Iouliana. The current Union of Centrists claims to be the ideological continuation of the old party Centre Union.

=== Centrist Democratic Union ===
After the 1967–1974 Junta, Venizelists formed the Centre Union – New Forces party, which then evolved into the Union of the Democratic Centre (Greek: ΕΔΗΚ). While the Venizelist legacy was still popular, election results were disappointing as the abolition of the monarchy, the dilution of support for Greek nationalism after the seven years of the junta and the 1974 Turkish invasion of Cyprus, and Karamanlis' move towards the political centre had blurred the differences between the liberals and their former conservative opponents, while the socialist PASOK party was gaining support at the left side of the spectrum.

Most members of the Centre Union – New Forces party with their leader Georgios Mavros were absorbed by PASOK.

== Legacy ==
Although the image of Venizelos is still very popular in Greece today, Venizelism is no longer a significant force in Greek politics. Venizelos' prestige and his ideology's connotations of republicanism and progressive reforms meant that most mainstream political forces claimed his political heritage. There are few explicitly "Venizelist" movements today in Greece. In the 2004 elections for the European Parliament, the leading Venizelist party was the Union of Centrists, gaining only 0.54% of the Greek popular vote. An attempted revival of the original Liberal Party, under the same name, was founded in the 1980s by Venizelos' grandson, Nikitas Venizelos. The party was dissolved in 2012.

== Anti-Venizelism ==
There were also various politicians of different political orientation during the 1910s (monarchists, conservatives, part of the clergy, but also socialists/communists of the newly founded SEKE) who were against Venizelos' policies. Some points of disagreement included the Venizelos' extreme pro-Entente stance during the World War I and the National Schism (which led to the division of the country between a Venizelist and a royalist government), his policy about the Megali idea and its results (regarding the relations with Turkey and the Greeks who were still under Ottoman sovereignty) and later the Treaty of Lausanne and the population exchange.

Antivenizelism also sided with the religious minorities in Greece (Muslim, Jewish, etc.), being in general of conservative political orientation. Another common point of the anti-Venizelists was a criticism about the country's social and economic transformation/modernization, such as critics for political/economic mismanagement.

== See also ==
- Greek nationalism
- Liberalism in Greece
- Metaxism
