= Greek Rally =

Defunct political party in Greece

Greek Rally Ελληνικός Συναγερμός
- President: Alexandros Papagos (1951–1955); Konstantinos Karamanlis (1955)
- Founded: 1951
- Dissolved: 1956
- Preceded by: People's Party
- Succeeded by: National Radical Union
- Ideology: Greek nationalism Conservatism; Royalism; Anti-communism
- Political position: Right-wing
- Colours: Blue

Greek Rally (Greek: Ἑλληνικὸς Συναγερμός (ΕΣ), Ellīnikòs Synagermós (ES)) was a right-wing political party in Greece.

== History ==
Founded on 6 August 1951 by former field marshal Alexandros Papagos, the party encompassed a broad spectrum of the royalist conservative elements in Greek society and was modelled on the Charles de Gaulle's Rassemblement du Peuple Français (RPF). Throughout the years, the Greek right had become splintered. Papagos' new party managed to attract considerable support, and the Populist Uniting Party (led by Panagiotis Kanellopoulos and Stephanos Stephanopoulos) and the New Party (led by Spiros Markezinis) dissolved and merged with the Greek Rally. Later on, a large portion of the People's Party, the major right-wing party of the prewar era, defected to the Greek Rally; among the prominent defectors was Konstantinos Karamanlis.

The popularity of Papagos, who had reinstated the autonomy of the Greek military during his tenure as its commander, enabled the party to quickly eclipse the Populists. In the September 1951 general election, the Greek Rally garnered 114 parliamentary seats (taking 36.5 per cent of the vote) compared to only two for the People's Party—thus firmly establishing itself as the major force of the right. This was well short of a majority, and Papagos refused to enter a coalition. In the subsequent November 1952 general election, the Greek Rally gained 240 out of 300 seats in the Greek Parliament, an achievement helped in no small way by a change in the electoral system. The party effectively ended with the death of its leader in October 1955. His successor, Karamanlis, relaunched the party as the National Radical Union.

== See also ==
- History of Greece
- Politics of Greece
- List of political parties in Greece
