= First cabinet of Alexandros Papanastasiou =

First government of 2nd Hellenic Republic

Cabinet of Alexandros Papanastasiou
- 1st Cabinet of the Second Hellenic Republic

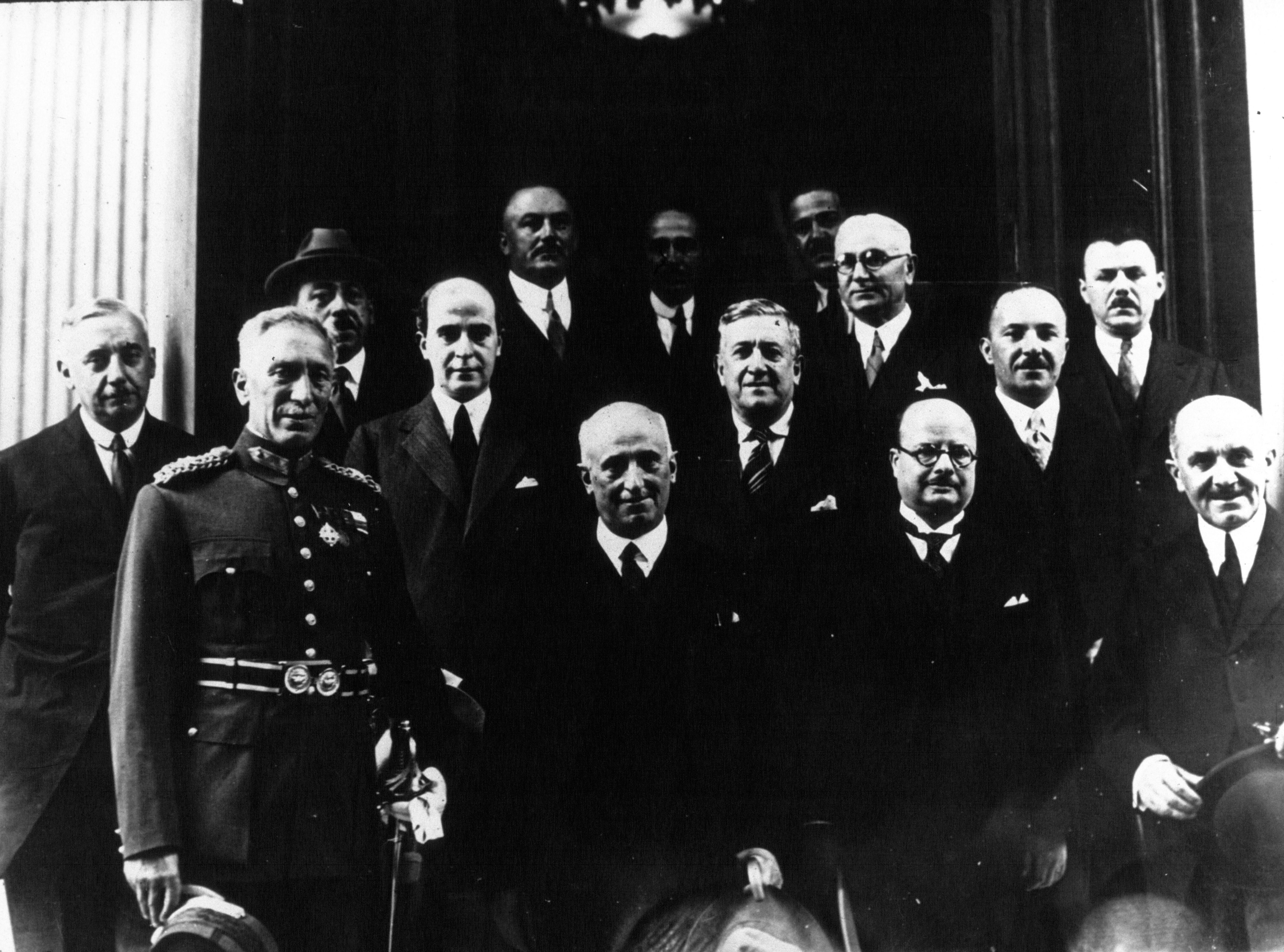
- Papanastasiou's cabinet
- Date formed: March 12, 1924
- Date dissolved: July 24, 1924

People and organisations
- Regent: Pavlos Kountouriotis
- Prime Minister: Alexandros Papanastasiou
- Total no. of members: 18
- Member party: Democratic Union -Democratic Liberals
- Status in legislature: coalition government
- Opposition party: Liberal Party
- Opposition leader: Georgios Kafantaris

History
- Election: 1923 Greek legislative election
- Predecessor: Cabinet of Georgios Kafantaris
- Successor: First Cabinet of Themistoklis Sofoulis

The first cabinet of Alexandros Papanastasiou (March–July 1924) was the first government of the Second Hellenic Republic.

Alexandros Papanastasiou, one of the most ardent anti-monarchists of the time, assumed the leadership of the government immediately after the fall of the Kafantaris government. Thirteen days after taking office, he proclaimed the establishment of a republic in Greece.

More specifically, at the National Assembly session of 24 March 1924, the government of Papanastasiou in the absence of the representatives belonging to Kafantaris' Liberal faction, and with the support of the representatives belonging to Andreas Michalakopoulos and Themistoklis Sofoulis, received the confidence of the Parliament, with 259 votes.

At the end of the vote, the speaker of the Parliament, Konstantinos Raktivan, announced to the people, who, gathered in and outside the Parliament, the dethronement of the Glücksburg dynasty and the establishment of the republic. The next day, 25 March 1924, 283 deputies ratified the Resolution on the Deposition of the Dynasty and the Proclamation of the Republic («Ψήφισμα περί εκπτώσεως της Δυναστείας και ανακηρύξεως της Δημοκρατίας»).

The resolution was approved by the Greek people in the referendum of 30 April 1924.

On 8 June 1924, Georgios Kondylis, followed by the ministers Georgios Roussos, Aristomenis Mitsotakis and Emmanouil Tsouderos, resigned from the government. Kondylis cited Papanastasiou's indifference to the action within the army of the pro-communist organization Veteran Soldiers Union; Tsouderos, because his recommendations on finances were rejected; Roussos was not excused; while Mitsotakis cited authoritarianism on the part of Papanastasiou and his disagreement with the bill "on exchange controls".

Papanastasiou reacted by reshuffling his cabinet, with the tacit support of Andreas Michalakopoulos. However, dissatisfaction was growing, and on 19 July 1924 the government lost Parliament's confidence and Papanastasiou resigned.

== Council of Ministers ==
| Office | Incumbent | Took office | Left office |
|---|---|---|---|
| Prime Minister | Alexandros Papanastasiou | 12 March 1924 | 24 July 1924 |
| Minister of Foreign Affairs | Alexandros Papanastasiou (interim) replaced by Georgios Roussos replaced by Konstantinos Rentis | 12 March; 31 March; 18 June | 31 March; 18 June; 24 July |
| Minister of Justice | Konstantinos Stamoulis | 12 March | 24 July |
| Minister of the Interior | Panayiotis Aravantinos | 12 March | 24 July |
| Minister for Religious Affairs and Public Education | Ioannis Liberopoulos | 12 March | 24 July |
| Minister of Finance | Alexandros Papanastasiou replaced by Emmanouil Tsouderos replaced by Konstantinos Gotsis | 12 March; 4 May; 14 June | 4 May; 14 June; 24 July |
| Minister of National Economy | Aristomenis Mitsotakis replaced by Georgios Douzinas | 12 March; 18 June | 18 June; 24 July |
| Minister of Public Transportation | Georgios Isaias | 12 March | 24 July |
| Minister of Agriculture and Public Estate | Anastasios Bakalbasis | 12 March | 24 July |
| Minister of Health, Welfare and Comprehension | Dimitrios Pazis | 12 March | 24 July |
| Minister of Public Order | Theodoros Pangalos replaced by Iosif Koundouros | 12 March; 18 June | 18 June; 24 July |
| Minister for Military Affairs | Georgios Kondylis replaced by Theodoros Pangalos | 12 March; 9 June | 9 June; 24 July |
| Minister of Naval Affairs | Alexandros Hatzikyriakos replaced by Alexandros Papanastasiou (interim) | 12 March; 9 June | 9 June; 24 July |
