= Papanastasiou =

Papanastasiou (Greek: Παπαναστασίου) is a surname, and may refer to:

- Alexandros Papanastasiou (1876–1936), Greek politician, sociologist and Prime Minister
- Andreas Papanastasiou (born 1987), Cypriot footballer
