= Alexandros Hatzikyriakos =

Greek Navy officer (1874–1956)

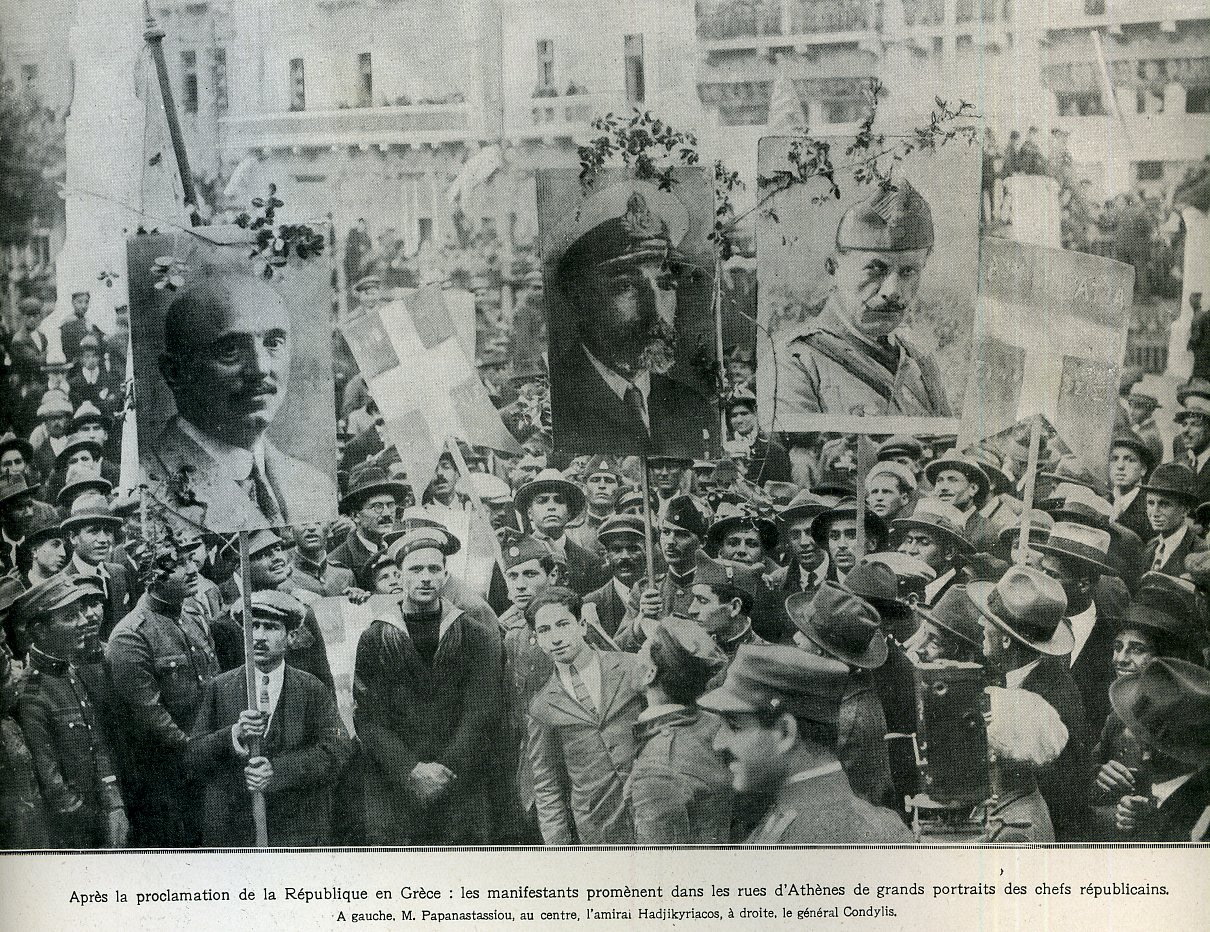
- Crowds celebrating in Athens the proclamation of the Republic in 1924, with placards of republican leaders Papanastasiou (left), Hatzikyriakos (center) and Kondylis (right)
- Born: 1 January 1874; Ermoupoli
- Died: 24 March 1956 (aged 82); Athens
- Relatives: Nikos Hatzikyriakos-Gikas
- Military career
- Allegiance: Kingdom of Greece
- Branch: Royal Hellenic Navy
- Service years: 1899–1924
- Rank: Rear Admiral
- Wars: Balkan Wars; World War I Greco-Turkish War of 1919–1922
- Other work: MP, Minister for Naval Affairs (thrice), briefly Foreign Minister (twice)

Alexandros Hatzikyriakos (Greek: Αλέξανδρος Χατζηκυριάκος; 1 January 1874 – 24 March 1956) was a Greek Navy officer who rose to the rank of rear admiral. He played a major role in the establishment of the Second Hellenic Republic in 1924, and served thrice as Minister for Naval Affairs and two brief periods as Foreign Minister.

== Life ==
He was born in Ermoupoli, on the island of Syros, on 1 January 1874 to an old shipping family from Psara. His father, Nikolaos, was an industrialist, while his brother Andreas became a politician. He entered the Hellenic Navy Academy, and was commissioned as an ensign in March 1899.

During the 1909 Goudi coup he took an active part as a member of the military revolutionary council. He fought in the Balkan Wars of 1912–13, first as captain of the destroyer Doxa, and then as battalion commander of the newly constituted naval infantry regiment (the future 29th Infantry Regiment) during the Second Balkan War (1913). In 1916 Hatzikyriakos joined the Provisional Government of National Defence under Eleftherios Venizelos, and was appointed as captain of the cruiser Georgios Averof, which he commanded during the Greek landing at Smyrna and the opening stages of the Greco-Turkish War of 1919–1922.

Following the Greek defeat in the war and the outbreak of the September 1922 Revolution, he became a member of the revolutionary committee and assumed the command of the entire Greek fleet in anticipation of resumption of hostilities with Turkey. Following the peace with Turkey (Treaty of Lausanne) he entered politics and was elected as a representative for Athens in the IV National Assembly, where he became a leading figure in the eventual abolition of the Greek monarchy and the establishment of the Second Hellenic Republic. He served as Minister for Naval Affairs in the Alexandros Papanastasiou cabinet (12 March 1924), until his resignation on 5 July 1924, after which he retired from active service with the rank of rear admiral.

Hatzikyriakos supported the June 1925 coup of general Theodoros Pangalos, and was appointed again as Minister for Naval Affairs in the new cabinet (serving also briefly as Foreign Minister during vacancies of the post in 26 June – 2 July and 26 October – 6 November) until his resignation on 8 January 1926. He served again as Minister for Naval Affairs in the 1933–35 Panagis Tsaldaris cabinet, resigning due to his failure to prevent the fleet's participation in the failed coup attempt on 1 March 1935. He then withdrew from public life, and died in Athens on 24 March 1956 at the age of 82.

Hatzikyriakos was married to Eleni Gika, and their son was the painter Nikos Hatzikyriakos-Gikas.

Political offices
Preceded by Ioannis Kanavos	Minister for Naval Affairs; 12 March – 5 July 1924	Succeeded by Alexandros Papanastasiou (pro tempore)
Preceded by Athanasios N. Miaoulis	Minister for Naval Affairs; 26 June 1925 – 8 January 1926	Succeeded by Nikolaos Botasis
Preceded by Andreas Michalakopoulos	Minister for Foreign Affairs (pro tempore); 26 June – 2 July 1925	Succeeded by Konstantinos Rendis
Preceded by Konstantinos Rendis	Minister for Foreign Affairs (pro tempore); 26 October – 6 November 1925	Succeeded by Loukas Kanakaris-Roufos
Preceded by Georgios Panas	Minister for Naval Affairs; 10 March 1933 – 2 March 1935	Succeeded by Sofoklis Dousmanis
