= Alexandros Papanastasiou =

Early 20th-century Greek lawyer and politician; Prime Minister in 1924 and 1932

- Αλέξανδρος Παπαναστασίου
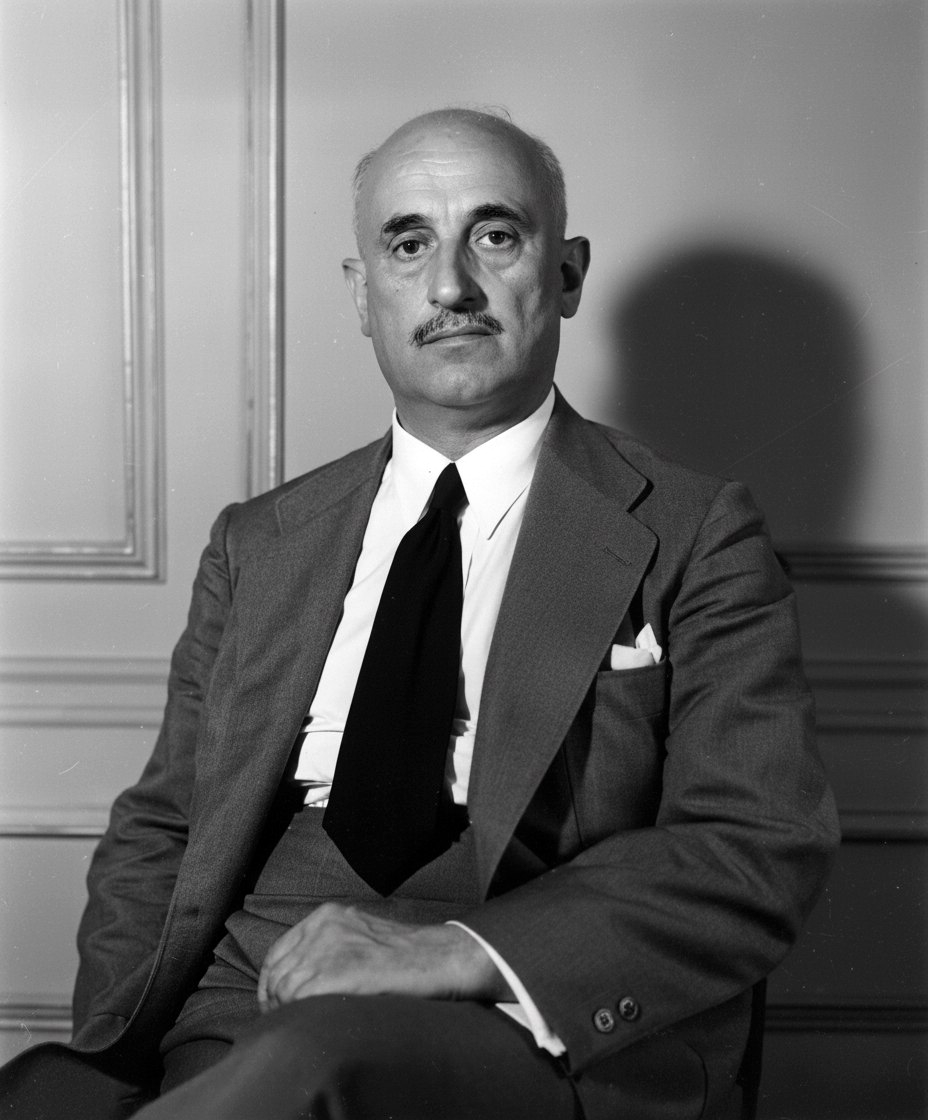
- Papanastasiou in 1935

Prime Minister of Greece
- In office 26 May 1932 – 5 June 1932
- President: Alexandros Zaimis
- Preceded by: Eleftherios Venizelos
- Succeeded by: Eleftherios Venizelos
- In office 12 March 1924 – 24 July 1924
- Monarch: George II (until Mar 1924)
- President: Pavlos Kountouriotis (from Mar 1924)
- Regent: Pavlos Kountouriotis (until Mar 1924)
- Preceded by: Georgios Kafantaris
- Succeeded by: Themistoklis Sofoulis

Personal details
- Born: 8 July 1876 Tripoli, Kingdom of Greece
- Died: 17 November 1936 (aged 60) Ekali, Kingdom of Greece
- Party: Liberal Party; Democratic Union; Agricultural and Labour Party
- Parent(s): Panagiotis Papanastasiou; Marigo Rogari-Apostolopoulou
- Education: University of Athens; Friedrich Wilhem University; University of London; University of Paris
- Occupation: Lawyer; Sociologist; Politician

Alexandros Papanastasiou (Greek: Αλέξανδρος Παπαναστασίου; 8 July 1876 – 17 November 1936) was a Greek lawyer, sociologist and politician who served twice as the prime minister of Greece during the interwar period. He was a pioneer in the establishment of the Second Hellenic Republic.

== Early years ==
Papanastasiou was born on 8 July 1876 in Tripoli to Panagiotis Papanastasiou and Marigo Rogari-Apostolopoulou. His father was a member of Parliament. He spent part of his childhood in Kalamata (1876–1883) and Piraeus (1883–1889). He studied law at the National and Kapodistrian University of Athens (1895–1898), earning his doctorate in 1899 and a licence in 1901. From 1901 to 1905 he studied social science, law and philosophy at the Friedrich Wilhelm University of Berlin and in Heidelberg. In 1905 he went to London and then to Paris, where he continued his studies until 1907, when he decided to return to Greece. In 1908, he founded the "Society of sociologists" with Alexandros Delmouzos. He tried to combine political activity with scientific research.

== Political career ==
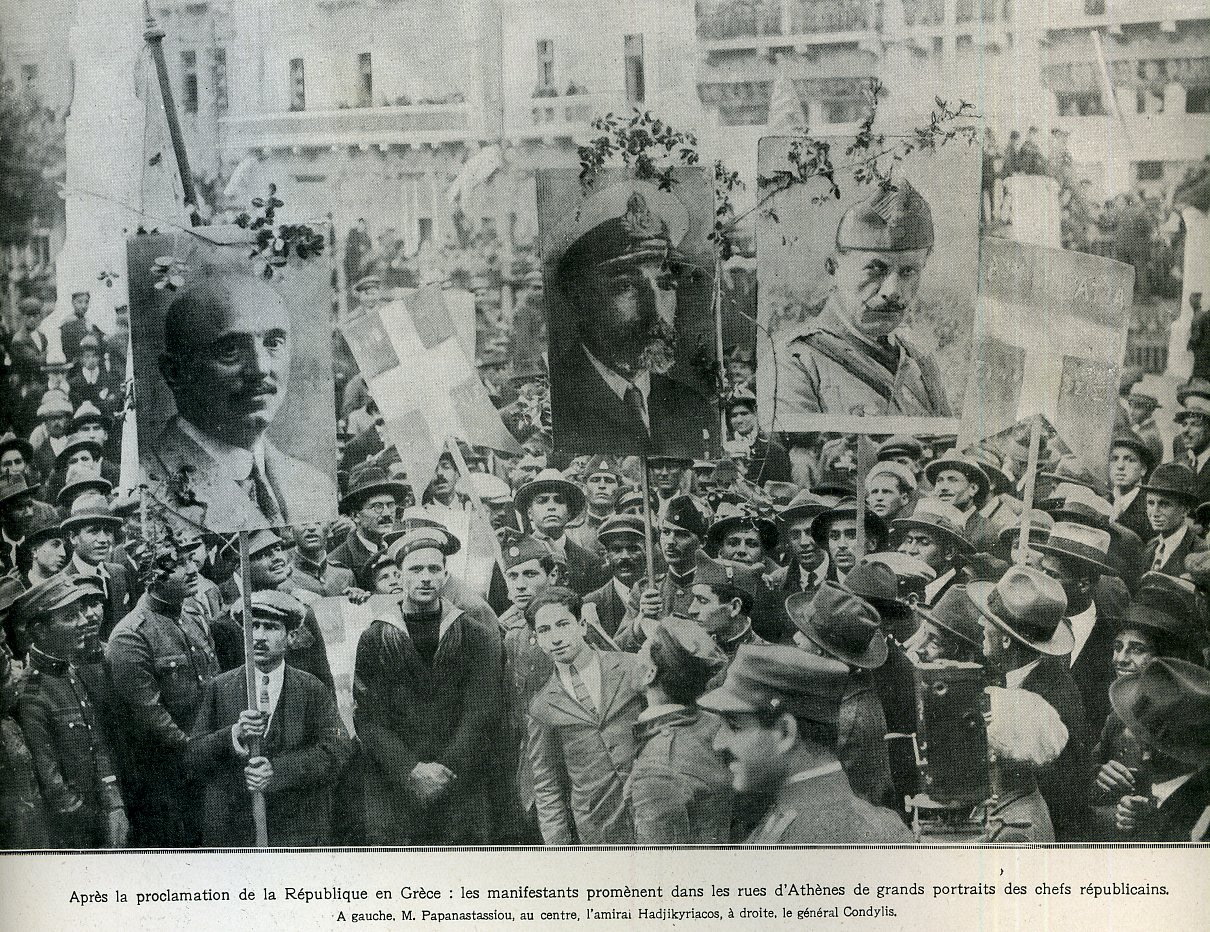
Proclamation of the Second Hellenic Republic, with crowds holding placards depicting Papanastasiou (left) and other republican leaders.

In 1910, Papanastasiou was elected for the first time to the Hellenic Parliament. He fought for agrarian reform in Thessaly seeking to break up the big farms that existed there since the rule of the Ottoman Empire and redistribute them to the local farmers. In 1916, he joined the Provisional Government of National Defence of Eleftherios Venizelos in Thessaloniki which sought to bring Greece at the side of the Allies of World War I. He was immediately rewarded with the governorship of the Ionian Islands.

After World War I, Papanastasiou took part in several Venizelos governments as Minister of Transportation, Minister of National Health and Interior Minister. When Venizelos lost the 1920 elections, he remained in Greece and criticised the People's Party governments under the successive Prime Ministers Dimitrios Rallis, Nikolaos Kalogeropoulos, Dimitrios Gounaris, Nikolaos Stratos and Petros Protopapadakis for their mishandling of the ongoing Greco-Turkish War of 1919–1922.

In 1921, along with others, he published a document entitled the Republican/Democratic Manifesto (Δημοκρατικό Μανιφέστο), which criticised the monarchy, warning for future destruction in the Asian Minor front and finally calling Constantine I to resign, so Greece to survive. He stated that Greece was "the creation of the spirit, labour and struggles of her children. It is not the property of Royalty and no part of Greece can be sacrificed for the sake of personal interests of her monarch." For the publication of this manifesto, Papanastasiou was imprisoned along with the other signatories after a trial. Georgios Papandreou was his defender.

When the People's Party government collapsed, following the Asia Minor Disaster, Papanastasiou formed a government which, at his insistence, on 25 March 1924, proclaimed a Republic. The issue was submitted to a plebiscite with the voters approving the abolition of the monarchy on 13 April 1924. During his term of office, Papanastasiou also made proposals for the establishment of the University of Thessaloniki, the recognition of the common, demotic Greek language, the establishment of adult education centres, etc.

From 1926 until 1928, he was Minister of Agriculture and was instrumental in the establishment of the Agricultural Bank of Greece. Papanastasiou briefly served as Prime Minister once more between May and June 1932. In 1936, he was placed under house arrest by the government of Ioannis Metaxas.

Papanastasiou died of a heart attack on 17 November 1936.

== Premiership ==
=== Cabinet of Alexandros Papanastasiou (1924) ===
Immediately after the resignation of Georgios Kafantaris, because of the pressure he was under for the immediate proclamation of the Republic and the refusal of Andreas Michalakopoulos to assume the office, the Regent gave the mandate to form a government to Alexandros Papapanastasiou, who accepted it. In his programmatic statements on 24 March, Papanastasiou, after stressed that the National Assembly had constitutional rights and jurisdiction to declare the Republic, he submitted a draft resolution declaring the fall of the dynasty and the proclamation of the Republic, which, however, had to but would later be approved by referendum. He also proposed the establishment of the Senate, a second legislative body, through which he aimed to improve of legislative and constitutional work. He also proposed introduction of the proportional electoral system.

== Bibliography ==
- Αλέξανδρος Παπαναστασίου: Θεσμοί, Ιδεολογία και Πολιτική στο Μεσοπόλεμο. Πολύτυπο, Αθήνα 1987 (συλλογικός τόμος, πρακτικά συνεδρίου).

== Sources ==
- Georg Veloudis, "Papanastasiu, Alexandros", in Biographisches Lexikon zur Geschichte Südosteuropas. Vol. 3. Munich 1979, pp. 391–393.

Political offices
Preceded by Georgios Kaphantaris	Prime Minister of Greece; 12 March 1924 – 24 July 1924	Succeeded by Themistoklis Sophoulis
Preceded by Eleftherios Venizelos	Prime Minister of Greece; May 26, 1932 – June 5, 1932	Succeeded by Eleftherios Venizelos
