= 1922 in Greece =

- Decades: 1900s; 1910s; 1920s; 1930s; 1940s
- See also: Other events of 1922; List of years in Greece

The year 1922 was a very important year in the history of modern Greece. It witnessed the fall of ideas birthed by Hellenism ever since the first days of its struggle for independence. The centenary of which had just been celebrated; more particularly of the idea of a greater Greece, which the name of Eleftherios Venizelos has been so closely associated ever since his first call to power in 1910. From a Balkan power of dominant magnitude, Greece was thrown back into the unenviable position it occupied after the Greco-Turkish War of 1897.

== Incumbents ==
- Monarch:
  - Constantine I (until September 27)
  - George II (starting September 27)
- Prime Minister:
  - Until May 16: Dimitrios Gounaris
  - May 16 - May 22: Nikolaos Stratos
  - May 22 - September 10: Nikolaos Triantaphyllakos
  - September 10 - September 29: Anastasios Charalambis
  - September 30 - November 27: Sotirios Krokidas
  - Beginning November 27: Stylianos Gonatas

== Continued Strife ==
The first months of 1922 were marked by the continuation of the strife between King Constantinists and Venizelists. This found its most notable expression in a controversy between the Athenian government and the Phanar of Constantinople in connection with the election in December 1921 of Mgr. Meletios Metaxakis, an ardent supporter of Venizelos, as ecumenical patriarch. Athens refused to recognize Mgr. Metaxakis as spiritual head of the church in Greece proper, and the synodical court in Athens, going as far as to condemn him to be deprived of his ecclesiastical rank and interned in the Monastery of Zante.

== Negotiations for Peace ==
In the meantime the efforts of the Allies to negotiate a peace settlement between Greece and the Turkish Nationalists which had been commenced in the previous year were continued. A meeting of British, French, and Italian statesmen to discuss Near Eastern affairs and the revision of the Sèvres Treaty was unofficially announced to take place early in February, but was postponed. On March 22, however, a conference of Allied foreign ministers consisting of Raymond Poincaré, Lord Curzon of Kedleston, and Carlo Schanzer was opened in Paris, and one of its first steps was to propose to the Greeks and Turks a three month long armistice in Asia Minor together with the establishment of a neutral zone between the warring armies, pending negotiations for the conclusion of peace. At the same time it advocated the evacuation of the whole of Asia Minor by the Greeks, the establishment of a special regime for the Smyrna area, and the placing of racial minorities under the protection of the League of Nations. It further drew up plans for the demilitarization of the Straits and a rectification of the Turkish-Greek frontier in Eastern Thrace between the neighbourhood of Ganos on the Sea of Marmora and a point on the Bulgarian frontier in the western part of the Stranja mountains, leaving Rodosto to the Turks and placing Baba-Eske and Kirk Kilisse on the Greek side of the border, Greece thus retaining Adrianople. The Angora government expressed its readiness to enter into an armistice on condition that Smyrna should be immediately evacuated by the Greeks, and that the evacuation of Asia Minor should be completed within four months. The Greek government, while nominally accepting the Allied proposals, made hasty preparations for the formation, under the auspices of the Greek military leaders, of a special "Government of Ionia" (hinterland of Smyrna) on the same general lines as the Angora Nationalist government, while simultaneously an organization of Greeks resident abroad, consisting mainly of Venizelist elements and calling itself the "League for National Defense", issued an appeal to Greeks all over the world to oppose the evacuation of Asia Minor by the Greek army. Meanwhile, no attempt was made to carry out the Allied proposals in practice, and for nearly three months the situation in Asia Minor remained in suspense, no official armistice being concluded, while at the same time active hostilities on the front were limited to small skirmishes between the outposts of the two armies.

== Internal Situation ==
The internal situation during the spring and early summer of 1922 also remained more or less stationary, except for a series of minor cabinet crises. Dimitrios Gounaris resigned in March, and was succeeded by Nikolaos Stratos, a moderate royalist, who, however, gave place once more to Gounaris. The latter in his turn resigned for a second time on May 12, and was again succeeded by Stratos, who after holding the premiership for a short time, made way for a coalition cabinet under Petros Protopapadakis, which included among its members both Stratos and Gounaris.

== Attempted Peace ==
Undaunted by the failure of the Paris conference, the French government made another attempt to bring Turkey and Greece to terms in the earlier part of July, when it put forward a proposal for the holding of a preliminary meeting of Turkish and Greek representatives in the presence of Allied commissioners. The Greek government, however, informed the Allies that Greece, after having in vain shown every disposition to facilitate a solution of the Eastern problem, would now reserve liberty of action and seek some direct solution. This announcement was followed by a note handed to the Allies on July 29, in which the Greek government declared its intention of occupying Constantinople with Greek troops, and thus forcing the Turks to conclude peace. This last note was duly followed by the landing of 25,000 Greek troops at Rodosto and corresponding military preparations for the carrying out of the proposed coup, according to a plan elaborated by General Hatzianestis, who had succeeded General Papoulas as commander-in-chief of the Greek armies. On being warned by the British government of the serious consequences that would follow such a step, the Greek minister of foreign affairs gave a positive assurance that on no account would Greece occupy Constantinople without Allied sanction, which was, as a matter of fact, refused.

Speaking in the House of Commons on the Near Eastern situation on August 4, David Lloyd George strongly supported Greek claims to Asia Minor and Eastern Thrace, and paid a glowing tribute to Greek arms. Excerpts from the British premier's speech were published in a Greek army order of the day and distributed among the Greek troops in Asia Minor. Having failed to carry out the Constantinople coup, King Constantine's government once more reverted to the plan for the proclamation of an independent Ionia. At the same time a last attempt was made by the Allies to convoke a Near East conference (this time to be held in Venice, in September) of representatives of the Great Powers and the two belligerents to discuss terms of peace. Before, however, these steps could lead to any result, military events supervened, which entirely transformed the situation.

== Commencement of General Offensive ==
On August 26, the Turkish Nationalist forces under the command of Mustafa Kemal Pasha attacked the Greek lines south and northeast of Afium-Karahissar. The operations gradually developed into a general offensive against the Greek forces, which were compelled two days later to evacuate the place. The loss of this key position was swiftly followed by the retreat of the Greek forces from Eskişehir and other important posts, and in less than a fortnight what had from the first been a somewhat serious reverse to Greek arms developed into a debacle of unexpected magnitude, which left the Greek government no alternative but to order the immediate withdrawal of the army from Asia Minor and to address an appeal to the Allies to intervene with the object of procuring a cessation of hostilities. The Turks refused an armistice, and the Greek army was forced to embark while still being pursued by the victorious enemy, who entered Smyrna on September 9. Thousands of Greek refugees streamed to the coast from all parts of Anatolia, fleeing from the revenge of the Turks. The total number transported to various parts of Greece with the assistance of the Greek authorities and the Allies amounted to nearly 1,000,000.

== Government Crisis ==
The Greek debacle in Asia Minor was naturally followed by a government crisis in Greece proper. The cabinet resigned on September 8, and Nikolaos Kalogeropoulos was entrusted by the king with the formation of a new ministry. After two days spent in negotiations he failed in his task, and Nikolaos Triantaphyllakos, the ex-high commissioner of Greece at Constantinople, was summoned, and succeeded with difficulty in forming a makeshift government. In the meantime, excitement and dissatisfaction were steadily growing among the population, and strict measures were necessary for the maintenance of order. On September 26, martial law was proclaimed, following the revolt in Salonika of 8,000 troops and their officers, who sent word to Athens demanding the abdication of King Constantine I and the imprisonment of the former prime ministers, Gounaris and Stratos. This revolt was followed by that of troops stationed in the islands of Mytilene, Chios, and Crete. The army contingents in Mytilene formed a Revolutionary Committee headed by Colonel Stylianos Gonatas, which dispatched by aeroplane the following demands to Athens: the dismissal of the government, the dissolution of the Chamber, the holding of new elections, and the abdication of King Constantine I in favor of the crown prince. The revolutionary movement swiftly spread to other centers of old and new Greece and to the Greek gunboats stationed at Mytilene and in and about the port of Piraeus. The cabinet immediately resigned, and on September 27 King Constantine I abdicated for the second time in the course of his career, and the crown prince succeeded to the throne of Greece as King George II.

== Revolutionary Committee ==
On September 28, the revolutionary troops, headed by their leaders, Colonel Plastiras and Colonel Gonatas, entered Athens amidst wild scenes of enthusiasm. One of the first steps taken by the Revolutionary Committee, which immediately took over the governancy of the country, was to order the expulsion from Greece of King Constantine and Queen Sofia and of the Princes Andrew and Nicholas, the ex-king's brothers, and to arrest all prominent premiers, politicians, and military and naval leaders of the Constantinist faction, such as Gounaris, Stratos, Protopapadakis, and Theotokis, Admiral Goudas, General Papoulas, etc. A telegram was dispatched by the Revolutionary Committee to Venizelos in Paris requesting him to collaborate with the new government in the attempt to rescue Greece from the catastrophe in which she had been involved by King Constantine and his advisers, and a new cabinet was formed with Alexandros Zaimis, as premier, and Nikolaos Sokrates Politis, as foreign minister – both Venizelists. Venizelos, in his reply, intimated that for the time being he would confine himself merely to representing his country's interests abroad, and refused any actual participation in the new government. On September 30 ex-King Constantine, ex-Queen Sofia, and Prince Nicholas, with other members of the royal family, left Greece for Italy, the ex-King never to return.

== Negotiations ==
On October 3, negotiations were opened at Mudania in Asia Minor between representatives of the Nationalist Turkish government on the one hand and the Allies and Greece on the other for the conclusion of an armistice. After serious division of opinion which nearly led to a complete breakdown, terms were finally signed on October 10. The Turks undertook to respect neutral zones on the European and Asiatic sides of the Straits, while the Allies guaranteed the evacuation of Eastern Thrace by the Greek army within fifteen days of the signing of the convention, the Greek troops to be replaced provisionally by Allied forces not exceeding seven battalions in total strength. The demarcation line between Greek Western Thrace and the part of Eastern Thrace reverting to Turkey in virtue of the armistice convention was fixed along the left bank of the Maritza from its outlet into Aegean Sea to the point where it crosses the frontier of Thrace into Bulgaria. The new conditions in the Near East created by the Greek debacle led the Italian government to proclaim the denunciation of Italo-Greek agreement of May 17, 1920, which provided for a settlement of the differences that had arisen between Greece and Italy regarding the Dodecanese Islands, a step which called forth a protest from the government of the United Kingdom.

== Inquiry ==
The inquiry into the causes of the Greek military debacle in Asia Minor and the search for its authors instituted by the Revolutionary Committee on its advent to power resulted in a number of new arrests of leading personalities. Thus, towards the end of October, the ex-king's brother, Prince Andrew, was arrested at Corfu on the charge of having disobeyed the orders of his military chiefs while commanding an army corps on the front. Kalogeropoulos, ex-premier, Valtatzis, ex-foreign minister, General Hatzianestis, ex-commander-in-chief, and others were also subsequently charged with high treason and imprisoned. On November 20, a conference of representatives of the Allies, Turkey, and Greece was opened at Lausanne for the purpose of the revision of the Sèvres Treaty and the final settlement of the Near Eastern problem. At the opening stages of the conference, Greece was represented by Venizelos.

== New Government ==
Little was heard of Greek internal affairs in the meantime, the attention of the whole nation being centered on Venizelos' efforts abroad to procure a settlement which should be as painless as possible for his country. The first cabinet formed under the regime of the Revolutionary Committee (which had established itself as the real master of Greece with King George II merely as a figurehead) underwent several slight changes, the chief of which was caused by the refusal of Zaimis to retain the premiership (which remained vacant, with Sotirios Krokidas as acting premier), and after having been in power for less than two months resigned on November 24, chiefly owing to internal differences arising from the trial of the ex-ministers, statesmen, and military leaders by a revolutionary tribunal on the charges of high treason. The British government, through its minister in Athens, Lindley, urged that the accused should be treated leniently. While certain members of the cabinet were prepared to accept the British suggestion, the more irreconcilable elements refused to submit to what they considered as foreign intervention in Greek internal affairs, and the cabinet accordingly resigned, and was replaced by one composed exclusively of members of the Revolutionary Committee and of the republican group which formed the committee's most active supporters. Colonel Gonatas, one of the leaders of the Revolutionary Committee, was appointed premier, and Konstantinos Rentis, one of the leaders of the republican group, as acting minister for foreign affairs. On November 27 the trial by the revolutionary court martial of the ex-ministers and military leaders was concluded. Six of the accused – Gounaris, Theotokis, Valtatzis, Stratos, Protopapadakis, and General Hatzianestis – were sentenced to death and executed the next morning, while Admiral Goudas and General Stratigos were sentenced to imprisonment for life. Following the execution of Gounaris and his companions the British government instructed the British minister at Athens to ask for his passports and leave Greece; nor had diplomatic relations between the two countries been renewed by the end of the year. Shortly after the execution of the six ministers the ex-king's brother Prince Andrew was tried by the same tribunal and sentenced to banishment for life from Greece. The prince and his family left Greece on December 4 for London.

== End of the Year ==
Thus the year 1922 closed for Greece in the most inauspicious circumstances with the question of a peace settlement which should enable the country to devote its forces to peaceful reconstruction still in abeyance, and internal dissatisfaction and unrest steadily increasing. One marked result of this discontent was a noticeable growth of republican sentiment which seemed to be paving the way for important developments in the near future.
