= September 1922 =

Month of 1922

<<	September 1922					>>
Su	Mo	Tu	We	Th	Fr	Sa
					1	2
3	4	5	6	7	8	9
10	11	12	13	14	15	16
17	18	19	20	21	22	23
24	25	26	27	28	29	30

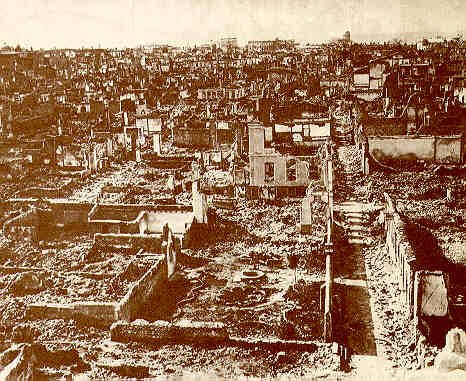
September 13, 1922: Turkish Army burns down the city of Smyrna, recently recaptured from Greece, and massacres non-Turkish residents

The following events occurred in September 1922:

== September 1, 1922 (Friday) ==
- The Reichsbank in Germany was closed by police following a bank run by employers looking to meet overdue payrolls.
- The Palestine Order in Council was put into effect by publication, providing for the British Mandate in what is now Israel and Palestine, to be governed by a British High Commissioner and an elected Legislative Council and to have a civil and religious court system.
- Born:
  - Yvonne De Carlo, Canadian-born American actress known for her role in The Munsters; as Margaret Yvonne Middleton, in Vancouver, British Columbia (d. 2007)
  - Vittorio Gassman, Italian actor and director; as Vittorio Gassman, in Genoa, Kingdom of Italy (present-day Italy) (d. 2000)
- Died: Princess Helena of Waldeck and Pyrmont, 61, member of the British royal family, died of a heart attack. (b. 1861)

== September 2, 1922 (Saturday) ==
- An agreement to end the nationwide anthracite coal mining strike in the United States was reached between the United Mine Workers of America and the Policy Committee of the Anthracite Coal Operators, by extending the terms of the contract between labor and management to at least August 31, 1923. The compromise came after the intervention of U.S. President Harding, who had appealed to both sides "in the name of public welfare" to accept the proposal to end the strike in time for the onset of winter, as made by the two U.S. Senators for Pennsylvania, David A. Reed and George W. Pepper, both of whom had been in office for less than a year.
- German President Friedrich Ebert declared the "Deutschlandlied" to be the national anthem of Germany. The lyrics were limited to the song's third stanza ("Einigkeit und Recht und Freiheit, Für das deutsche Vaterland!"). The song would be used in Nazi Germany (with the words of the more militant first stanza, "Deutschland, Deutschland über alles, Über alles in der Welt,") until the fall of the Third Reich in 1945. The "Deutschlandlied" would be made the anthem of West Germany on May 2, 1952 and continued after the reunification of Germany in 1989.

== September 3, 1922 (Sunday) ==
- The Austrian government issued a decree forbidding, except in the city of Vienna, the sale of alcohol in restaurants after 10 p.m., and in bars after midnight. Newspapers called it a first step towards prohibition.
- Born:
  - Steffan Danielsen, Faroese painter; as Johan Steffan Danielsen, in Nólsoy, Faroe Islands, Denmark (d. 1976)
  - Salli Terri, Canadian singer; in London, Ontario (d. 1996)
- Died: Agathe Whitehead von Trapp, 31, British-Austrian heiress and mother of the seven children who would become the Trapp Family singers and were the subject of the musical The Sound of Music, died from scarlet fever (b. 1891)

== September 4, 1922 (Monday) ==
- Jimmy Doolittle began the first single-day crossing of the United States, departing at 10:03 p.m. in a modified DH-4B from Pablo Beach, Florida toward Rockwell Field in San Diego, California.
- John Hessin Clarke, an Associate Justice of the United States Supreme Court, announced his resignation, to take effect on September 18, his 65th birthday. Clarke had only been on the Court for six years, and friends said that he would work toward bringing the United States into the League of Nations.
- Born: Margaret S. Collins, African-American entomologist known for her expertise in the study of termites; in Institute, West Virginia (d. 1996)
- Died:
  - Pratap Singh, 76, Maharaja of the princely state of Idar and regent of Jodhpur State, decorated hero of the British Indian Army (b. 1845)
  - James Young, 40, Scottish footballer, was killed in a motorcycle accident. (b. 1882)

== September 5, 1922 (Tuesday) ==
- A mine explosion in England at the Haig Colliery in Whitehaven, Cumbria, killed 39 miners.
- In a telegram to prime minister Rauf Orbay, Turkey's President Mustafa Kemal Atatürk asserted the Turkish claim to East Thrace (Trakya) as part of its conditions of the settlement of the war with Greece, to take back territory that had been ceded to Greece in 1920. The areas that came back under Turkish control under the 1923 Treaty of Lausanne would include Edirne (Adrianople) and İzmir (Smyrna).
- Born: Denys Wilkinson, British nuclear physicist and inventor, known for the Wilkinson ADC (analog-to-digital converter); in Leeds, West Yorkshire (d. 2016)
- Died: Sarah Winchester, 83, American heiress and the wealthiest woman in the world at the time of her death, known for being the majority owner of the Winchester firearms company, and as builder of the Winchester Mystery House, died in San Jose, California. (b. 1839)

== September 6, 1922 (Wednesday) ==
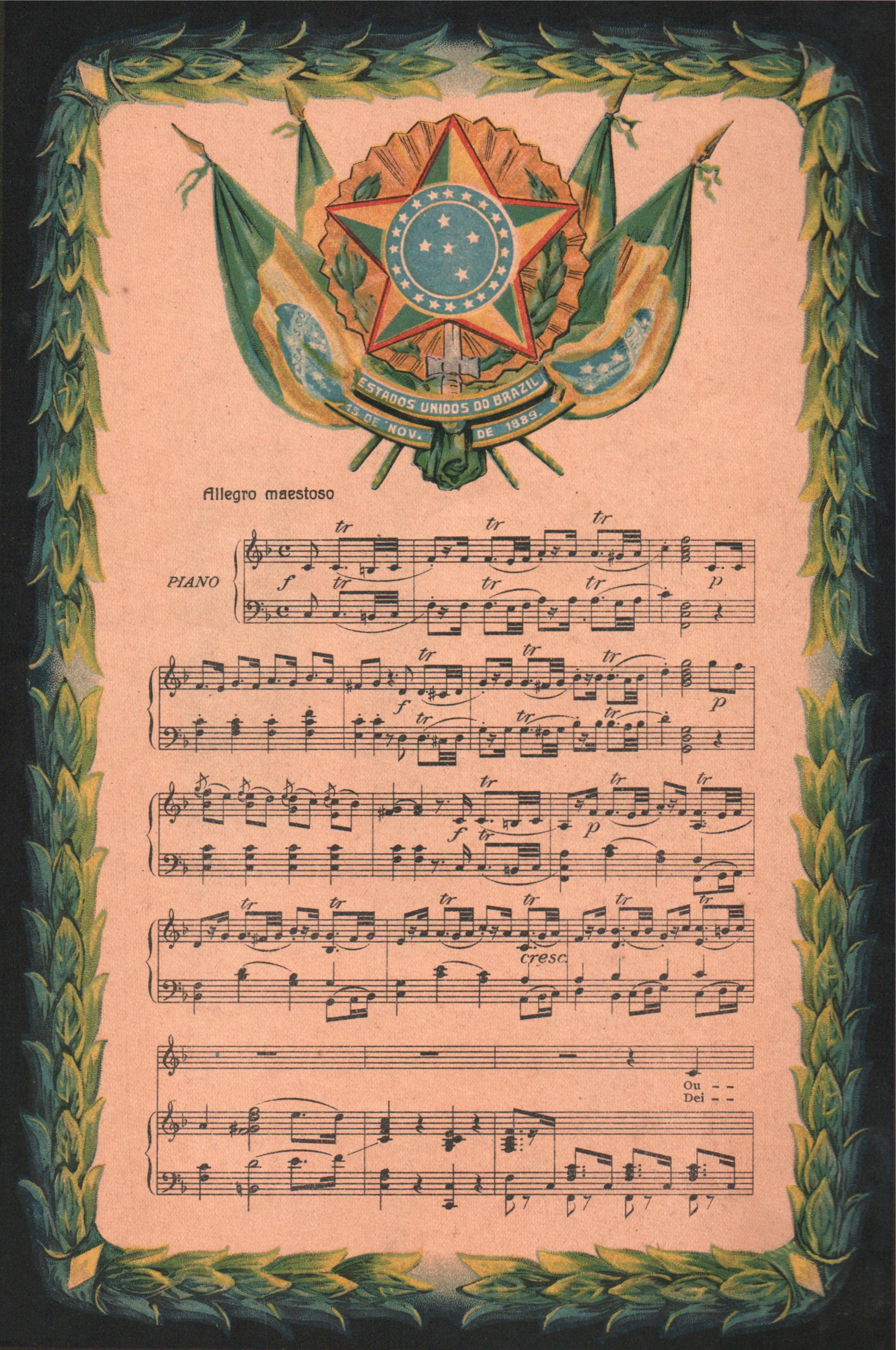
Himno Nacional Brasileiro

- A new law went into effect in Poland as part of an effort to stop the spread of venereal diseases, amending the Basic Sanitation Law to regulate houses of prostitution.
- The Hawaii Theatre opened in downtown Honolulu.

== September 7, 1922 (Thursday) ==
- Brazil celebrated its 100th birthday with a twenty-one gun salute at midnight and parading in the streets of Rio de Janeiro throughout the day.
- Man Singh II, the 10-year-old adopted son of Madho Singh II, became the Maharaja of Jaipur upon Madho II's death. He would retain the honorary title after India's independence in 1947 and would receive a pension until his death in 1970.
- Born:
  - Paulo Autran, Brazilian film and stage actor; in Rio de Janeiro (d. 2007)
  - David Croft, English writer, producer and director; as David Sharland, in Sandbanks, Dorset (d. 2011)
- Died:
  - William S. Halsted, 69, pioneering American surgeon, inventor of the residency training system within hospitals for medical school graduates, developed the radical mastectomy for treatment of breast cancer, and co-founder of the Johns Hopkins Hospital, died from bronchopneumonia. (b. 1852)
  - Charles Morris, 88, American historian and writer of historical textbooks (b. 1833)

== September 8, 1922 (Friday) ==
- The Greek Army began to evacuate Smyrna and asked Turkey for an armistice in the Greco-Turkish War.
- Mary Katherine Campbell of Columbus, Ohio won the second annual Miss America pageant, competing as one of 58 "intercity" contestants in Atlantic City, New Jersey, and in the process, "triumphing over more than 500 amateur and professional rivals." Under the rules of the competition, the winners of the three classes of competitors (intercity, amateur and professional beauties) went up against the reigning Miss America, Margaret Gorman, and the judges picked the winner from the four finalists. Campbell, who had won the intercity competition as "Miss Columbus", was selected as the winner of $5,000 and the Golden Mermaid Trophy.
- Born:
  - Sid Caesar, American comic actor and writer; as Isaac Sidney Caesar, in Yonkers, New York (d. 2014)
  - Lyndon LaRouche, American political activist; in Rochester, New Hampshire (d. 2019)

== September 9, 1922 (Saturday) ==
- Victorious Turkish forces entered Smyrna, effectively ending the Greco-Turkish War in the field.
- The Dáil Éireann, the Irish parliament elected in June, met for the first time after a number of delays. Anti-Treaty deputies did not attend with the exception of Laurence Ginnell who was soon ejected. W. T. Cosgrave was elected President of Dáil Éireann.
- The popular operetta Madame Pompadour, composed by Leo Fall with a libretto by Rudolph Schanzer and Ernst Welisch, was given its first performance, making a debut at the Berliner Theater in Berlin in the German language, with the symphony conducted by Leo Fall. The opera was subsequently translated into English, Italian and French.
- At least 30 people, all women and children who were passengers on the German steamship Hammonia, died when the two lifeboats that they were in overturned, after they safely evacuated the ship as it foundered off the coast of Spain. The passenger list went down with the ship, but the ship captain believed that there were 365 passengers and 192 crew for a total of 537 people on board. Another steamship, Kinfauns Castle, rescued 383 survivors and its captain said that he witnessed 80 people drowning, while other observers put the number of dead as high as 150.
- The Gormanston Camp for captured Irish Republicans was opened at the site of a former Royal Irish Constabulary base, and housed over 1,000 prisoners at its height, finally closing at the end of 1923.
- Born:
  - Hans Georg Dehmelt, German physicist and awarded the Nobel Prize in Physics in 1989; in Görlitz, Germany (d. 2017)
  - Warwick Estevam Kerr, Brazilian geneticist known for his breeding of the Africanized bee, colloquially known as the "killer bee"; in Santana de Parnaíba, São Paulo, Brazil (d. 2018)
  - Sir Tom Cowie, English businessman, founder of the Arriva Group; in Sunderland, County Durham (d. 2012)
  - Pauline Baynes, English book illustrator; in Hove, Sussex (d. 2008)
  - Manolis Glezos, Greek politician and writer; in Apeiranthos, Naxos, Kingdom of Greece (d. 2020)
- Died: Annie Royle Taylor, 66, English explorer and evangelist missionary who was the first Western woman to visit Tibet. (b. 1855)

== September 10, 1922 (Sunday) ==
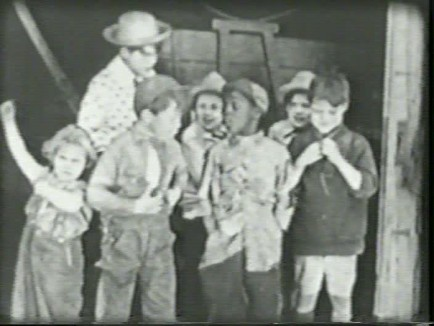
A scene from One Terrible Day

- Film producer Hal Roach introduced the first of 220 short films in the Our Gang series, as the Pathé company released the silent 20-minute feature "One Terrible Day", directed by Robert F. McGowan and Tom McNamara. The series of movies about the adventures of a gang of children, was shown before feature films and continued until 1944, and then was syndicated on television from 1955 onward as The Little Rascals.
- The New York World published an interview by Clare Sheridan with English writer Rudyard Kipling in which he was quoted as saying that America had come into the war "two years, seven months and four days too late" and had "quit the day of the Armistice, without waiting to see the thing through." Kipling believed he had made the remarks in the context of a private conversation and so in the media uproar that ensued he publicly denied ever giving Sheridan an interview at all.
- The New York Yankees played their last regular season games in the Polo Grounds before moving to Yankee Stadium for 1923. The Yanks swept a doubleheader against the Philadelphia Athletics in front of a capacity crowd, as an estimated 25,000 fans had to be turned away at the gate.

== September 11, 1922 (Monday) ==
- The British Mandate of Palestine began as the oath of office for the High Commissioner of Palestine was administered to Sir Herbert Samuel, as well as to the Commander in Chief of British forces there. The ceremony took place in Jerusalem in the presence of Lord Allenby, the British Army Field marshal who liberated Palestine from the Ottoman Empire, and by the Emir Abdullah of Jordan.
- Allied troops landed at Çanakkale and set up a neutral zone between Greece and Turkey.
- Turkish troops who had taken over the Smyrna Province from Greece carried out a massacre of Armenian residents under the direction of the new Turkish Governor, Nureddin Pasha, according to a statement made afterwards by a British eyewitness who had been able to flee the area. Businessman Roy Treloar said that Nureddin "commenced a systematic hunting down of Armenians, who were gathered in batches of 100, taken to Konak and murdered."
- The former Prime Minister of Greece, Eleftherios Venizelos, announced from Paris that he would form a government only if King Constantine abdicated and if Prime Minister Nikolaos Triantaphyllakos and his government resigned. Although the "September 11 Revolution" in Greece is sometimes mistakenly listed as having happened on this day, Greece at the time was still operating under the Julian calendar, and the revolution took place on 24th September according to the Gregorian calendar recognized by the rest of the world.
- Hoping to prevent a split within the Communist Party leadership in the Soviet Union, Vladimir Lenin proposed that Leon Trotsky, alongside Lev Kamenev, would become Lenin's deputy on Sovnarkom, the Council of People's Commissars. Trotsky declined to accept the invitation.
- One of the predecessors of Melbourne, Australia’s Herald Sun newspaper, The Sun News-Pictorial, was launched by Hugh Dennison as "a morning tabloid with a light touch and heavy with photographs." publication. It would merge with The Herald, effective October 8, 1990.
- The Treaty of Kars was ratified in Yerevan, setting the boundary between Turkey and the Armenian Soviet Socialist Republic and the Georgian Soviet Socialist Republic, which would continue as the Turkish-Soviet boundary afterward.

== September 12, 1922 (Tuesday) ==
- The House of Bishops of the Episcopal Church in the United States voted to alter the Book of Common Prayer language for wedding vows to no longer require the bride to agree to "obey" her husband. The decision to revise the Common Prayer treatise was approved at the meeting in Portland, Oregon by a vote of 36 to 27.
- Paavo Nurmi of Finland broke his own world record in the men's 5000 metres running event with a time of 14 minutes 35.4 seconds.
- Pola Negri (stage name for Apolonia Chalupec), signed by Paramount Pictures after having been a star for Germany's UFA studios, arrived in the United States on the liner Majestic as the first film actress from continental Europe to be promoted in the U.S.
- Ascension Island unified politically with the island of Saint Helena, 800 miles (1,300 km) away, as a single British overseas territory in the southern Atlantic Ocean.
- IRA forces took Ballina, County Mayo.
- Born:
  - Hiroshi Enatsu, Japanese theoretical physicist; in Miyakonojō, Miyazaki Prefecture (d. 2019)
  - Mark Rosenzweig, American research psychologist; in Rochester, New York (d. 2009)
  - Jackson Mac Low, American poet; in Chicago (d. 2004)

== September 13, 1922 (Wednesday) ==
- A fire killed more than 10,000 people in the port city of Smyrna (now İzmir), which had been recaptured from Greece four days earlier by Turkish troops to end the Greco-Turkish War. According to contemporary accounts from witnesses evacuated from the area, Turkish troops set multiple fires to the Basmane neighborhood in the Armenian quarter of the city, and the fire was spread by windy weather.
- The highest weather temperature ever recorded on Earth, 58.0 °C (136.4 °F), was measured at El Azizia in Libya near Tripoli, breaking the record of 56.7 °C (134.1 °F) that had been recorded in Death Valley in the United States on July 10, 1913. The record would stand until 2012, when the World Meteorological Organization reviewed the data and concluded that the 58-degree centigrade reading had been taken by an inexperienced observer who had recorded a temperature seven degrees hotter than nearby areas.
- The nationwide railroad strike in the U.S. began to wind down as about one-third of the country's railways reached an agreement with the shopmen. The agreement meant the restoration of service for at least 30 of the 202 Class 1 railroad lines including the New York Central Railroad, the Chicago, Milwaukee and St. Paul Railroad, the Chicago, Rock Island and Pacific Railroad, the Baltimore and Ohio Railroad, the Seaboard Air Line Railroad, and the Norfolk and Western Railway.
- France and Poland signed a ten-year military convention pledging to defend each other in the event of an attack.
- The "Straw Hat Riot" broke out in New York City after a gang of youths in Manhattan assaulted dockworkers who were still wearing straw hats after Labor Day. The tradition in the U.S. at the time had not only been to switch from straw hats to felt hats in the autumn, but to knock the hats off of the heads of people who failed to make the switch. Publicity about the incident led to copycat attacks by other gangs over the next several days.
- Born: Yma Sumac, Peruvian-American singer, actress, and model; as Zoila Emperatriz Chávarri Castillo, in Callao, Peru (d. 2008)

== September 14, 1922 (Thursday) ==
- The Argentine Polo Association (Asociación Argentina de Polo or AAP), the governing body for one of the most popular sports in Argentina, was founded in Buenos Aires, with the goal of creating a national team for international competitions.
- IRA forces overran the National Army garrison at Drumshanbo.
- Johnny Buff (ring name for John Lisky), holder of the American flyweight boxing championship in a weight class with no world title, lost the U.S. title to Filipino challenger Pancho Villa (Francisco Villaruel) at Ebbets Field in New York City.
- The historical film When Knighthood Was in Flower premiered at the Criterion Theatre in New York City.

== September 15, 1922 (Friday) ==
- The Chanak Crisis began as the British government threatened Turkey with war as Turkish forces approached the neutral zone at Çanakkale. Britain also appealed to the British Dominions to lend their assistance.
- The Lord Chief Justice of Ireland and two associates upheld the suspension of habeas corpus in the country due to the state of war and denied an application to free 5,000 prisoners held by the military.
- On the same day, J. William Billes and Alfred J. Billes invested their combined savings to purchase Hamilton Tire and Garage Ltd. for the purpose of selling tires at a discount by buying at low cost during the winter and marking up the prices to sell at a profit in the summer. The company would be rebranded as Canadian Tire Corporation Ltd. in 1927.
- The Council on Foreign Relations, based in the U.S., began publication of its bimonthly magazine, Foreign Affairs: An American Quarterly Review, with Volume 1, Number 1 dated September 15, 1922. The first article, after Archibald Cary Coolidge's editorial statement, was "A Requisite for the Success of Popular Diplomacy", by former U.S. Secretary of State Elihu Root.
- German Chancellor Joseph Wirth declared "Bread first, reparations second."
- The Turkish Orthodox Church, a denomination for the minority Christian population in the predominantly Muslim nation of Turkey, was founded in Kayseri as nationalist denomination that conducted services in the Turkish language and provided for the continuation of the Christian faith. Pavlos Karahisarithis, a Turkish bishop, became the first patriarch of the denomination, which was not recognized within the worldwide Orthodox Christian organization, and took the regnal name of Papa Eftim I.
- Born:
  - Jackie Cooper, American actor and director; as John Cooper Jr., in Los Angeles (d. 2011)
  - Vasil Laçi, Albanian independence activist who attempted to kill King Victor Emmanuel III of Italy during the Italian occupation of Albania; in Piqeras (d. executed 1941)
  - Gaetano Cozzi, Italian historian; in Zero Branco, Province of Treviso (d. 2001)
  - Phyllis Koehn, American baseball pitcher who played in eight seasons of the All-American Girls Professional Baseball League; in Madison, Wisconsin (d. 2007)
- Died: Mary Ann Booth, 79, American scientist and specialist in microscopic photography of microorganisms, died from an apoplexy-related (b. 1843)

== September 16, 1922 (Saturday) ==
- The first of the Shriners Hospitals for Children was opened in Shreveport, Louisiana.
- British troops with heavy artillery invaded Turkey to prevent the Turks from taking control of the Dardanelles and Bosphorus Strait, which connected the Black Sea to the Aegean Sea and then to the Mediterranean Sea.
- The Scholastic Corporation, founded in the U.S. by journalist Maurice R. Robinson in 1920, published its first issue of the nationally-distributed periodical for high school students, Scholastic Magazine, and would go on to expand its media offerings to books, book clubs, recordings, television shows and films.
- Lev Kamenev was named as the "acting president of the cabinet of ministers", equivalent to a Prime Minister of Soviet Russia, by decree of the head of state, Mikhail Kalinin, the chairman of the executive committee. Kamenev acted in place of the ailing Vladimir Lenin, the Communist Party First Secretary who had also served in the government as the premier.
- Henry Ford shut down his production plants indefinitely, leaving 100,000 workers idle, because he did not want to pay profiteers in the coal and steel industry.
- Anastasios Charalambis became the Prime Minister of Greece for a single day, replacing Nikolaos Triantafyllakos who had stepped down along with his cabinet in the wake of calls from protesters.
- The League of Nations approved the Trans-Jordan memorandum setting the boundaries of the Kingdom of Jordan, with the Jordan River setting the border between the Palestine mandate (and future nation of Israel) and "Trans-Jordan", literally the land on the other side of the Jordan River, an exempting Trans-Jordan from the Zionist declaration applied to the rest of Palestine.
- The Hall–Mills murder case began when Episcopal priest Edward Hall, and Eleanor Mills, a member of choir with whom he was having an affair, were found murdered outside of Brunswick, New Jersey, two days after they went missing. The case led to one of the most sensational trials of the 1920s.
- Born:
  - Janis Paige, American actress and singer; as Donna Mae Tjaden, in Tacoma, Washington (d. 2024)
  - Guy Hamilton, English film director, known for directing four James Bond films, including Goldfinger and Live and Let Die; as Mervyn Ian Guy Hamilton, in Paris (d. 2016)
  - Thomas J. Gary, U.S. Navy seaman who rescued four wounded men during the attack on Pearl Harbor before being killed; in Texas City, Texas (d. 1941)

== September 17, 1922 (Sunday) ==
- The Albanian Orthodox Church was founded as an autocephalous Eastern Orthodox Christian denomination at the close of the Congress of Berat, held in the city of Berat, to permit services in the Albanian language.
- Three organizations in Puerto Rico, all committed to independence of the territory from the United States, merged to form the Nationalist Party of Puerto Rico (PNPR). The leaders of the Independence Association, the Nationalist Association of Puerto Rico and the Nationalist Youth banded together as a unified organization under the administration of Independence Association president José Coll y Cuchí.
- The Kansas City Speedway held its inaugural race, won by Tommy Milton. The race was marred by tragedy when driver Roscoe Sarles (who had finished second in the 1921 Indianapolis 500) was killed in a fiery crash.
- Greek Prime Minister Anastasios Charalambis resigned one day after taking office as King Constantine was forced to abdicate. Sotirios Krokidas was appointed as the new premier by the military government.
- Born:
  - Marianne Cohn, German-born French Resistance fighter, known for helping Jewish children escape France during the Nazi occupation and her poem "Je trahirai demain" ("Tomorrow, I will betray"); in Mannheim (d. beaten to death, 1944)
  - Agnès de La Barre de Nanteuil, French Resistance fighter known for helping Allied airmen escape from behind enemy lines; in Neuilly-sur-Seine (d. 1944)
  - Vance Bourjaily, American writer; in Cleveland, Ohio (d. 2010)
- Died: Richard B. Angus, 91, Scottish-born Canadian financier, banker and co-founder of the Canadian Pacific Railway (b. 1831)

== September 18, 1922 (Monday) ==
- The Turkish Army completed the "Great Offensive" (Büyük Taarruz), the three-week final push to rid Asia Minor of Greek occupational forces, winning the last battles of the Greco-Turkish War with the capture of Artake (Erdek) and Pegaea (Biga).
- Hungary was admitted to the League of Nations.
- The Canadian government, led by William Lyon Mackenzie King, informed Britain that authority from Parliament would be required before a Canadian force would be sent to defend the Dardanelles.
- The 47 miners trapped in the Argonaut Mine in Jackson, California on August 27 were found dead, twenty-two days after the August 27 accident. The recovery team from the U.S. Bureau of Mines found that the miners had built a wall and stuffed it with their clothing in an attempt to make an airtight block of carbon monoxide 4,350 feet (1,330 m) below the surface.
- The engagement of the Germany's deposed former Kaiser, Wilhelm II, to Hermine Reuss of Greiz was announced. The news was neither popular among his sons nor within monarchist circles, who found it distasteful that he remarry only a year after the death of his first wife.
- The New York Yankees defeated the St. Louis Browns, 3 to 2, to win a three-game series at St. Louis that ultimately decided the pennant winner of the American League. Going into the game, the Yankees had a record of 87-56 and the Browns 87-57. At season's end, the Yankees were 94-60 and the Browns 93-61. St. Louis first baseman George Sisler went hitless, ending his then-AL record streak at 41 games.

== September 19, 1922 (Tuesday) ==
- Several hundred of Greek residents of Cunda Island were massacred as the Turkish Army invaded and reclaimed the area. Surviving children were spared and sent to orphanages.
- U.S. President Warren G. Harding vetoed a version of the World War Adjusted Compensation Act, popularly referred to as the "Bonus Bill", and sent it back to Congress, with an explanation that "it establishes the very dangerous precedent of creating a treasury covenant to pay which puts a burden ... upon the American people, not to discharge an obligation, which the government always must pay, but to bestow a bonus which the soldiers themselves, while serving in the World War, did not expect."
- The Fordney–McCumber Tariff Act was passed in the United States, creating the highest tariff rates in American history.
- Born: Harvey D. Strassman, American psychiatrist and Korean War veteran known for documenting posttraumatic stress disorder after interviews with former POWs, published in his 1956 article "A Prisoner of War Syndrome: Apathy as a Reaction to Severe Stress" in The American Journal of Psychiatry; in Chicago (d. 2011)

== September 20, 1922 (Wednesday) ==
- The United States Senate fell 4 votes shy of the two-thirds majority required to override President Harding's veto of the Soldier's Bonus Bill. despite Harding's own prediction that the bill would be passed anyway. The House of Representatives had voted overwhelmingly, 258 to 54, to override the veto. In the Senate, with only 72 senators present and 48 votes necessary for the two-thirds requirement, the vote to override was 44 to 28.
- A press conference was held in New York to announce the formation of a new company, with a one million dollar initial investment, to market and develop "a process of coloring motion pictures in their natural tints," invented by chemical engineer Daniel Frost Comstock of the Massachusetts Institute of Technology. The company, called Techni Color, Inc., would become the dominant supplier for color film during most of the 20th century. Reporters were invited to a private showing of a demonstration film to take place the next day, and a public display was promised for October.
- In Paris, French Prime Minister Raymond Poincaré, British Foreign Secretary Lord Curzon and Italian diplomat Carlo Sforza met to discuss the Chanak Crisis.
- Born: Leslie Buck, Slovak-born American businessman and inventor of the Anthora coffee cup popular in Greek-owned coffee shops in New York City; as Laszlo Büch, in Chust, Czechoslovakia (present-day Khust, Ukraine) (d. 2010)

== September 21, 1922 (Thursday) ==
- U.S. President Warren G. Harding signed the Grain Futures Act into law, as well as the Lodge–Fish Resolution, a U.S. endorsement of creation of a Jewish homeland in Palestine.
- A total eclipse of the Sun took place over the Indian Ocean and much of Australia, and was used to test Albert Einstein's Theory of Relativity.
- French aviator Joseph Sadi-Lecointe became the first person to travel faster than 200 miles per hour (320 km/h), averaging that speed while flying a 100 kilometres (62 mi) course.
- The plants of the Ford Motor Company re-opened after five days of idleness.
- Cleveland Indians manager Tris Speaker conducted an unusual experiment by inserting 21 players, many of them minor leaguers, into a game against the visiting Boston Red Sox. Among the players he brought in was pitcher Elmer "Doc" Hamann, who faced seven batters, none of whom were called out, giving Hamann the unusual distinction of an Earned Run Average (ERA) of infinity for his career. The Indians lost, 15 to 5.
- Born:
  - Lee Hee-ho, South Korean women's rights activist and peace advocate, served as the First Lady of South Korea from 1998 to 2003; in Jongno, Keijō, Chōsen (present-day Seoul, South Korea) (d. 2019)
- Died:
  - Frederick Thomas Trouton, 58, Irish physicist known for formulating Trouton's rule on the entropy of vaporization (b. 1863)
  - Charles C. Rumsey, 43, American polo player and sculptor, was killed in an automobile accident after being thrown from the car where he was riding as a passenger. (b. 1879)

== September 22, 1922 (Friday) ==
- In a bout for boxing's world light heavyweight championship, held in Paris between title holder Georges Carpentier of France and Louis Mbarick Fall (who fought under the name "Battling Siki") of Senegal, Siki was supposed to lose on purpose in return for not being injured by Carpentier. When Carpentier knocked Siki down in the fifth round, Siki knocked Carpentier out in the sixth round and (after a disqualification by the referee that was reversed by the ringside judges), Siki became the new world champion.
- Turkish nationalists seized Ezine, Çanakkale in the Allied neutral zone of Turkey.
- The Cable Act (named for its sponsor, Congressman John L. Cable) was signed into law in the United States, allowing an American woman who married a non-U.S. citizen to keep her citizenship if her husband was eligible to become a citizen.
- The existence of Dorothy Ruth, one-year-old daughter of Babe Ruth, became public knowledge for the first time following weeks of sightings of Babe and wife Helen with the child around the New York hotel where they lived. Helen claimed that it had been kept a secret from the public because the baby had been ill since birth, but the truth was that the child was the product of one of Babe's extramarital affairs.
- Born:
  - John Carter, American film editor, the first African American film editor to work at a national television network; in Newark, New Jersey (d. 2018)
  - David Sive, American attorney, pioneer in the development of environmental law; in Brooklyn, New York (d. 2014)

== September 23, 1922 (Saturday) ==
- The U.S. Army airship C-2 completed the first transcontinental airship flight across the United States, arriving at Ross Field in Arcadia, California after having set off from Langley Field in Virginia on September 14.
- After three days of discussion in Paris the representatives of France, Great Britain and Italy sent Turkey a proposal to hold a conference for a peaceful settlement of the Chanak Crisis.

== September 24, 1922 (Sunday) ==
- In the wake of the disastrous defeat in war against Turkey, the Greek military rebelled against the government, with the formation of a Revolutionary Committee headed by Greek Army Colonels Nikolaos Plastiras and Stylianos Gonatas as representative of the army in Lesvos, and Greek Navy Commander Dimitrios Fokas, who demanded the abdication of King Constantine and the resignation of the government of Prime Minister Nikolaos Triantafyllakos and commandeered an invasion of Athens. The event is referred to in Greece as the "Revolution of 11 September 1922" (Epanástasi tis 11is Septemvríou 1922) because Greece still used the Julian calendar and did not adopt the Gregorian calendar until March 1, 1923.
- The Royal Navy destroyer HMS Speedy collided with a tugboat while on maneuvers in the Sea of Marmara within Turkey, and sank within seven minutes, drowning 10 of its crew. The other 87 crewmen were rescued.
- Turkey made a counteroffer to the Allied conference offer for peace in the Greco-Turkish War, saying it would not consent to the demilitarization of the Sea of Marmara and Thrace.
- The little-known Senegalese fighter Battling Siki stunned the boxing world and won the Light Heavyweight Title by knocking out Georges Carpentier in the 6th round before almost 60,000 people in Paris.
- The memoirs of the former German Emperor, Kaiser Wilhelm II, were printed in 30 installments in The New York Times, the Chicago Tribune, and other newspapers they had contracts with. The author was listed as "William Hohenzollern, Former German Emperor William II" after purchasing the rights on September 15. The first installment began with the ex-Kaiser's memories of the year 1878, and his rebuttal to certain accusations made against him ("it is stupid to accuse me of not having recognized the greatness of Prince Bismarck (the longtime German Chancellor). The opposite is the truth. I revered and idolized him. Nor could it be otherwise.")
- Born:
  - Hans Waldmann, German Luftwaffe fighter ace who shot down 85 enemy aircraft during World War II before being killed in an accidental collision with another plane in his squadron; in Braunschweig (d. 1945)
  - Alice S. Rossi, American sociologist, feminist and co-founder of the National Organization for Women; as Alice Schaerr, in Brooklyn, New York (d. 2009)
  - Floyd Levin, American jazz historian and writer; in Minneapolis, Minnesota (d. 2007)
- Died: Burns D. Caldwell, 64, American businessman, president of the Wells Fargo Express Company, and founder of the Railway Express Agency package delivery service (b. 1858)

== September 25, 1922 (Monday) ==
- British general Sir Charles Harington gave Turkish forces in the neutral zone of the Dardanelles 48 hours to withdraw.
- The New York Giants clinched their second straight National League pennant with a 5–4 victory over the St. Louis Cardinals in 10 innings.
- Born:
  - Hammer DeRoburt, Nauruan politician and independence leader and the first President of Nauru from 1968 to 1976; in Nauru (d. 1992)
  - Vadim Kirpichenko, Soviet intelligence agent and KGB official; in Kursk, Russian SFSR, Soviet Union (d. 2005)
  - Ontethupalli Chinnappa Reddy, judge of the Supreme Court of India from 1978 to 1987; in Gooty, Madras Province, British India (now in Andhra Pradesh state) (d. 2013)
- Died: Carlo Caneva, 77, Italian Army General, known for leading the conquest of Libya in a war against the Ottoman Empire (b. 1845)

== September 26, 1922 (Tuesday) ==
- The U.S. Bureau of Prohibition implemented a change in policy in order to limit enforcement of prohibition laws to no further than three miles of the American coastline, except in cases where vessels outside the limit were in communication with shore.
- Born:
  - Takis Miliadis, Greek comedic actor; as Panagiotis Miliadis; in Athens (d. 1985)
  - Shirley Willer, American lesbian and gay rights activist; in Chicago (d. 1999)
- Died:
  - Thomas E. Watson, 66, American newspaper editor and politician who had served as the Senator of Georgia since 1921 to 1922,;, died of a cerebral hemorrhage .(b. 1856)
  - Charles R. Connell, 58, U.S. Representative for Pennsylvania since 1921, died from pleurisy. (b. 1864)
  - Ernst von Hoeppner, 62, German Prussian cavalry officer who served as the commander of the Luftstreitkräfte during World War I, died from influenza. (b. 1860)
  - Charles Spencer, 6th Earl Spencer, 65, former Lord Chamberlain of the United Kingdom and one of the largest landholders in Britain as the possessor of 27,000 acres or more than 42 square miles (110 km^{2}) of land (b. 1857)

== September 27, 1922 (Wednesday) ==
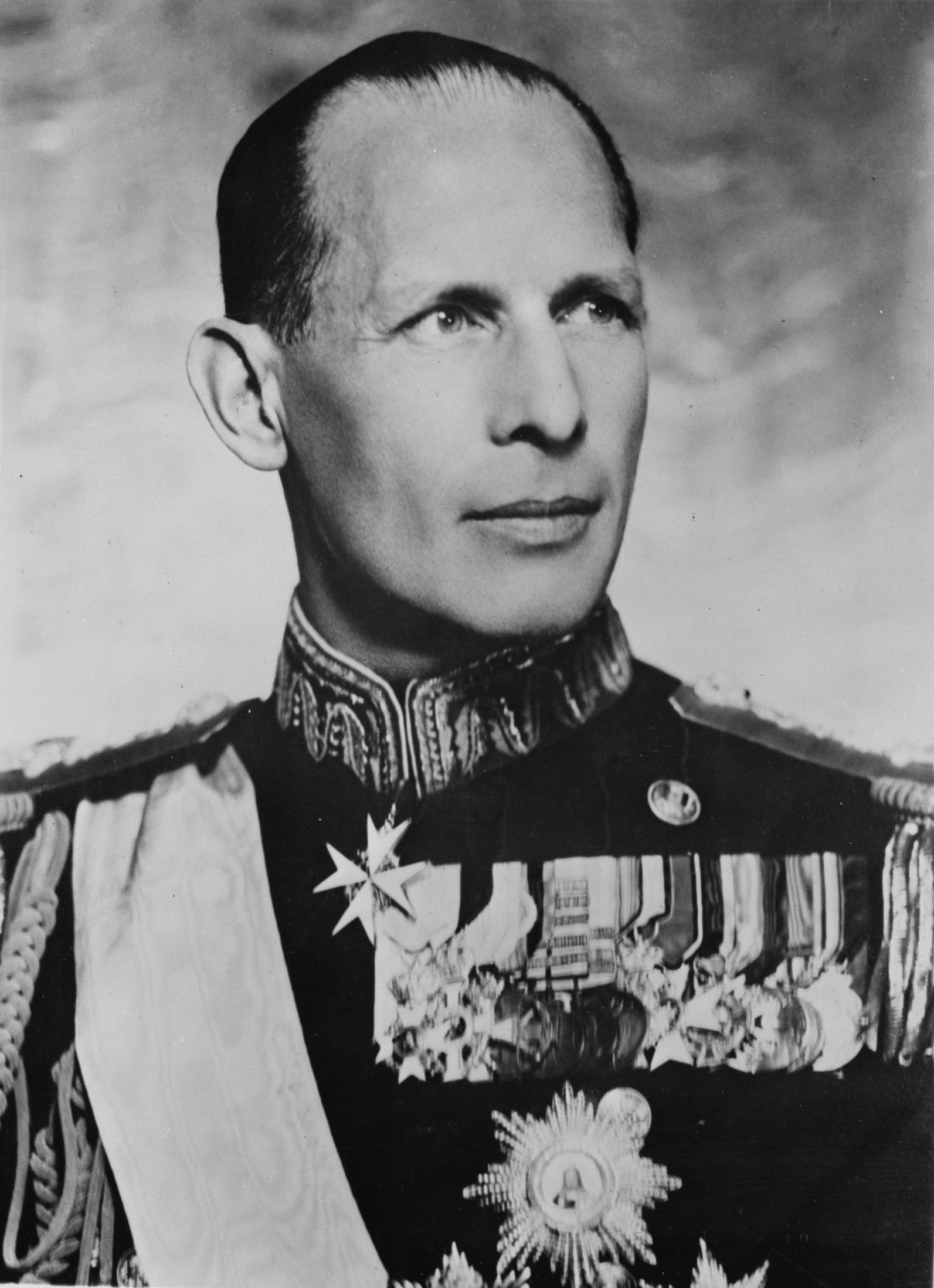
Former King Constantine, new King George II of Greece
- King Constantine of Greece abdicated the throne in the wake of Greece's defeat in the Greco-Turkish War. He stepped down in favor of his son, George II and the Greek cabinet resigned. Constantine had previously abdicated in 1917 in favor of another son, Alexander, then returned to the throne in 1920 upon Alexander's death.
- Ireland's parliament, the Dáil, voted to approve the "Special Powers Act", authorizing the Irish National Army to establish trials and to impose death sentences for activity in opposition to the Anglo-Irish Treaty.
- The first 3D film, The Power of Love, premiered at the Ambassador Hotel in Los Angeles. The silent film, made with a stereoscopic camera with the Anaglyph 3D system (one red lens and one green lens filming from different angles), was rendered in three dimensions with the use of spectacles with two different lenses. The finale consisted of two different endings showing at the same time, with the viewer given the option of closing one eye in order to see a happy ending or a tragic ending.
- Born: Mikhail Shuydin, Soviet Russian comedian and circus entertainer; in Kazachy, RSFSR, Soviet Union (d. 1983)
- Died: C. Michie Smith, 68, Scottish astronomer (b. 1854)

== September 28, 1922 (Thursday) ==
- A bolt of lightning struck an arsenal of explosives and the blast killed 144 people at the Falconara Fort, located in Italy near La Spezia. According to the initial account from the Associated Press, the blast "destroyed everything within a radius of ten miles" after 1,500 tons of explosives went off despite being stored in deep tunnels.
- Raisuli, leader of Moroccan rebels, surrendered to Spanish authorities after decades of living outside their reach.
- Reisenweber's Cafe, one of the largest and most popular restaurants and nightclubs in New York City, was closed permanently after being found to have violated the Prohibition Volstead Act for continuing to serve liquor to its patrons.
- Born:
  - Romeo Cascarino, American opera, ballet and classical symphony composer; in Philadelphia (d. 2002)
  - Joe Silver, American stage, film, radio and TV actor known for his deep voice; in Chicago (d. 1989)
- Died: William J. Seymour, 52, African-American Pentecostal preacher and evangelist,, died from a heart attack. (b. 1870)

== September 29, 1922 (Friday) ==
- The De la Huerta–Lamont Treaty, signed on June 16 between Mexico and the United States, went into effect after ratification by the Congress of Mexico and the U.S. Senate.
- Turkish nationalist leader Mustafa Kemal agreed to meet the Allies for a conference.
- The Evangelical Lutheran Good Samaritan Society, the largest non-profit provider of senior housing and services in the U.S., was incorporated in North Dakota by the Reverend August Hoeger.
- The Bertolt Brecht play Drums in the Night was first performed at the Munich Kammerspiele.
- Died: Robert Pearce, 82, British politician who introduced the Daylight Saving Bill in 1908 to place Britain on daylight saving time (b. 1840)

== September 30, 1922 (Saturday) ==
- In the wake of the capture by the Turkish Army recaptured the city of Kydoniae (renamed Ayvalık) from Greece, Greek Orthodox priests in the city waited for evacuation by ship on the recommendation of their superior, the Metropolitan Bishop Gregory Orologas. The group was arrested at the harbor by order of the Turkish occupational force, and the assembled priests were executed three days later.
- Sotirios Krokidas became the interim Prime Minister of Greece following the overthrow of the government.
- The New York Yankees clinched the American League pennant with a 3–1 win over the Boston Red Sox, finishing one game ahead of the second-place St. Louis Browns.
