= Xenophon Stratigos =

Major general Xenophon Stratigos
- Ξενοφών Στρατηγός
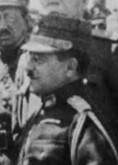
- Xenophon Stratigos in Asia Minor c. 1921

Minister of Transport
- In office 2 March – 3 May 1922
- Monarch: Constantine I
- Prime Minister: Dimitrios Gounaris
- Preceded by: Panagiotis Tsaldaris
- Succeeded by: Konstantinos Drosopoulos
- In office 9 May – 28 August 1922
- Monarch: Constantine I
- Prime Minister: Dimitrios Gounaris; Nikolaos Stratos; Petros Protopapadakis
- Preceded by: Konstantinos Drosopoulos
- Succeeded by: Antonios Matsas

Personal details
- Born: 7 July 1869 Corfu, Kingdom of Greece
- Died: 11 March 1927 (age 57) Davos, Swiss Confederation
- Education: Hellenic Military Academy; Prussian War College
- Awards: Commander of the Order of the Redeemer

Military service
- Allegiance: Kingdom of Greece
- Branch/service: Hellenic Army
- Years of service: 1890–1917; 1920–1921
- Rank: Major General
- Commands: Chief of the Hellenic Army General Staff
- Battles/wars: Greco-Turkish War (1897); Balkan Wars; First Balkan War; Second Balkan War; Greco-Turkish War (1919-1922)

Xenophon Stratigos (Greek: Ξενοφών Στρατηγός; 7 July 1869 – 11 March 1927) was a Greek military officer. He played a major role in the Balkan Wars of 1912–13 and the Asia Minor Campaign of the Greco-Turkish War in 1921–22, serving also as de facto Chief of the Hellenic Army General Staff in 1916–17 and in 1921. He retired from the army in September 1921 and served as Minister for Transport in 1922. Condemned to life imprisonment at the Trial of the Six, he was later pardoned and left for Switzerland, where he lived until his death.

== Life ==
Xenophon Stratigos was born in Corfu on 7 July 1869. He studied in the Hellenic Military Academy, graduating on 10 August 1890 as a 2nd Lieutenant of Engineers. He fought in the Greco-Turkish War of 1897, after which he was sent for studies at the Prussian War College in Berlin. During the Balkan Wars of 1912–13, he served as a staff officer in the operations department of the Greek General Headquarters, with the rank of captain.

In 1915 he was appointed head of the Intelligence Directorate of the Army Staff Service, and became Deputy Chief of Staff in 1916. From November 1916 until June 1917, he substituted as Chief of the Staff Service, as the latter post was vacant. A staunch monarchist, he was dismissed from the Army in 1917 due to the National Schism, but returned following the electoral defeat of Eleftherios Venizelos in November 1920. Promoted to Major General (retroactive from 1919), he was again appointed Deputy Chief of the General Staff. As Greece was embroiled in the Asia Minor Campaign, he was named personal liaison between King Constantine I and the Headquarters of the Army of Asia Minor during the 1921 Greek offensive operations.

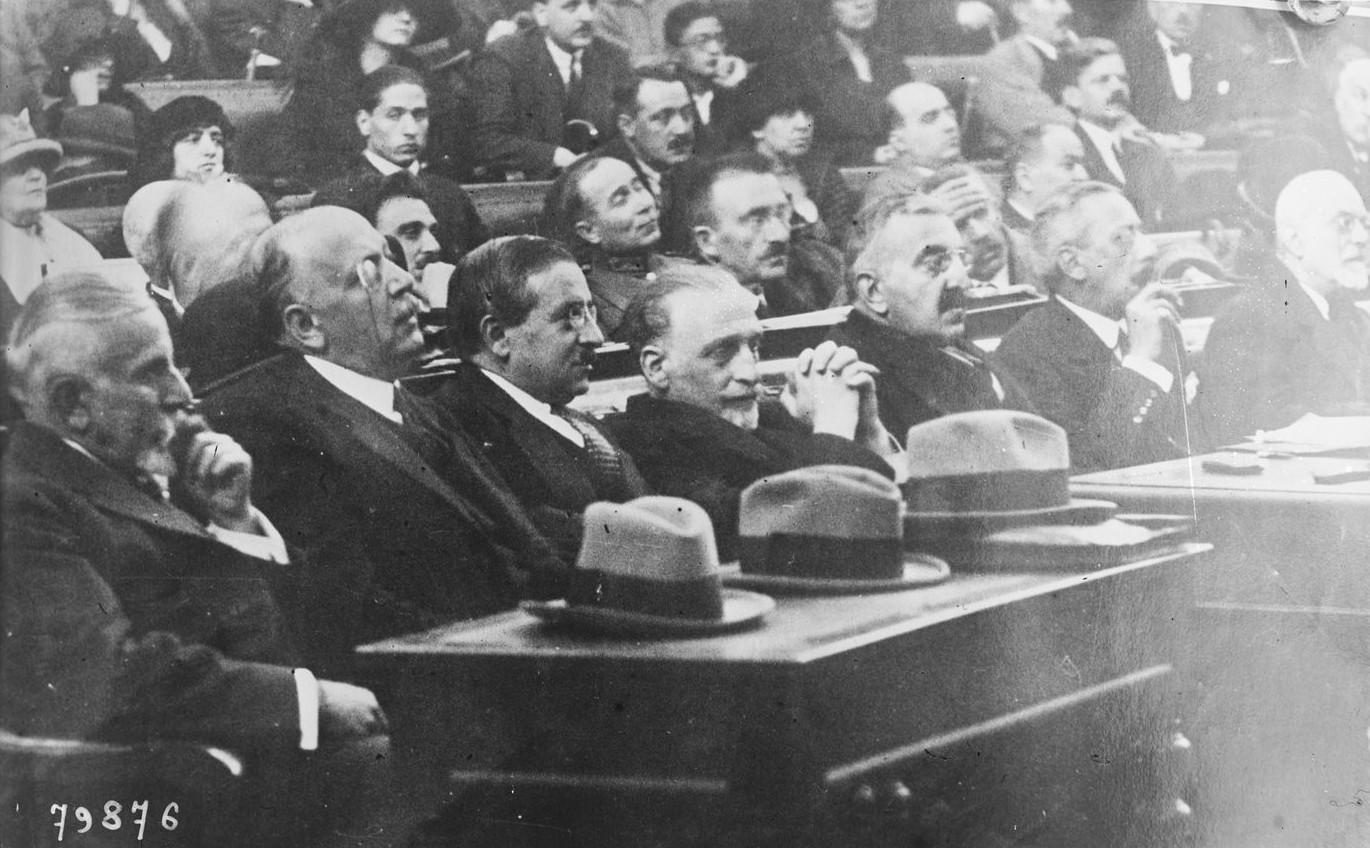
Stratigos (third from the left) during the Trial of the Six.

On 28 September 1921 he retired from the Army, and went on to serve as Transport Minister in the last cabinet of Dimitrios Gounaris (2 March – 3 May 1922), and again in the same post in the cabinet of Petros Protopapadakis (9 May – 28 August 1922). Following the Greek defeat in Asia Minor and the September 1922 Revolution, he was condemned to lifelong imprisonment by a revolutionary tribunal on 15 November for high treason. He remained in prison until pardoned in a general amnesty, and left for Switzerland. There he dedicated himself to writing, compiling a study of the Asia Minor Campaign (Η Ελλάς εν Μικρά Ασία) in 1925, as well as a Greek translation of Balck's Entwicklung der Taktik im Weltkriege.

He died in Davos on 11 March 1927.

Political offices
Preceded by Panagiotis Tsaldaris	Minister for Transport of Greece; 2 March – 3 May 1922	Succeeded by Konstantinos Drosopoulos
Preceded by Konstantinos Drosopoulos	Minister for Transport of Greece; 9 May – 28 August 1922	Succeeded by Antonios Matsas
