= 11 September 1922 Revolution =

Military uprising against the Athens government

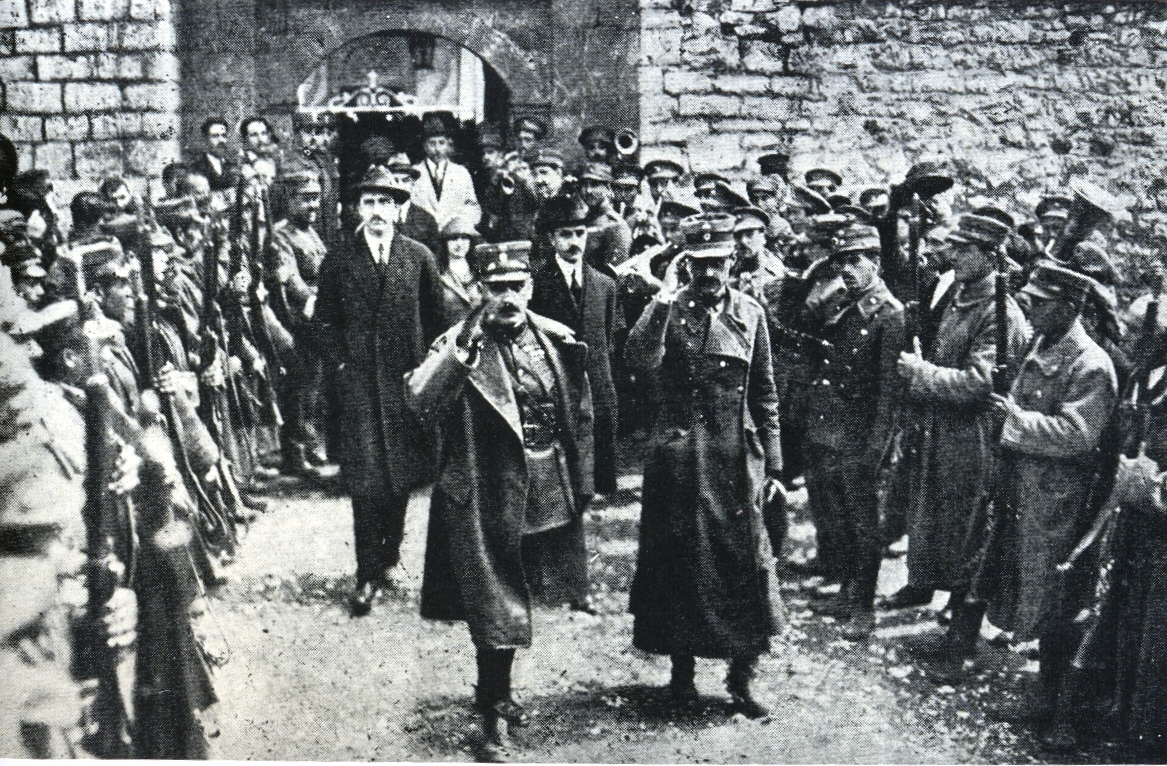
Nikolaos Plastiras, Stylianos Gonatas and Georgios Papandreou, 1922, in Mousounitsa

The 11 September 1922 Revolution (Greek: Επανάσταση της 11ης Σεπτεμβρίου 1922) was an uprising by the Greek Army and Navy against the government in Athens, which installed a "Revolutionary Committee" in its place. The uprising took place on 24 September 1922, although the date was "11 September" on the Julian calendar still in use at the time in Greece.

== History ==
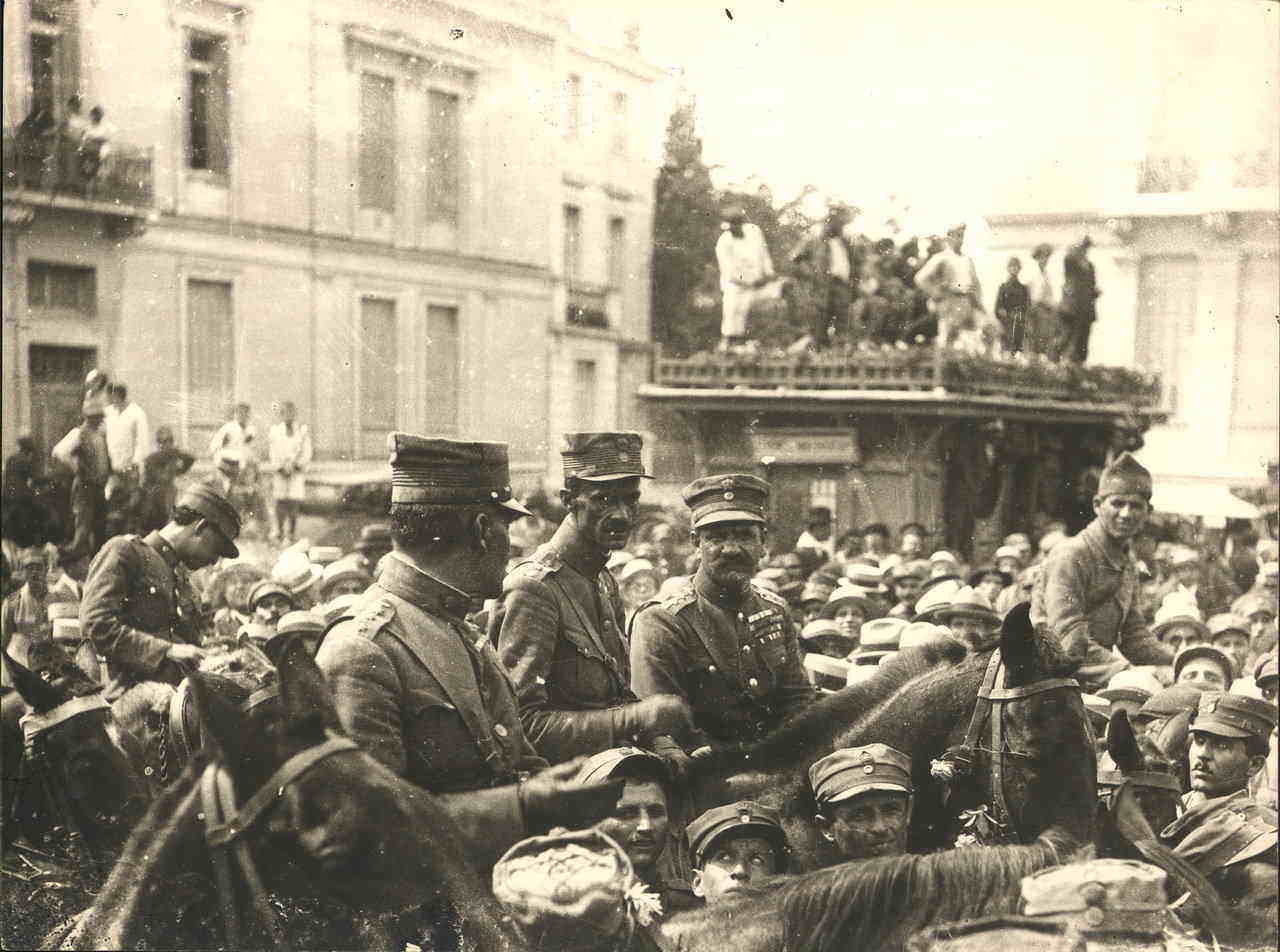
Plastiras with Gonatas and Protosyngelos enter Athens, 1922

The Greek Army had just been defeated in the Asia Minor Campaign and had been evacuated from Anatolia to the Greek islands in the eastern Aegean. Discontent among the middle-ranking officers and men for the campaign's conduct by the royal government boiled over into armed revolt led by pro-Venizelist and anti-royalist officers. The mutiny spread quickly and seized power in Athens, forcing King Constantine I to abdicate and leave the country, with a military government ruling the country until early 1924, shortly before the Greek monarchy was abolished and the Second Hellenic Republic established.

The defeat of the Greek forces in Anatolia had alarmed the people and caused them to ask for the punishment of those responsible for the defeat. The government of Petros Protopapadakis resigned and on 28 August, the new government headed by Nikolaos Triantafyllakos.

On 11 September a revolution was declared, with the formation of a Revolutionary Committee headed by Colonel Nikolaos Plastiras as representative of the army in Chios, Colonel Stylianos Gonatas as representative of the army in Lesvos and Commander Dimitrios Fokas as representative of the navy. The next day, the troops boarded their ships and headed to Athens. Before they arrived there, a military aeroplane delivered a manifesto that was asking the resignation of King Constantine I, the dissolution of the Parliament, the formation a new politically independent government that would have the support of the alliances of the Entente and the immediate reinforcement of the battlefront in Eastern Thrace.

On 13 September, the ships with the Greek army arrived in Lavrio and the next day, King Constantine resigned and went into exile in Italy. His son, George II, was declared king. On 15 September, the troops of revolution entered the city of Athens and blocked the efforts Theodoros Pangalos was making to take advantage of the situation and take control of the government. Soon a new government was formed, with Sotirios Krokidas as chairman.

== See also ==
- Trial of the Six
