= Anastasios Charalambis =

Greek Lieutenant General (1862–1949)

- Αναστάσιος Χαραλάμπης
- Anastasios Charalambis c. 1913–17

Prime Minister of Greece
- In office 16 September 1922 – 17 September 1922
- Monarch: George II
- Preceded by: Nikolaos Triantafyllakos
- Succeeded by: Sotirios Krokidas

Minister for Military Affairs
- In office 16 September 1922 – 14 November 1922
- Prime Minister: Himself; Sotirios Krokidas
- Preceded by: Nikolaos Triantafyllakos
- Succeeded by: Theodoros Pangalos

Minister for the Interior
- In office 16 September 1922 – 17 September 1922
- Prime Minister: Himself
- Preceded by: G. Bousios
- Succeeded by: Sotirios Krokidas

Personal details
- Born: 22 September 1862 Kalavryta, Kingdom of Greece
- Died: 11 March 1949 (aged 86) Athens, Kingdom of Greece
- Awards: Order of the Redeemer; Legion of Honour

Military service
- Allegiance: Kingdom of Greece; (Greece) Second Hellenic Republic
- Branch/service: Hellenic Army
- Years of service: 1884–1922; 1927
- Rank: Lieutenant General
- Commands: 1st Infantry Division (Chief of Staff); 6th Infantry Division (Chief of Staff); II Army Corps (Chief of Staff)
- Wars: Greco-Turkish War (1897); Balkan Wars: First Balkan War; Second Balkan War; World War I: Macedonian front

Anastasios Charalambis (Greek: Αναστάσιος Χαραλάμπης; 22 September 1862 – 11 March 1949) was a Greek Lieutenant General and interim Prime Minister of Greece for one day in 1922. Before retiring from the Army in 1918, Charalambis commanded the II Army Corps. He was previously an officer in the 6th and 1st Infantry Division serving during the Balkan Wars of 1912–1913, the Second Balkan War, and the Greco-Turkish War of 1897.

== Military service ==
Anastasios Charalambis was born in Kalavryta on 22 September 1862. After studying in the Hellenic Military Academy, he was commissioned as 2nd Lieutenant of Cavalry on 25 July 1884. He was promoted to lieutenant in 1888 and captain in 1895, and fought in the Greco-Turkish War of 1897.

He was again promoted to major in 1908, lieutenant colonel in 1910 and colonel in 1913. During the Balkan Wars of 1912–1913, he served as Chief of Staff of the 1st Infantry Division in Macedonia, then of the 6th Infantry Division in the operations in Epirus, before returning to the 1st Division for the operations against the Kingdom of Bulgaria in the Second Balkan War.

In 1914 he was placed as Chief of Staff to the II Army Corps, and then as Director of the Artillery Bureau of the Ministry of Military Affairs. From 26 April to 19 May and from 22 May to 14 June 1917 he served as Minister of Military Affairs, and then from 26 June as Chief of the Army's Staff Service until November. In early 1918 he was placed in command of the II Army Corps, and retired from the Army on 23 July 1918. He was promoted to major general in 1917 and Lt. General in 1918.

== Prime minister ==
Following the defeat against Turkey in Anatolia, the government of Petros Protopapadakis fell, and Greece was plunged into a political crisis. A military revolt, led by Venizelist officers, erupted in September 1922, and demanded the resignation of King Constantine I and of Prime Minister Nikolaos Triantafyllakos. Their demands were met, and the revolutionary committee installed a new government, with Alexandros Zaimis as Prime Minister and Charalambis as Minister of Military Affairs. As Zaimis was out of the country, Sotirios Krokidas was appointed as interim prime minister.

Until Krokidas could reach Athens to be sworn in, Charalambis was sworn in as temporary Prime Minister and Minister for Military Affairs on 16 September, serving for one day (and concurrently also as provisional Interior Minister). After Krokidas arrived, he assumed the posts of Prime Minister and Interior Minister, while Charalambis remained Minister for Military Affairs until the cabinet's resignation on 14 November 1922.

== Council chairman ==
He was recalled from retirement in 1927 to serve as chairman of the military council for the re-admission of officers purged for political reasons over the previous years. Charalambis died on 11 March 1949.

Military offices
| Preceded by Major General Xenofon Stratigos | Chief of the Hellenic Army Staff Service; 26 June – November 1917 | Vacant Title next held by Major General Aristotelis Vlachopoulos |
Political offices
| Preceded by Nikolaos Triantafyllakos | Prime Minister of Greece; 16–17 September 1922 | Succeeded by Sotirios Krokidas |
| Preceded by G. Bousios | Minister for the Interior; 16–17 September 1922 | Succeeded by Sotirios Krokidas |
| Preceded by Nikolaos Triantafyllakos | Minister for Military Affairs; 16 September – 14 November 1922 | Succeeded by Theodoros Pangalos |
