= Nikolaos Triantafyllakos =

Prime minister of Greece (1855–1939)

- Νικόλαος Τριανταφυλλάκος
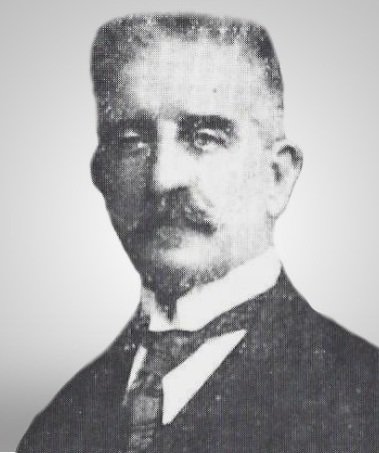

Prime Minister of Greece
- In office 28 August 1922 – 16 September 1922
- Monarch: Constantine I
- Preceded by: Petros Protopapadakis
- Succeeded by: Anastasios Charalambis

Personal details
- Born: Nikolaos Triantafyllakos; 8 November 1855 Tripoli, Kingdom of Greece
- Died: 16 September 1939 (aged 83) Athens, Kingdom of Greece
- Education: School of Law, National and Kapodistrian University of Athens

Nikolaos Triantafyllakos (Greek: Νικόλαος Τριανταφυλλάκος; 8 November 1855 - 16 September 1939) was a Prime Minister of Greece during a tumultuous time in Greek history from August to September 1922.

== Early Life and Political Career ==
Born 8 November 1855 in Tripoli, Triantafyllakos studied law at the University of Athens, and went on to further study in Germany, France, Switzerland. After a brief law career, he moved into politics and in 1892 was elected as member of parliament for Matineia Arcadia. In 1897 he was Minister of Justice, and then Minister of the Interior under Alexandros Zaimis in 1898, again in 1901 and 1909 under Kyriakoulis Mavromichalis and from 25 February 10 August 1915 in the government of Dimitrios Gounaris. As the Greek Army was losing battles and ceding territory to the Turkish National Movement in 1922, during the war in Asia Minor, the political situation in Athens began to deteriorate.

== Term as Prime Minister ==
The cabinet of Petros Protopapadakis resigned on 28 August, and Nikolaos Kalogeropoulos was entrusted by King Constantine with the formation of a new ministry. After two days spent in negotiations he failed in his task, and Nikolaos Triantafyllakos, the ex-high commissioner of Greece at Constantinople, was summoned, and succeeded with difficulty in forming a makeshift government.

In the meantime, excitement and dissatisfaction were steadily growing among the population, and strict measures were necessary for the maintenance of order. On 11 September, martial law was proclaimed, following the revolt of 8,000 troops and their officers in Thessaloniki, who sent word to Athens demanding the abdication of King Constantine and the imprisonment of two former prime ministers, Dimitrios Gounaris and Nikolaos Stratos.

This revolt was followed by a widespread rebellion of troops evacuated from Asia Minor to the islands of Mytilene, Chios, and Crete. The army contingents in Mytilene formed a Revolutionary Committee headed by Colonel Stylianos Gonatas, which despatched by aeroplane the following demands to Athens: the dismissal of the government, the dissolution of the parliament, the holding of new elections, and the abdication of King Constantine in favour of the Crown Prince, Crown Prince George. The revolutionary movement swiftly spread to other centres of Greece and to the Greek gunboats stationed at Mytilene and in and about the port of Piraeus.

The Cabinet and Prime Minister Triantafyllakos immediately resigned on 16 September. That same day, King Constantine abdicated for the second time in the course of his career, and the king's eldest son succeeded to the throne of Greece as King George II.

== Death ==
Triantafyllakos died in 1939.

Political offices
Preceded by Petros Protopapadakis	Prime Minister of Greece; 28 August – 16 September 1922	Succeeded by Anastasios Charalambis
