= Sotirios Krokidas =

Greek politician, lawyer and university professor (1852–1924)

- Σωτήριος Γ. Κροκίδας

Prime Minister of Greece
- In office 17 September 1922 – 14 November 1922
- Monarch: George II
- Preceded by: Anastasios Charalambis
- Succeeded by: Stylianos Gonatas

Personal details
- Born: Sotirios Krokidas; 13 January 1852 Sikyona, Kingdom of Greece
- Died: 29 July 1924 (aged 72) Perigiali, Kingdom of Greece
- Education: School of Law, University of Athens

Sotirios G. Krokidas (Greek: Σωτήριος Γ. Κροκίδας; 13 January 1852 – July 29, 1924) was an interim Prime Minister of Greece in 1922. He was a law professor in Athens.

== Biography ==
Sotirios Krokidas was born in Sikyona in Corinth in 1852. He studied law at the University of Athens, from which he also became a doctor. In the period 1881 - 1897 he was an assistant professor of commercial law at the Athens Law School. In 1883 he was elected mayor of Sikyona, while from 1892 he was elected deputy of Corinth. In 1917 he was appointed commander-in-chief of Crete, a position in which he remained until 1920.

When the Greek army was defeated in the Greco-Turkish War and the government of Petros Protopapadakis fell, Greece was plunged into a political crisis. In September, 1922, Nikolaos Triantaphillakos was Prime Minister as the military revolted in Thessaloniki and then in Mytilene. A revolutionary committee led by Stylianos Gonatas demanded the abdication of Constantine I of Greece and on September 26, 1922, the king abandoned his throne and the government of Triantaphillakos resigned. The revolutionary committee selected Alexandros Zaimis as Prime Minister, but as he was out of the country, Krokidas was appointed as interim Prime Minister. Until Krokidas could reach Athens to be sworn in, the Minister of the Army, Charalambis was sworn in as Prime Minister on September 29, and served for one day. On September 30, 1922, Krokidas became Prime Minister and Minister of the Interior.

He was responsible for constituting the extraordinary and controversial Trial of the Six which sentenced three former Prime Ministers and the General in command of Greek troops in the Greco-Turkish War to death for Greece's defeat in the war. Krokidas resigned on November 27, 1922, as a result of in-fighting among ministers concerning fallout from the Trial of the Six, and he was replaced by the leader of the Revolutionary committee, Stylianos Gonatas. The politicians and General were executed on November 28, 1922. Krokidas died in 1924.

Political offices
Preceded by Anastasios Charalambis	Prime Minister of Greece; 1922	Succeeded by Stylianos Gonatas
