= Kazachy =

Kazachy Казачий
- Village
- Location within Amur Oblast Location within Russia
- Coordinates: 49°03′N 130°49′E
- Country: Russia
- Region: Amur Oblast
- District: Arkharinsky District
- Time zone: UTC+9:00

Kazachy (Russian: Казачий) is a rural locality (a selo) in Kundursky Selsoviet of Arkharinsky District, Amur Oblast, Russia. The population was 2 in 2018. There is 1 street.

== Geography ==
Kazachy is located on Trans-Siberian Railway, 84 km southeast of Arkhara (the district's administrative centre) by road. Kundur is the nearest rural locality.
