= Trial of the Six =

1922 treason trial in Greece

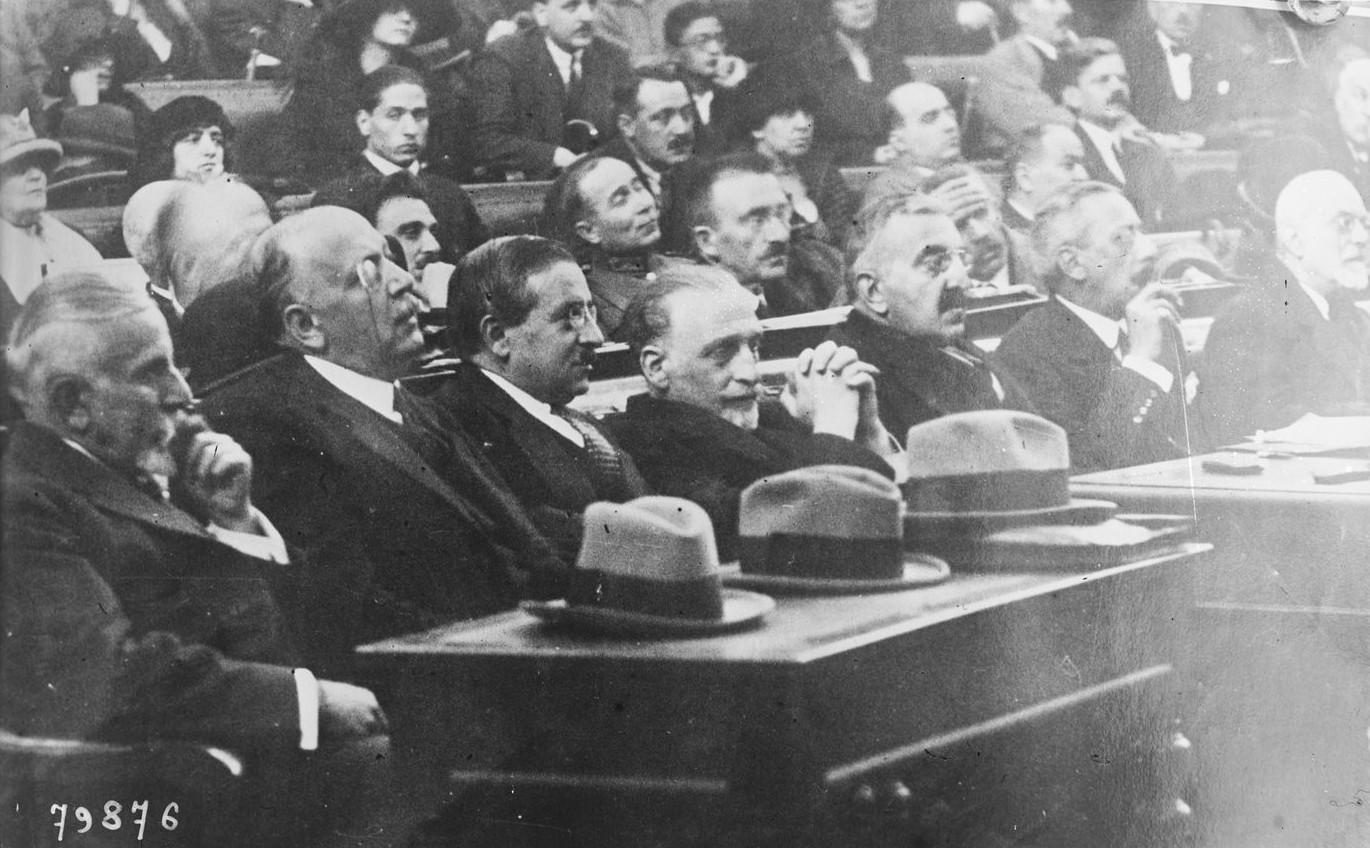
- The bench of the accused: from left to right, Goudas, Baltatzis, Stratigos, Gounaris, Stratos, Theotokis, Protopapadakis
- Court: extraordinary military tribunal in the then parliament building of Athens
- Started: 13 October 1922
- Decided: 28 November 1922
- Verdict: 6 sentenced to death; 2 sentenced to life in prison; 1 exiled
- Charge: High treason

Court membership
- Judge sitting: Alexandros Othonaios

The Trial of the Six (Greek: Δίκη των Έξ(ι), Díki ton Éx(i)) or the Execution of the Six was the trial for treason, in late 1922, of the Anti-Venizelist officials held responsible for the Greek military defeat in Asia Minor. All nine defendants were convicted, with six of them sentenced to death and executed promptly afterwards. In 2010, the Supreme Court of Greece overturned the convictions.

== Background ==
The years of World War I in Greece were defined by the National Schism, an at times violent conflict between King Constantine I and Prime Minister Eleftherios Venizelos over Greece's alignment in the conflict. Venizelos's pro-Entente faction prevailed in time for the Armistice of Mudros, and Greece, now under the leadership of King Alexander (a puppet of Venizelos) aggressively pursued the Greek-populated lands across the Aegean Sea, according to the irredentist Megali Idea. Greek troops landed in Asia Minor in May 1919, and their advance was emboldened by the signing of the Treaty of Sèvres in August 1920. The unexpected death of King Alexander months later, however, threw the Greek government and army into disarray and spelled the end of Entente aid to the Greek war effort. This collapse coincided with the increasing effectiveness of Turkish forces resisting the Greek advance, particularly troops under the command of the Soviet-backed Mustafa Kemal. Soon, Greek troops were in retreat across Asia Minor.

On 9 September 1922, Turkish military and guerilla forces entered the city of Smyrna (now İzmir). Hundreds of thousands of Greek residents from Asia Minor fled to Smyrna seeking transportation across the sea to escape the advancing Turks. The pro-royalist government in Athens lost control of the situation and could only watch as the events unfolded. The retreating Greek "Army of the East" abandoned Smyrna on 8 September, the day before the Turkish Army moved in. Transportation arrived late and in too small numbers relative to the number of people trying to flee, resulting in chaos and panic. The abandonment of Smyrna effectively marked the end of Greece's territorial aspirations in Asia Minor. Those who survived the bloody evacuation of the area and the ensuing ensuing conflagration would spend the rest of their lives as refugees. The loss of Greece's mandate in Asia Minor became known in Greece as "the Asia Minor Disaster" (Greek: Μικρασιατική Καταστροφή, Mikrasiatiki Katastrophi).

== Coup ==
Anti-royalist factions, seizing the moment of public outrage, moved against the Pro-Royalist government and a military coup d'état unfolded in Athens and the Aegean Islands. Backed by an angry civil response to the defeat in the fields of battle, on 11/24 September 1922, Colonels Nikolaos Plastiras and Stylianos Gonatas formed a "Revolutionary Committee" that demanded the abdication of King Constantine (considered responsible for the defeat). They demanded the royalist government's resignation and the punishment of those responsible for the military disaster. The coup was aided by Venizelist General Theodoros Pangalos, then stationed in Athens. Backed by massive demonstrations in the capital, the coup was successful: two days later, on 13/26 September, when Plastiras and Gonatas disembarked in the port of Laurium with the military units they commanded, King Constantine abdicated on 14/27 September in favour of his first-born son, George and sailed for Sicily, where he died four months later. The government ministers were arrested, and the new king consented to a new administration, one favorable to the coup.

Coup protagonists
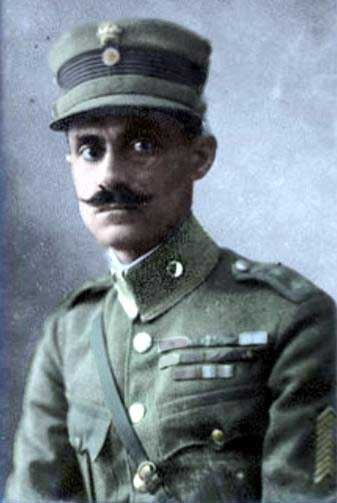
Nikolaos Plastiras

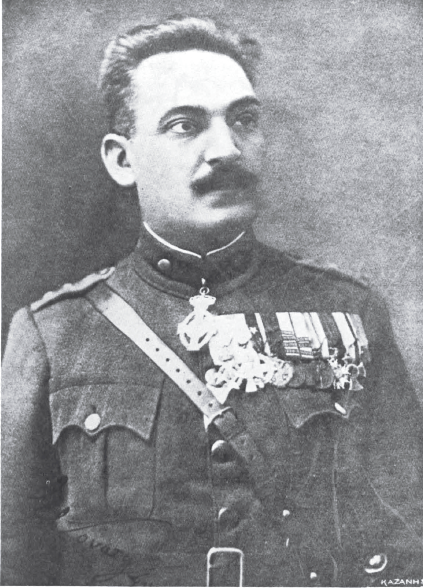
Stylianos Gonatas

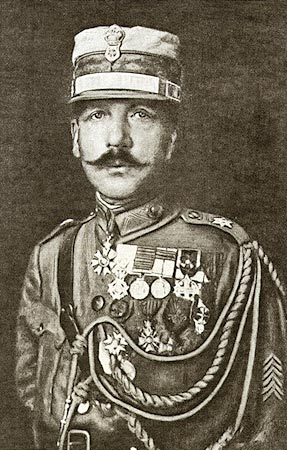
Theodoros Pangalos

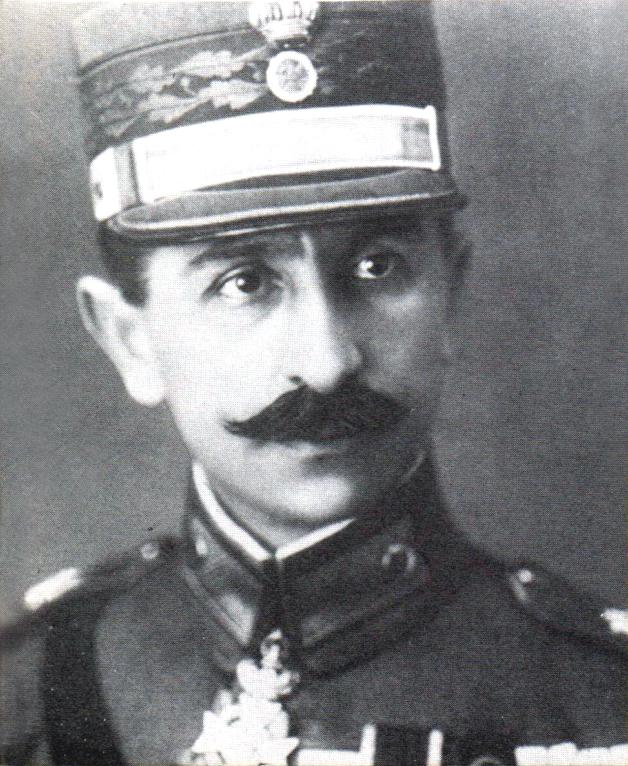
Alexandros Othonaios

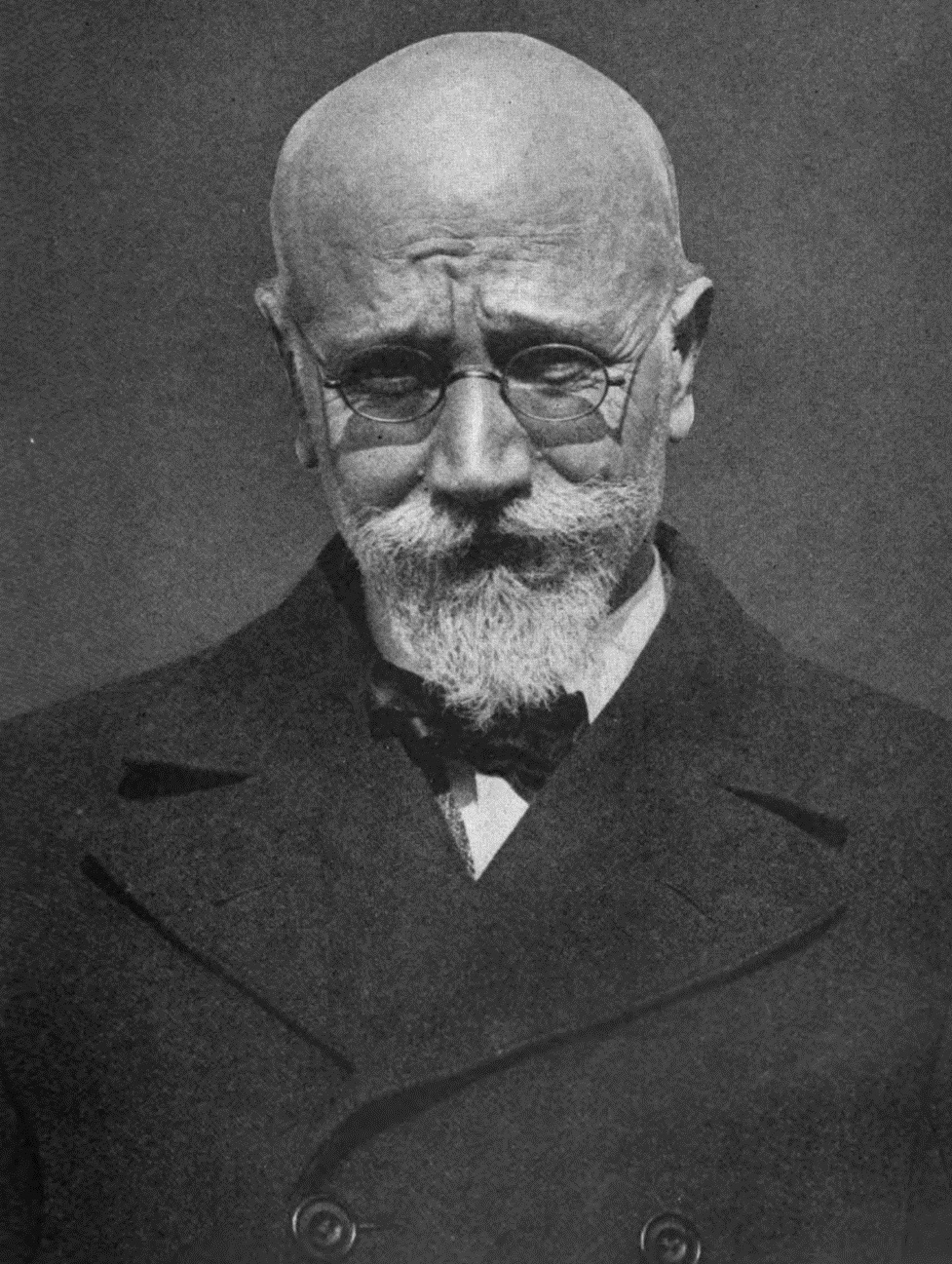
Eleftherios Venizelos, placed as exterior representative of Greece

== Trial and verdicts ==
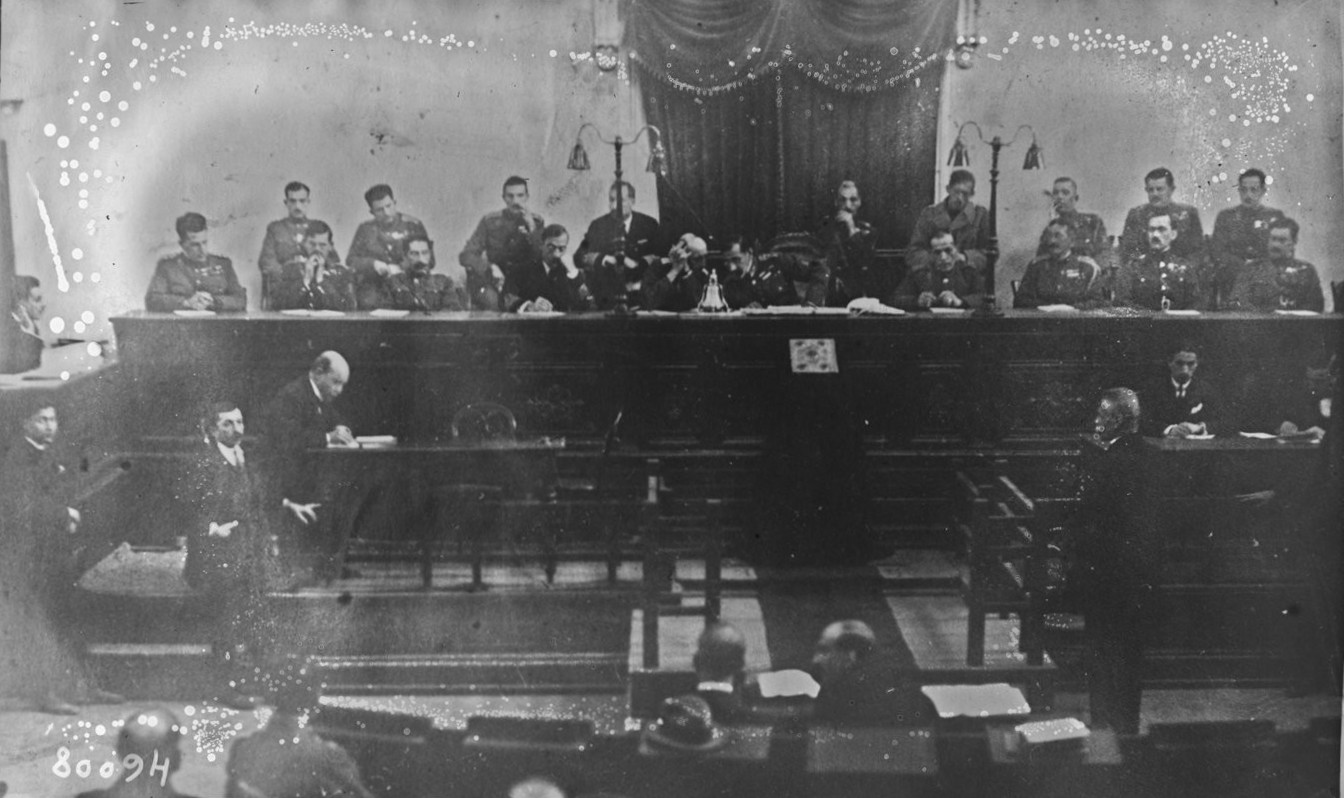
The military tribunal

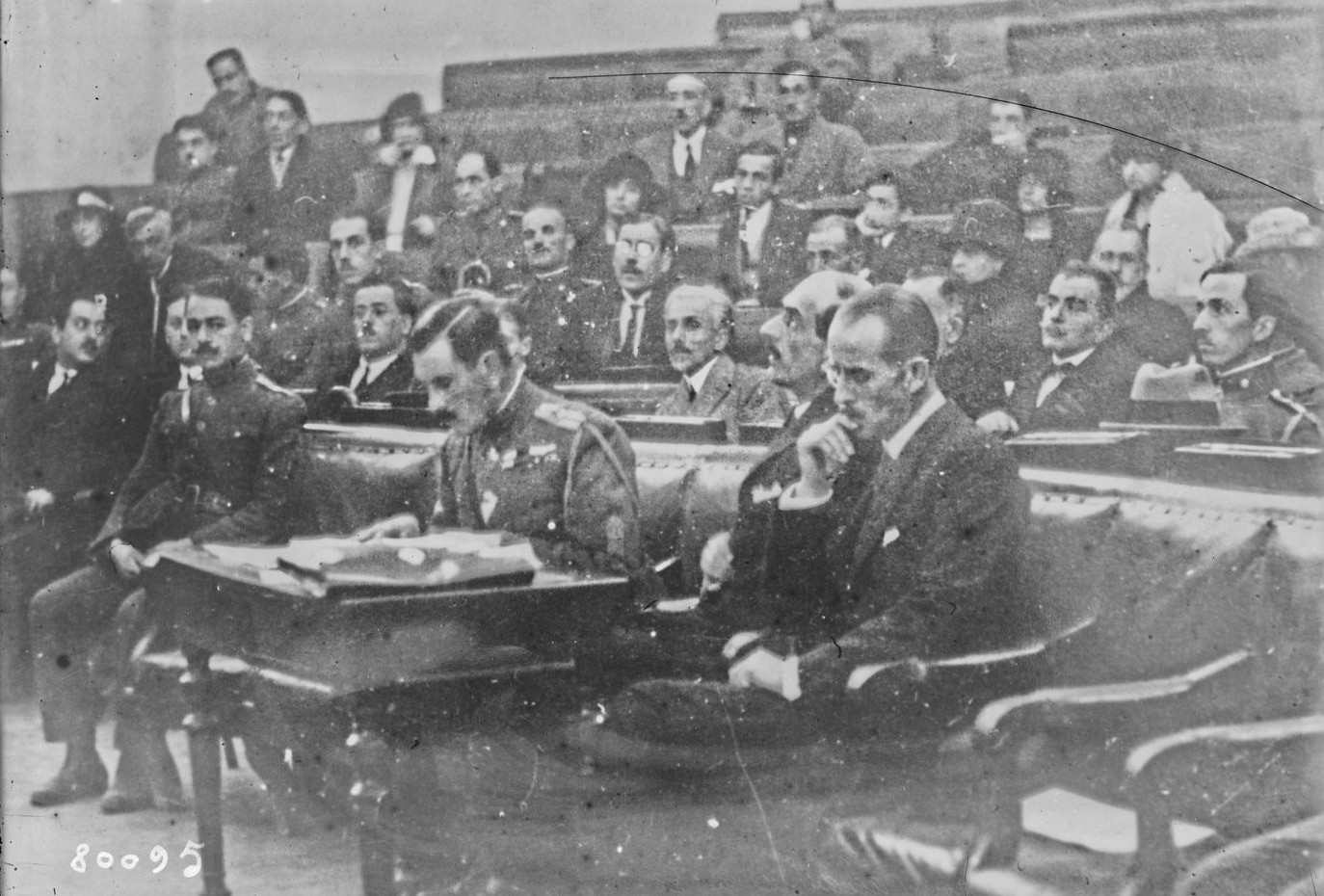
Prince Andrew on trial

On 25 October 1922 (12 October on the "old style" Greek calendar in use at the time), the junta constituted an "extraordinary military tribunal", which convened on 13 November (31 October) in the then parliament building and carried out a 15 day trial in which the five most senior members of the overthrown administration (Dimitrios Gounaris, Georgios Baltatzis (el), Nikolaos Stratos, Nikolaos Theotokis (el), and Petros Protopapadakis) and General Georgios Hatzianestis (last commander-in-chief of the Asia Minor campaign) were tried for high treason, convicted, and sentenced to death. They were executed a few hours after the verdict was handed down and before its publication on 28 November 1922 (15 November). The executions occurred at Goudi, a suburb of Athens. According to the decision, the six, with their support for the return of exiled Constantine to the throne and with their decisions during the war against Kemal, damaged the national interests and strained the relations with the Allies, leading the country to the defeat. The decision was previously taken to the office of Plastiras, "leader of the revolution," to sign. When the decision was published, it started with "In the name of the King of Hellenes George II".

Two defendants, Admiral Michail Goudas (el) and General Xenophon Stratigos, received a life imprisonment sentence. The ex-king's brother, Prince Andrew, also a senior commanding officer in the failed campaign, had been indicted as well but was in Corfu at the time. He was arrested, transported to Athens, tried by the same tribunal a few days later, found guilty of the same crimes, and sentenced to death. His sentence was then mitigated to banishment from Greece for life as he was found to be "completely lacking in high military command experience" (Greek: "της τελείας απειρίας περί την διοίκησιν ανωτέρων μονάδων"). The prince and his family (which included his infant son – carried in a wooden vegetable crate – Prince Philip, later the Duke of Edinburgh) were evacuated on the British warship HMS Calypso on December 4, leaving Corfu island for Brindisi.

Summary of the verdicts.

- Dimitrios Gounaris, Death
- Petros Protopapadakis, Death
- Nikolaos Stratos, Death
- Georgios Hatzianestis, Death
- Georgios Baltatzis, Death
- Nikolaos Theotokis, Death
- Xenophon Stratigos, Life imprisonment
- Michael Goudas, Life imprisonment
- Prince Andrew, Exile
Photos of some of the defendants and their verdicts
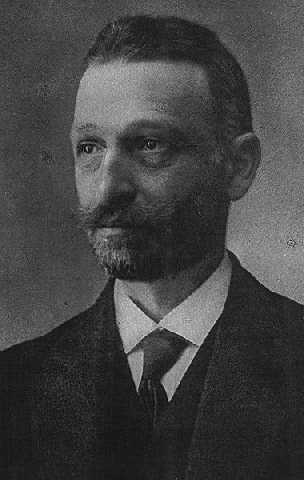
Dimitrios Gounaris, Death

Petros Protopapadakis, Death

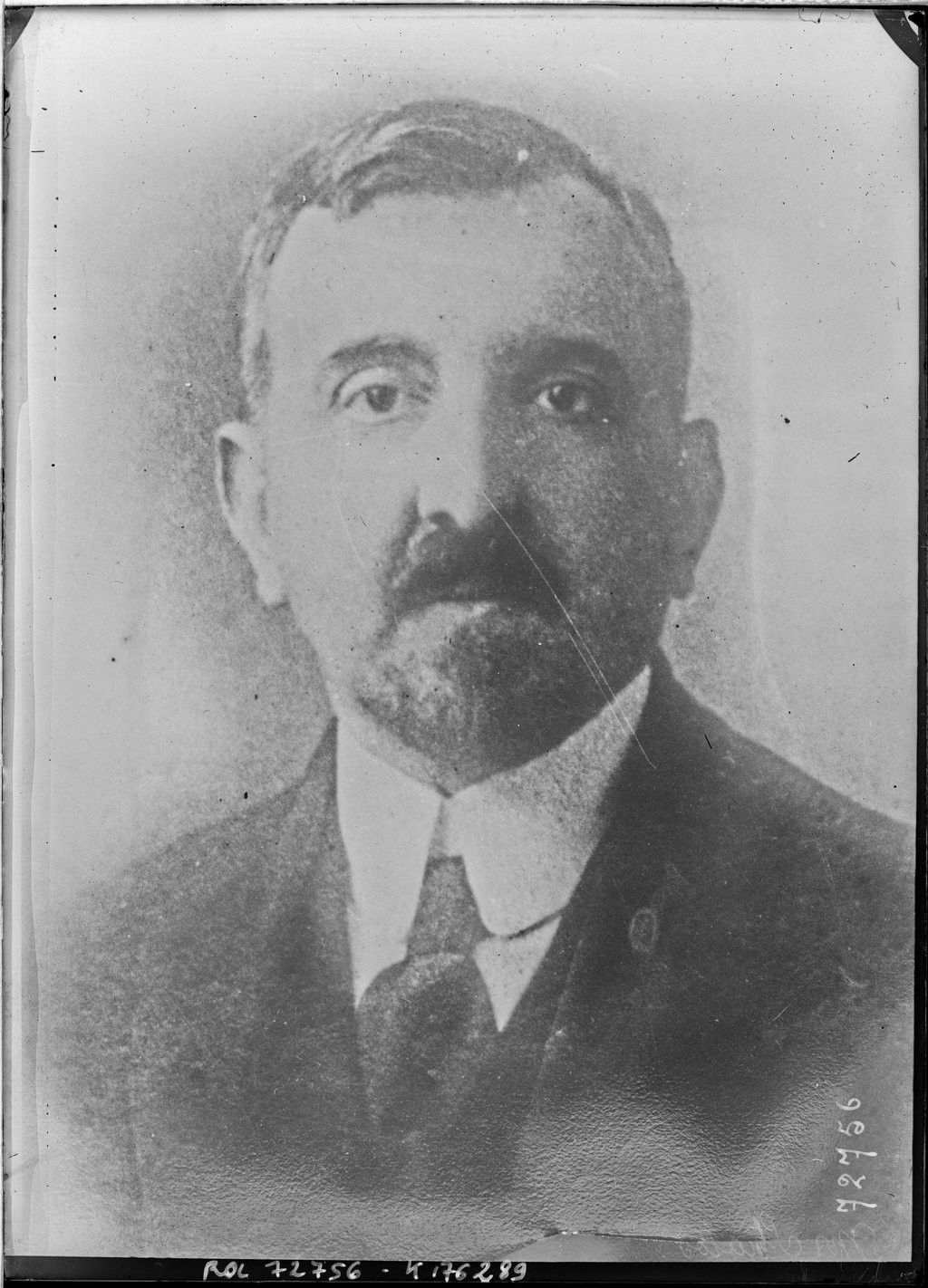
Nikolaos Stratos, Death

General Georgios Hatzianestis, Death

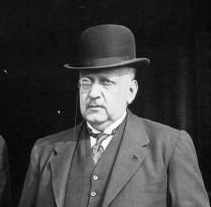
Georgios Baltatzis (el), Death

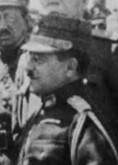
Xenophon Stratigos, Life imprisonment

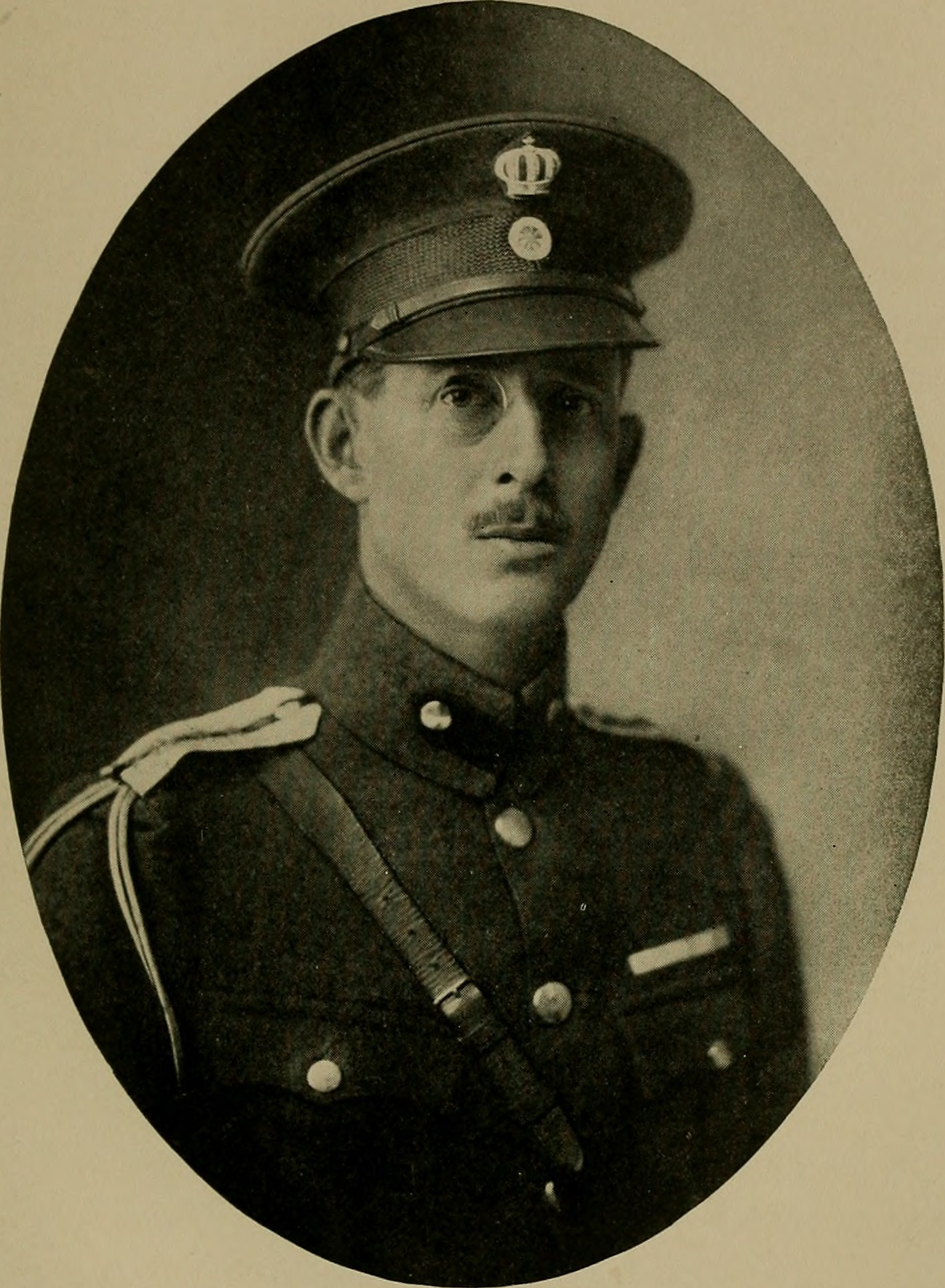
Prince Andrew, Exile

== Aftermath ==
The embassies of Sweden, Netherlands and United Kingdom objected and tried to cancel the punishments without success. After the executions, and in response, the United Kingdom withdrew its ambassador to Greece for some time.

The executions were a kind of shock for the Greek conservatives, while they exacerbated the conflict between the royalists and the liberals the next decades, at least until the establishment of the 4th of August Regime.

In 1932, during a speech in parliament, Prime Minister Venizelos supported that the victims were indeed not guilty "for treason", but he couldn't and wouldn't condemn any revolutionary officers of the military tribune, because they acted in patriotic and virtuous way.

== Overturned ==
In 2010, Greek courts annulled the convictions due to new evidence and then also dismissed the charges for high treason for the six due to the limitation period. Former prime minister Petros Protopapadakis’ grandson was able to present new evidence in court that had been absent in the 1922 trial and which was deemed sufficient for a retrial.

The lawsuit to overturn the previous convictions for high treason was made in an effort to rewrite school textbooks that had been unfair to the six, and promote the belief that the six had been scapegoats to appease public anger at the humiliation that the Greeks had suffered in the Asia Minor Catastrophe and that they (who had no desire to see Greek forces defeated) had been in reality just victims of circumstances they were unable to control.
