= Dimitrios Gounaris =

Greek politician (1867–1922)

- Δημήτριος Γούναρης
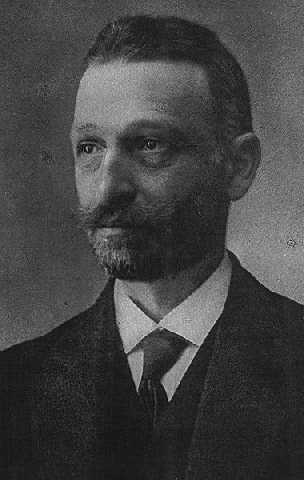
- Gounaris c. 1915

Prime Minister of Greece
- In office 26 March 1921 – 3 May 1922
- Monarch: Constantine I
- Preceded by: Nikolaos Kalogeropoulos
- Succeeded by: Nikolaos Stratos
- In office 25 February 1915 – 10 August 1915
- Monarch: Constantine I
- Preceded by: Eleftherios Venizelos
- Succeeded by: Eleftherios Venizelos

Personal details
- Born: 5 January 1867 Patras, Kingdom of Greece
- Died: 28 November 1922 (aged 55) Goudi, Athens, Kingdom of Greece
- Cause of death: Execution by firing squad
- Party: People's Party

Dimitrios Gounaris (Greek: Δημήτριος Γούναρης; 5 January 1867 – 28 November 1922) was a Greek politician who served as the prime minister of Greece from 25 February to 10 August 1915 and 26 March 1921 to 3 May 1922. The leader of the People's Party, he was the main right-wing opponent of his contemporary Eleftherios Venizelos.

== Early life ==
He studied law at Athens University and continued his studies in Germany, France and England, before returning to his native Patras. He was elected deputy for Achaea in 1902 and distinguished himself as an orator and a member of the so-called "Japanese Group" that opposed the Georgios Theotokis government in 1906–1908. Gounaris himself, however, joined the government in 1908 as Finance Minister, hoping to implement a reformist program, thereby causing the dissolution of the group, although he was soon forced to resign. Despite his progressive views (he was an admirer of the Bismarckian German social laws), his conservative political thinking turned him into a leading opponent of Eleftherios Venizelos.

== First premiership ==
He was appointed Prime Minister after Venizelos' first resignation in 1915 by King Constantine I. For his anti-Venizelist, pro-neutrality role he was exiled with other prominent anti-Venizelists to Corsica in 1917 after Venizelos' return to power in Athens. He managed to escape to Sardinia, Italy, in 1918, but was able to return to Greece only in 1920, as to partake in the crucial November elections as the de facto leader of the "United Opposition", amidst the ongoing 1919–1922 Greco-Turkish War.

== Second premiership and war against Turkey ==
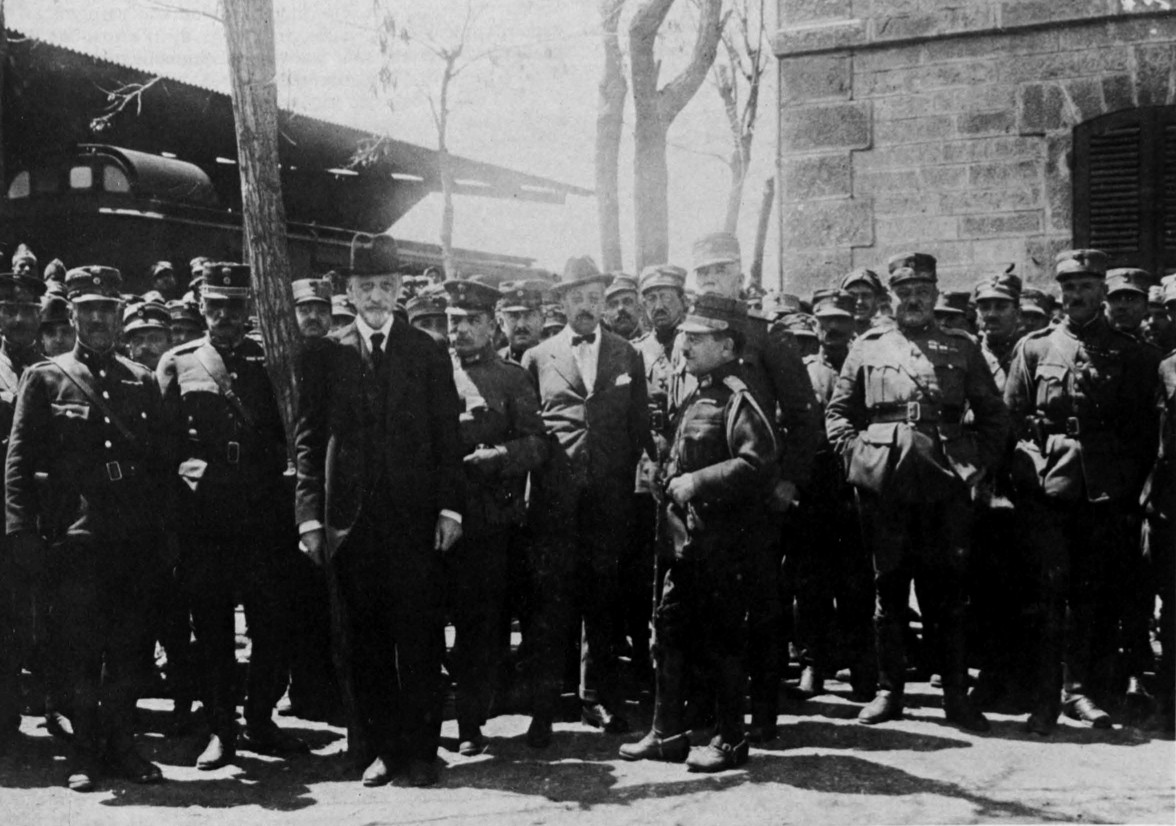
Gounaris with officers in Asia Minor, 1921

After Venizelos' defeat, Gounaris controlled most deputies in the parliament, and was the main driving force of the following royalist governments, but himself only assumed the office of Prime Minister in March 1921. Although he was willing to compromise with the Turks, as he showed in the London talks in early 1921, in order to step up pressure on the Kemalist Turks, he agreed to the launch of the Greek offensive of March 1921. The Greek Army was not prepared, and the attack was repulsed in the Second Battle of İnönü, resulting in the first Greek defeat in the Greco-Turkish War. After the successful Greek advance towards Eskişehir and Afyon in July, he urged the continuation of the advance towards Ankara, which was however stopped in the Battle of Sakarya. After the Greeks retreated to form a new front, he appealed to the Allies, and especially to the United Kingdom of Great Britain and Ireland, for assistance and mediation.

Although Gounaris threatened the British with unilateral withdrawal, his government maintained the Greek Army's positions, not being able to shoulder the political cost of abandoning Asia Minor and the many Greeks living there to Turkish reprisals. The deepening political crisis caused the fall of Gounaris' government in May 1922, after marginally surviving a vote of confidence, but the predominance of his followers in the National Assembly meant that he only exchanged the post of Prime Minister with that of Justice Minister in the government of Petros Protopapadakis.

== Trial, execution and legacy ==
After the disaster of August 1922 and the rout of the Greeks by Mustafa Kemal's forces, the remnants of the Greek Army revolted in September, and the government was deposed. The predominantly Venizelist rebels, under the leadership of Colonel Nikolaos Plastiras, formed a military tribunal to try those that were considered as responsible for the catastrophe. The so-called "Trial of the Six", convened in November 1922, found the defendants, Gounaris among them, guilty of treason. He was executed along with the others at Goudi on the same day of the verdict, on 28 November. Although Gounaris undoubtedly bears a measure of responsibility for the military and diplomatic actions that led to the Greek defeat in 1922, his trial and execution are widely perceived to be more an act of scapegoating in order to vent the anger of the people, as well as being mostly motivated by the hatred of the Venizelist faction towards him. In 2010, the Supreme Court of Greece overturned convictions of Gounaris and other defendants.

Gounaris together with some conservative politicians were the first to propose amendment to the Greek Constitution to allow women's suffrage rights. The amendment ultimately failed to pass. Gounaris was the uncle of Panagiotis Kanellopoulos.

== See also ==
- History of Modern Greece

Political offices
Preceded by Eleftherios Venizelos	Prime Minister of Greece; 25 February 1915 – 10 August 1915	Succeeded by Eleftherios Venizelos
Preceded by Nikolaos Kalogeropoulos	Prime Minister of Greece; 26 March 1921 – 3 May 1922	Succeeded by Nikolaos Stratos
