= Stylianos Gonatas =

Greek military officer and politician (1876–1966)

- Στυλιανός Γονατάς
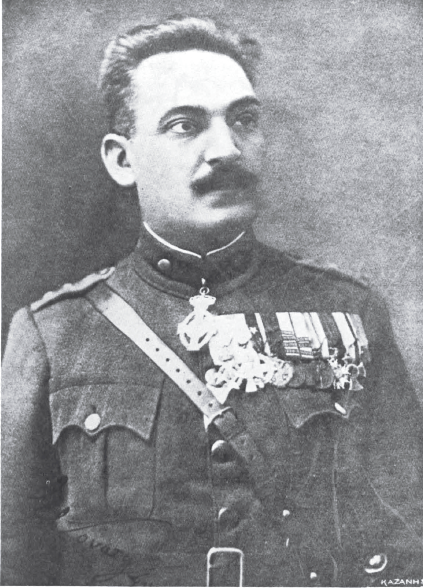
- Stylianos Gonatas c. 1922

Prime Minister of Greece
- In office 14 November 1922 – 11 January 1924
- Monarch: George II
- Regent: Pavlos Kountouriotis (from 1923)
- Preceded by: Sotirios Krokidas
- Succeeded by: Eleftherios Venizelos

President of the Hellenic Senate
- In office 4 November 1932 – 1 April 1935
- President: Alexandros Zaimis
- Preceded by: Leonidas Paraskevopoulos
- Succeeded by: Ioannis Theotokis
Ministerial offices
Minister of Transport
In office 17 February 1947 – 29 August 1947
Prime Minister	Dimitrios Maximos
Preceded by	Ioannis Bournias
Succeeded by	Panos Chatzipanos
Interim; 24 January 1947 – 27 January 1947
Prime Minister	Dimitrios Maximos
Preceded by	Dimitris Papadimitriou
Succeeded by	Ioannis Bournias
Interim; 4 April 1946 – 18 April 1946
Prime Minister	Panagiotis Poulitsas
Preceded by	Dimitrios Machas
Succeeded by	Dimitrios Papadimitriou
Minister for Public Works
In office 4 April 1946 – 29 August 1947
Prime Minister	Panagiotis Poulitsas; Konstantinos Tsaldaris; Dimitrios Maximos
Preceded by	Theodoros Chavinis (interim)
Succeeded by	Georgios Stratos (interim)
Minister of Reconstruction
Interim; 17 February 1947 – 29 August 1947
Prime Minister	Dimitrios Maximos
Preceded by	Ioannis Glavanis
Succeeded by	Georgios Stratos (interim)
In office 18 April 1946 – 27 January 1947
Prime Minister	Konstantinos Tsaldaris; Dimitrios Maximos
Preceded by	Ministry established
Succeeded by	Ioannis Glavanis
Minister of Social Welfare
Interim
In office 24 January 1947 – 27 January 1947
Prime Minister	Dimitrios Maximos
Preceded by	Michael Kotsianos
Succeeded by	Philippos Manouilides
Minister of Posts, Telegraphs and Telephones
Interim
In office 4 April 1946 – 18 April 1946
Prime Minister	Panagiotis Poulitsas
Preceded by	Dimitrios Mahas (interim)
Succeeded by	Athanasios Perrotis
Minister of Communications
In office 7 June 1929 – 16 Dececember 1929
Prime Minister	Eleftherios Venizelos
Preceded by	Antonios Christomanos
Succeeded by	Vyron Karapanagiotis
Minister of Foreign Affairs
In office 5 November 1923 – 11 January 1924
Prime Minister	Himself
Preceded by	Apostolos Alexandris
Succeeded by	Georgios Roussos
Minister of Military Affairs
In office 18 October 1923 – 3 November 1923
Prime Minister	Himself
Preceded by	Periklis Pierrakos-Mavromichalis
Succeeded by	Konstantinos Manetas
In office 24 June 1923 – 29 August 1923
Prime Minister	Himself
Preceded by	Periklis Pierrakos-Mavromichalis
Succeeded by	Periklis Pierrakos-Mavromichalis
In office 12 December 1922 – 9 January 1923
Prime Minister	Himself
Preceded by	Theodoros Pangalos
Succeeded by	Periklis Pierrakos-Mavromichalis

Personal details
- Born: 18 August 1876 Patras, Kingdom of Greece
- Died: 29 March 1966 (aged 89) Athens, Kingdom of Greece
- Resting place: First Cemetery of Athens
- Education: Hellenic Army Academy
- Awards: Order of the Redeemer; Commander of the Order of George I Cross of Valour; War Cross; Medal of Military Merit; Legion of Honour

Military service
- Allegiance: Kingdom of Greece; Second Hellenic Republic
- Branch/service: Hellenic Army
- Years of service: 1892–1922
- Rank: Lieutenant General
- Battles/wars: Macedonian Struggle; Balkan Wars; First Balkan War; Second Balkan War; World War I; Macedonian front; Russian Civil War; Allied intervention in the Russian Civil War; Southern Front; Southern Russia Intervention; Greco-Turkish War (1919–1922)

Stylianos Gonatas (Greek: Στυλιανός Γονατάς; 15 August 1876 – 29 March 1966) was an officer of the Hellenic Army, Venizelist politician, and Prime Minister of Greece from 1922 to 1924.

== Early life and education ==
Gonatas was born in Patras. He entered the Hellenic Military Academy in 1892 and graduated in 1897.

== Military career ==
As a lieutenant, he participated in the Macedonian Struggle (1907–1909), and became aide-de-camp to Colonel Nikolaos Zorbas immediately following the 1909 Goudi Revolt. He also participated in the 1912–13 Balkan Wars and in the Allied Expedition to Ukraine in 1919. Subsequently, he took part in the Asia Minor Campaign with the rank of colonel, first as a staff officer and later as divisional commander.

=== The September 1922 Revolt ===
In August 1922, the Greek Army was defeated in its Asia Minor campaign, which forced it to evacuate Anatolia in great haste. In Greece, this disaster led to a political crisis, and military revolts broke out in September amongst the evacuated troops in Thessaloniki, Chios and Lesbos, headed primarily by Venizelist officers.

The army contingents in Lesbos formed a Revolutionary Committee headed by Colonel Gonatas, which dispatched by airplane the following demands to Athens: the dismissal of the government, the dissolution of Parliament, the holding of new elections, and the abdication of King Constantine in favour of the Diadoch, Prince George. The revolutionary movement swiftly spread to other centres of old and new Greece, aided by the Fleet, which had joined their cause. The cabinet immediately resigned, and on 27 September King Constantine abdicated for the second time in the course of his career, and the Diadoch succeeded to the throne of Greece as King George II.

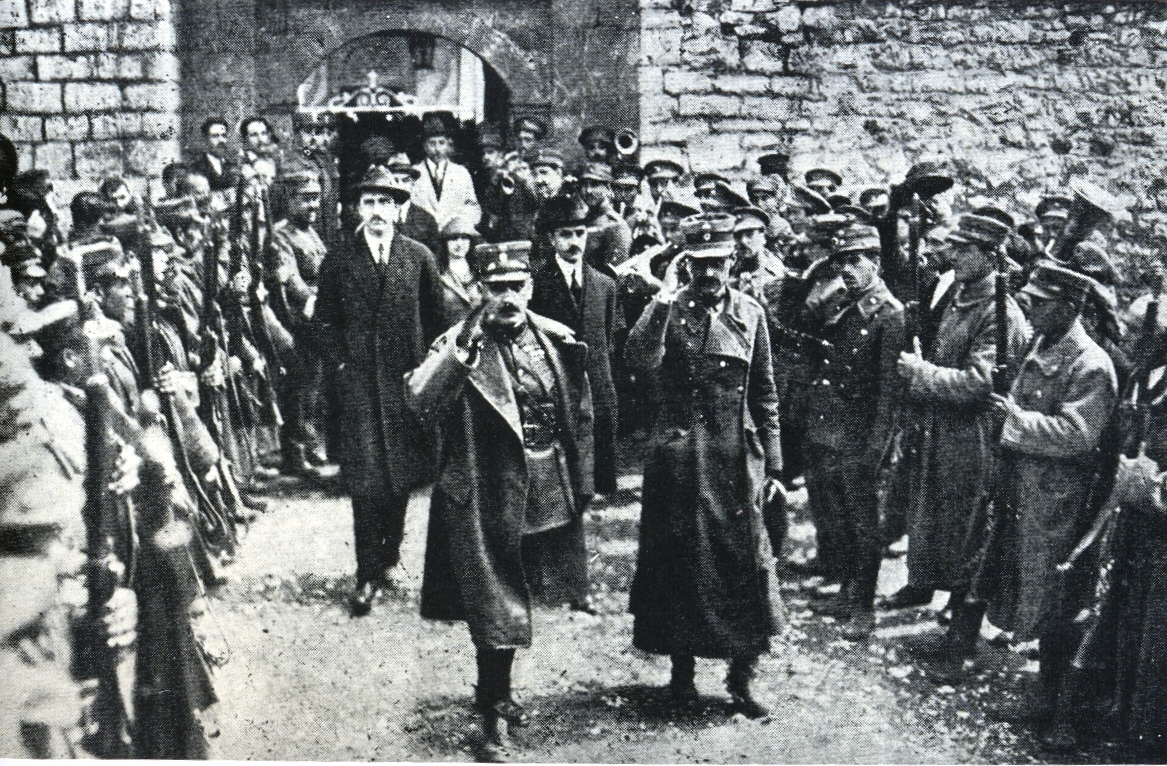
Gonatas with Plastiras and Georgios Papandreou in Ano Mousounitsa c. October 1922

On 28 September the revolutionary troops, headed by their leaders, Colonels Nikolaos Plastiras and Gonatas, entered Athens amidst wild scenes of enthusiasm. The revolutionary committee which took charge selected Alexandros Zaimis as Prime Minister, but as he was out of the country, Sotirios Krokidas was appointed interim Prime Minister.

== Prime minister ==
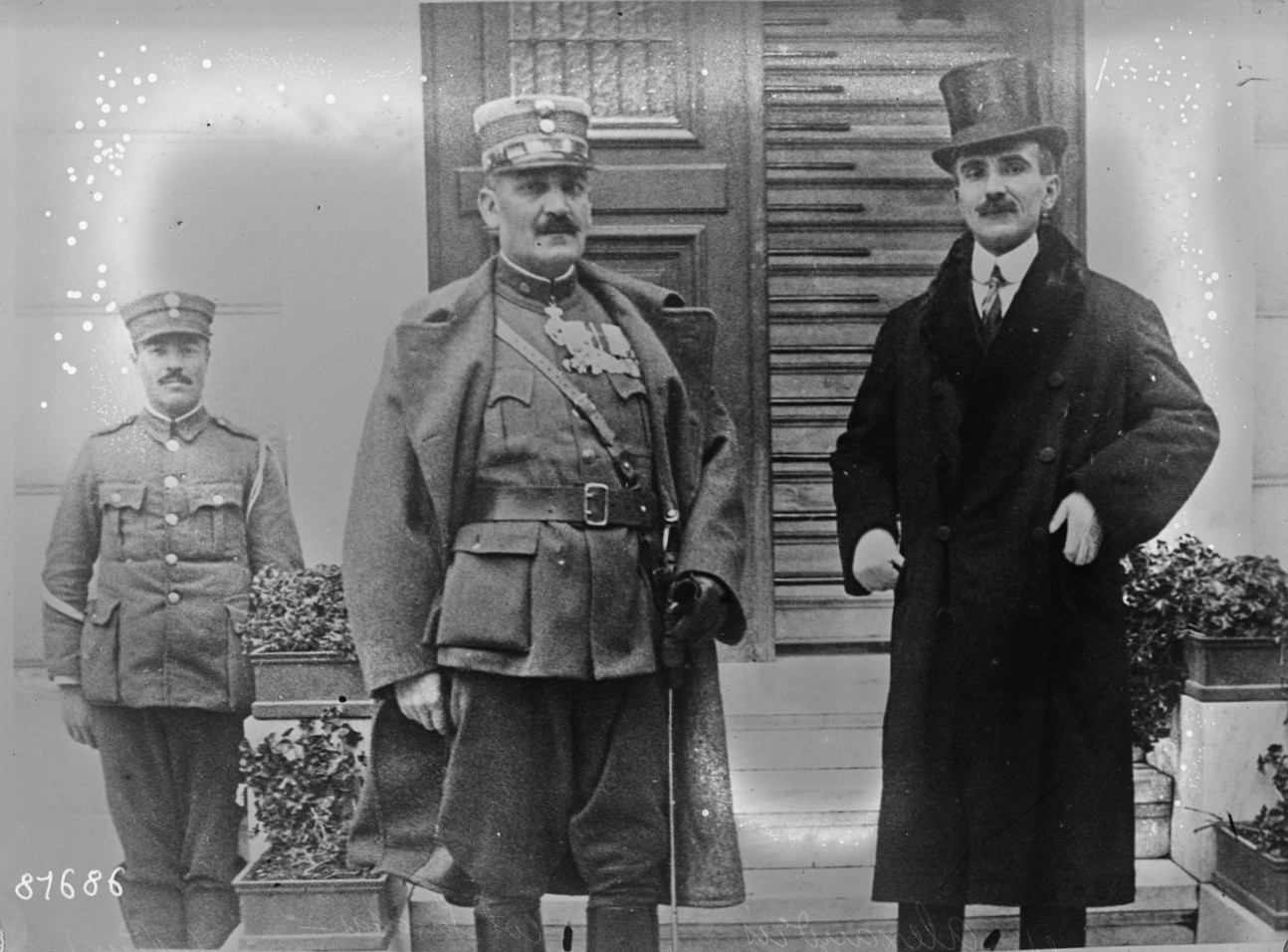
Gonatas with Foreign Minister Apostolos Alexandris, March 1923

The first cabinet formed under the regime of the Revolutionary Committee (which had established itself as the real master of Greece with King George II merely as a figurehead) underwent several slight changes, the chief of which was caused by the refusal of Zaimis to retain the premiership (which remained vacant, with Sotirios Krokidas as acting premier), and after having been in power for less than two months resigned on 24 November, chiefly owing to internal differences arising from the Trial of the Six (ex-ministers, statesmen, and military leaders tried by a revolutionary tribunal on the charges of high treason). The British government, through its minister in Athens, Lindley, urged that the accused should be treated leniently. While certain members of the cabinet were prepared to accept the British suggestion, the more irreconcilable elements refused to submit to what they considered as foreign intervention in Greek internal affairs, and the cabinet accordingly resigned. On 27 November 1922 a new cabinet, composed exclusively of members of the Revolutionary Committee and of the republican group which formed the committee's most active supporters, was appointed. Colonel Gonatas was appointed premier, and Konstantinos Rentis, one of the leaders of the republican group, as acting minister for foreign affairs (see 1922 Government Crisis).

The Gonatas government served until 11 January 1924, when it resigned in favor of fellow-liberal Eleftherios Venizelos, who had returned from exile in Paris. For his service, Gonatas was given the Grand Cross of the Order of the Redeemer. On 31 May 1924, the National Assembly promoted him and Plastiras to the rank of lieutenant general.

== Later political career ==
After his service as Prime Minister, Gonatas resigned his commission in the army. In the same year, a Republic was proclaimed and the legislature expanded to include a second house: the Senate. Gonatas ran for and was elected to the Senate as a Liberal in the 1929 election representing Attica and Boeotia. He was re-elected and later served as President of the Senate from 1932 to its dissolution in 1935.

During the Nazi Occupation of Greece, Gonatas was imprisoned in the Haidari concentration camp for four months. After the German withdrawal, Gonatas was freed and re-entered political life. When he quarrelled with Themistoklis Sophoulis, the leader of the Liberal Party, he formed his own party, the Party of National Liberals (Κόμμα Εθνικών Φιλελευθέρων) which contested the 1946 general election in coalition with the conservative People's Party. Gonatas's party elected 30 members of Parliament. Having joined forces with the monarchist party, Gonatas committed himself to support the restoration of the monarchy in the 1946 plebiscite, which restored King George II to the throne.

In the Konstantinos Tsaldaris government from 1946–1947, he served as Minister for Public Works. In the 1950 general election, Gonatas's party first allied with Napoleon Zervas's National Party of Greece but when he was discredited for his collaboration with the Nazis, Gonatas decided to run in coalition with the Liberal Party. In this election, for the first time in his political career, Gonatas was not elected.

He never sought public office again; continuing only to serve as former Prime Ministers did on the Crown Council advising the King until his death on March 29, 1966, in Athens. One of his last public appearances was in 1965, when as a former Premier he was invited to attend the Crown Council under the chairmanship of the 25-year-old King Constantine II, grandson and nephew of the two sovereigns General Gonatas had ousted some four decades earlier.

== See also ==
- Corfu incident

Political offices
Preceded by Sotirios Krokidas	Prime Minister of Greece; 1922 - 1924	Succeeded by Eleftherios Venizelos
