= Nikolaos Stratos =

Greek politician (1872–1922)

- Νικόλαος Στράτος
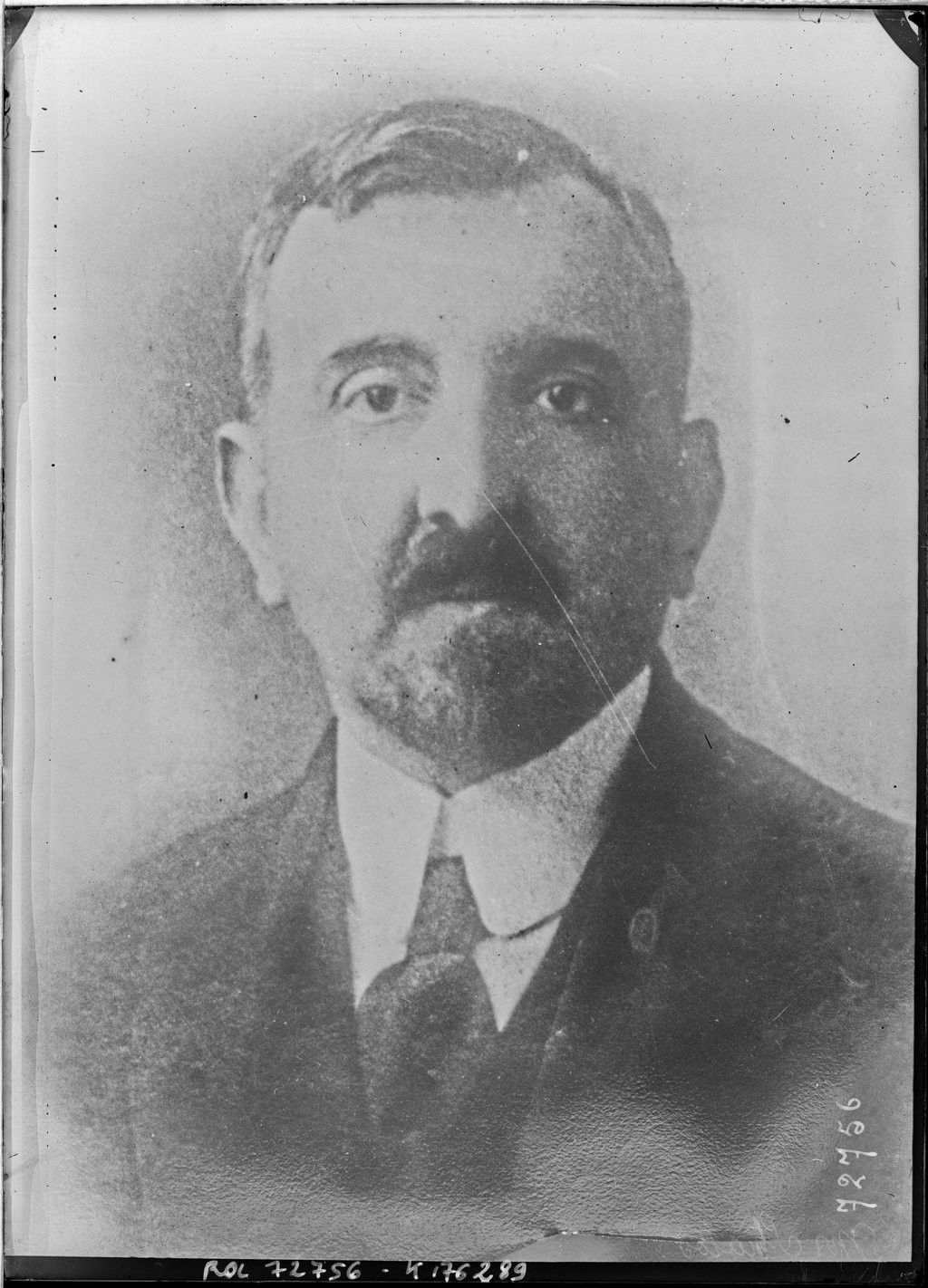

Prime Minister of Greece
- In office 3 May 1922 – 9 May 1922
- Monarch: Constantine I
- Preceded by: Dimitrios Gounaris
- Succeeded by: Petros Protopapadakis

Personal details
- Born: 16 May 1872 Loutro, Aetolia-Acarnania, Greece
- Died: 28 November 1922 (aged 50) Goudi, Athens, Greece
- Cause of death: Execution by firing squad
- Party: People's Party
- Relatives: Andreas Stratos (son); Dora Stratou (daughter)

Nikolaos Stratos (Greek: Νικόλαος Στράτος; 16 May 1872 – 28 November 1922 (15 November Old Style dating)) was a Prime Minister of Greece for a few days in May 1922. He was later tried and executed for his role in the Catastrophe of 1922.

== Early political career ==
Born in 1872 in Loutro, Aetolia-Acarnania, Stratos was first elected to Parliament in 1902. He was chosen as Interior Minister in 1909 under Kiriakoulis Mavromichalis after the Military League took power. In 1910, he joined the Liberal Party of Eleftherios Venizelos. In 1911, Stratos was elected President of the Parliament.

However, during the National Schism, he disagreed with the liberals and sided with Constantine I of Greece. In 1916, he founded the "National Conservative Party". He advocated neutrality during World War I.

== Prime minister ==
In 1922, Greece was in turmoil as the war in Asia Minor was in a stalemate after the failure of the Greek attempt to capture Ankara the previous year. When Prime Minister Dimitrios Gounaris almost lost a vote of confidence, he resigned on 3 May 1922 (O.S.) and King Constantine I asked Stratos to form a government. Stratos ultimately deferred to Petros Protopapadakis who successfully formed a government a few days later.

== Trial and execution ==
Later in 1922, Stratos, along with Gounaris, Protopapadakis and others were charged, tried and convicted for the loss of the war in Asia Minor in what was known as the Trial of the Six. Stratos was executed at Goudi on 28 November 1922. In 2010, the Supreme Court of Greece overturned convictions of Stratos and other defendants.

His son, Andreas Stratos, became a prominent politician and historian, while his daughter, Dora Stratou, became an actress and important promoter of Greek folk music and dances.

Political offices
Preceded by Dimitrios Gounaris	Prime Minister of Greece; 3–9 May 1922	Succeeded by Petros Protopapadakis
