= Petros Protopapadakis =

Greek politician

- Πέτρος Πρωτοπαπαδάκης
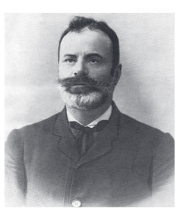
- Petros Protopapadakis

Prime Minister of Greece
- In office 9 May 1922 – 28 August 1922
- Monarch: Constantine I
- Preceded by: Nikolaos Stratos
- Succeeded by: Nikolaos Triantafyllakos

Personal details
- Born: 31 December 1860 Apeiranthos, Naxos, Greece
- Died: 28 November 1922 (aged 68) Athens, Greece
- Party: Nationalist Party, People's Party
- Occupation: Politician, Professor

Petros Protopapadakis (Greek: Πέτρος Πρωτοπαπαδάκης; 31 December 1854 – 28 November 1922) was a politician and Prime Minister of Greece from May to August 1922.

== Life and work ==
Born in 1860 in Apeiranthos, Naxos, Protopapadakis studied mathematics and engineering in Paris but was keenly interested in politics. He was a professor at the Scholi Evelpidon, the military academy of Greece.

Protopadakis was elected to the Hellenic Parliament in 1902 as a member of the conservative Nationalist Party. He later joined the People's Party and served as Minister of Economy and later, in the government of Dimitrios Gounaris, he was the Justice Minister (1921–22). In 1922, during the ill-fated Greco-Turkish War, Protopapadakis was asked to form a government by King Constantine when Gounaris resigned after almost losing a vote of confidence. Protopapadakis became Prime Minister and Gounaris the Justice Minister. Protopapadakis remained in his position for a little more than 3 months, as he was overthrown by a military coup d'état.

== Death ==
Protopapadakis was executed in the Trial of the Six proceedings at Goudi in November 1922, along with the other five most senior members of his government. In 2010, the Supreme Court of Greece overturned convictions of Protopapadakis and other defendants.

== See also ==
- History of Modern Greece

Political offices
Preceded by Nikolaos Stratos	Prime Minister of Greece; 9 May – 28 August 1922	Succeeded by Nikolaos Triantaphyllakos
