= Caretaker Cabinet of Ioannis Grivas =

Cabinet of the government of Greece in 1989

The Caretaker Cabinet of Ioannis Grivas was the Cabinet of the government of Greece for the period 12 October–23 November 1989. It was sworn in on 12 October 1989 when the government of Tzannis Tzannetakis completed its work. The outgoing chairman of the Court of Cassation, Ioannis Grivas formed a caretaker government, which conducted the Greek legislative election, November 1989. This election resulted in a hung parliament, and the Ecumenical Cabinet of Xenophon Zolotas which formed on 23 November 1989.

== Ministers ==
| Office | Incumbent | | Dates |
|---|---|---|---|
| Prime Minister | Ioannis Grivas | President of the Supreme Civil and Criminal Court of Greece | 12 October 1989 – 23 November 1989 |
| Minister for the Presidency of the Government | Nikolaos Themelis | President of the Court of Audit | 12 October 1989 – 23 November 1989 |
| Minister for National Defence | Theodoros Degiannis | ex Chief of the Hellenic National Defence General Staff | 12 October 1989 – 23 November 1989 |
| Minister for Foreign Affairs | Georgios Papoulias | former Ambassador | 12 October 1989 – 23 November 1989 |
| Minister for the Interior | Vasileios Skouris | Professor of Public Law at the University of Thessaloniki | 12 October 1989 – 23 November 1989 |
| Minister of National Economy | Giorgos Kontogeorgis | Greek European Commissioner | 12 October 1989 – 23 November 1989 |
| Minister for Finance | Georgios Agapitos | Professor of the Athens University of Economics and Business | 12 October 1989 – 23 November 1989 |
| Minister of Agriculture | Ioannis Liapis | Architect | 12 October 1989 – 23 November 1989 |
| Minister of Labour | Ioannis Koukiadis | Professor of the Law School of the Aristotle University of Thessaloniki | 12 October 1989 – 23 November 1989 |
| Minister for Health, Welfare and Social Security | Georgios Merikas | Member of the Academy of Athens | 12 October 1989 – 23 November 1989 |
| Minister for Justice | Konstantinos Stamatis | Prosecutor of the Supreme Civil and Criminal Court of Greece | 12 October 1989 – 23 November 1989 |
| Minister for National Education and Religious Affairs | Konstantinos Despotopoulos | University professor / intellectual | 12 October 1989 – 23 November 1989 |
| Minister for Culture | Georgios Mylonas | politician | 12 October 1989 – 23 November 1989 |
| Minister for Public Order | Dimitrios Manikas | Lieutenant general (retired) | 12 October 1989 – 23 November 1989 |
| Minister for Macedonia and Thrace | Ioannis Deligiannis | Former Rector of the Aristotle University of Thessaloniki | 12 October 1989 – 23 November 1989 |
| Minister for the Aegean | Antonis Foussas | Criminal attorney | 12 October 1989 – 23 November 1989 |
| Minister for the Environment, Physical Planning and Public Works | Konstantinos Liaskas | President of Technical Chamber of Greece | 12 October 1989 – 23 November 1989 |
| Minister of Industry, Energy and Technology | Pavlos Sakellaridis | Former rector of the National Technical University of Athens | 12 October 1989 – 23 November 1989 |
| Minister of Trade | Theodoros Gamaletsos | Professor of Economics at University of Piraeus | 12 October 1989 – 23 November 1989 |
| Minister for Transport and Networks | Georgios Noutsopoulos | Rector of the National Technical University of Athens | 12 October 1989 – 23 November 1989 |
| Minister for Mercantile Marine | Nikolaos Pappas | Former Chief of the Hellenic Navy General Staff | 12 October 1989 – 23 November 1989 |
| Ministry of Tourism (Greece) | Giorgos Kontogeorgis | | 12 October 1989 – 23 November 1989 |
