= Gontikas =

Gontikas is a surname. Notable people with the surname include:

- Costis Gontikas (born 1994), Greek basketball player
- Dimitrios Gontikas (1888–1967), Greek politician
- Kostis Gontikas (1934–2024), Greek politician
