= Coalition Cabinet of Xenophon Zolotas =

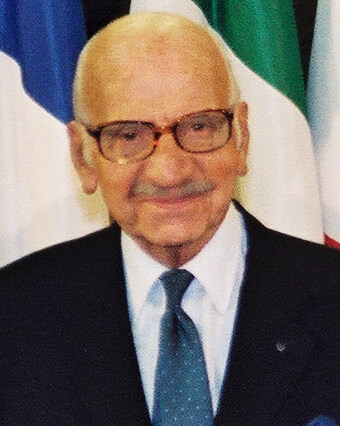
Xenophon Zolotas in 1989

The Coalition Cabinet of Xenophon Zolotas was sworn in on 23 November 1989, when the November 1989 Greek legislative election resulted in a hung parliament. After an agreement between the three biggest parties, New Democracy, Panhellenic Socialist Movement and Coalition of the Left and Progress, a coalition government of national unity or "oecumenical government" (οικουμενική κυβέρνηση) was formed under Xenophon Zolotas, the former governor of the Bank of Greece, which replaced the previous caretaker government of Ioannis Grivas. Zolotas reshuffled the cabinet on 13 February 1990.

When the government completed its work on 8 April 1990, elections were held under the electoral law passed by the Papandreou government.

== First Cabinet ==
Office	Incumbent	Party	Dates
Prime Minister	Xenophon Zolotas	Independent	23 November 1989 – 11 April 1990
Minister for the Presidency of the Government	Nikolaos Themelis	Independent	23 November 1989 – 11 April 1990
Minister for National Defence	Tzannis Tzannetakis	New Democracy	23 November 1989 – 13 February 1990
Minister for Foreign Affairs	Antonis Samaras	New Democracy	23 November 1989 – 16 February 1990
Minister for the Interior	Theodoros Katrivanos	Coalition of the Left and Progress	23 November 1989 – 11 April 1990
Minister of National Economy	Georgios Gennimatas	Panhellenic Socialist Movement	23 November 1989 – 13 February 1990
Minister for Finance	Georgios Souflias	New Democracy	23 November 1989 – 13 February 1990
Minister of Agriculture	Stavros Dimas	New Democracy	23 November 1989 – 13 February 1990
Minister of Labour	Apostolos Kaklamanis	Panhellenic Socialist Movement	23 November 1989 – 13 February 1990
Minister for Health, Welfare and Social Security	Georgios Merikas	Independent	23 November 1989 – 11 April 1990
Minister for Justice	Konstantinos Stamatis	Independent	23 November 1989 – 11 April 1990
Minister for National Education and Religious Affairs	Costas Simitis	Panhellenic Socialist Movement	23 November 1989 – 13 February 1990
Minister for Culture	Sotiris Kouvelas	New Democracy	23 November 1989 – 13 February 1990
Minister for Public Order	Dimitrios Manikas	Independent	23 November 1989 – 11 April 1990
Minister for Macedonia and Thrace	Ioannis Deligiannis	New Democracy	23 November 1989 – 11 April 1990
Minister for the Aegean	Antonis Foussas	New Democracy	23 November 1989 – 11 April 1990
Minister for the Environment, Physical Planning and Public Works	Konstantinos Liaskas	Independent	23 November 1989 – 11 April 1990
Minister of Industry, Energy and Technology	Anastasios Peponis	Panhellenic Socialist Movement	23 November 1989 – 13 February 1990
Minister of Trade	Ioannis Varvitsiotis	New Democracy	23 November 1989 – 13 February 1990
Minister for Transport and Networks	Akis Tsochatzopoulos	Panhellenic Socialist Movement	23 November 1989 – 13 February 1990
Minister for Mercantile Marine	Nikolaos Pappas	Independent	23 November 1989 – 11 April 1990
Minister for Tourism	Tzannis Tzannetakis	New Democracy	23 November 1989 – 11 April 1990
Alternate Minister for National Defence	Karolos Papoulias	Panhellenic Socialist Movement	23 November 1989 – 13 February 1990
Alternate Minister for Foreign Affairs	Ioannis Pottakis	Panhellenic Socialist Movement	23 November 1989 – 13 February 1990
Alternate Minister of National Economy	Giannis Dragasakis	Coalition of the Left and Progress	23 November 1989 – 13 February 1990
Alternate Minister for National Education and Religious Affairs	Vassilis Kondogiannopoulos	New Democracy	23 November 1989 – 13 February 1990
Alternate Minister of Industry, Energy and Technology	Grigoris Giannaros	Coalition of the Left and Progress	23 November 1989 – 13 February 1990
Alternate Minister for Transport and Networks	Ioannis Kefalogiannis	New Democracy	23 November 1989 – 13 February 1990

== Second Cabinet ==
Office	Incumbent	Party	Dates
Prime Minister	Xenophon Zolotas	Independent	23 November 1989 – 11 April 1990
Minister for the Presidency of the Government	Nikolaos Themelis	Independent	23 November 1989 – 11 April 1990
Minister for National Defence	Theodoros Degiannis	Independent	13 February 1990 – 11 April 1990
Minister for Foreign Affairs	Georgios Papoulias	Independent	16 February 1990 – 11 April 1990
Minister for the Interior	Theodoros Katrivanos	Coalition of the Left and Progress	23 November 1989 – 11 April 1990
Minister of National Economy	Giorgos Kontogeorgis	New Democracy	13 February 1990 – 11 April 1990
Minister for Finance	Georgios Agapitos	Independent	13 February 1990 – 11 April 1990
Minister of Agriculture	Ioannis Liapis	Independent	13 February 1990 – 11 April 1990
Minister of Labour	Ioannis Koukiadis	Panhellenic Socialist Movement	13 February 1990 – 11 April 1990
Minister for Health, Welfare and Social Security	Georgios Merikas	Independent	23 November 1989 – 11 April 1990
Minister for Justice	Konstantinos Stamatis	Independent	23 November 1989 – 11 April 1990
Minister for National Education and Religious Affairs	Konstantinos Despotopoulos	Independent, proposed by Synaspismos	13 February 1990 – 11 April 1990
Minister for Culture	Georgios Mylonas	Coalition of the Left and Progress	13 February 1990 – 11 April 1990
Minister for Public Order	Dimitrios Manikas	Independent	23 November 1989 – 11 April 1990
Minister for Macedonia and Thrace	Ioannis Deligiannis	New Democracy	23 November 1989 – 11 April 1990
Minister for the Aegean	Antonis Foussas	New Democracy	23 November 1989 – 11 April 1990
Minister for the Environment, Physical Planning and Public Works	Konstantinos Liaskas	Independent	23 November 1989 – 11 April 1990
Minister of Industry, Energy and Technology	Pavlos Sakellaridis	Independent	13 February 1990 – 11 April 1990
Minister of Trade	Theodoros Gamaletsos	Independent	13 February 1990 – 11 April 1990
Minister for Transport and Networks	Georgios Noutsopoulos	Independent	13 February 1990 – 11 April 1990
Minister for Mercantile Marine	Nikolaos Pappas	Independent	23 November 1989 – 11 April 1990
Minister for Tourism	Tzannis Tzannetakis	New Democracy	23 November 1989 – 11 April 1990
