= Manetas =

Manetas or Manettas (Μανέτας/Μανέττας) is a Greek surname, common in Arcadia. It can refer to:

- Panagiotis Manetas (1837–1908), Greek politician
- Ioannis Manetas (1878–1943), Greek politician
- Konstantinos Manetas (1879–1960), Greek general and politician
- Theodoros Manetas (1881–1947), Greek general and politician
- Miltos Manetas (born 1964), Greek painter
