= List of defence ministers of Greece =

This is a list of Greek war and defence ministers.

== List of ministers ==
=== Military affairs, 1899–1946 ===
#	Name	Took office	Left office	Notes
	Colonel Konstantinos Koumoundouros	14 April 1899	11 January 1900	
	Nikolaos Tsamados	11 January 1900	14 November 1901	
	Georgios Korpas	25 November 1901	6 December 1902	
	Colonel Lymbrittis	7 December 1902	27 June 1903	
	Alexios Grivas	28 June 1903	11 July 1903	
	Ioannis Konstantinidis	11 July 1903	19 December 1903	
	Major General Konstantinos Smolenskis	19 December 1903	29 December 1904	
	Kyriakos Mavromichalis	29 December 1904	30 July 1905	
	Vasileios Voudouris	30 July 1905	21 December 1905	
	Georgios Theotokis	21 December 1905	29 July 1909	
	Colonel Emmanouil Manousogiannakis	29 July 1909	28 August 1909	
	Leonidas Lapathiotis	31 August 1909	30 December 1909	
	Ioannis Konstantinidis	30 December 1909	31 January 1910	
	Nikolaos Zorbas	31 January 1910	18 October 1910	
	Eleftherios Venizelos	18 October 1910	10 March 1915	Also Prime Minister
	Dimitrios Gounaris	10 March 1915	23 August 1915	Also Prime Minister
	Lt. General Panagiotis Danglis	23 August 1915	7 October 1915	
	Ioannis Giannakitsas	7 October 1915	7 November 1915	
	Major General Konstantinos Kallaris	22 June 1916	16 September 1916	
	Nikolaos Kalogeropoulos	16 September 1916	9 October 1916	
	Nikolaos Drakos	10 October 1916	27 June 1917	
	Eleftherios Venizelos	27 June 1917	18 November 1920	Also Prime Minister
	Dimitrios Gounaris	18 November 1920	8 April 1921	
	Nikolaos Theotokis	8 April 1921	16 May 1922	
	Nikolaos Stratos	16 May 1922	22 May 1922	
	Nikolaos Theotokis	22 May 1922	9 September 1922	
	Nikolaos Triantafyllakos	10 September 1922	16 September 1922	Also Prime Minister
	Anastasios Charalambis	16 September 1922	14 November 1922	Also Prime Minister until 17 September 1922
	Major General Theodoros Pangalos	14 November 1922	12 December 1922	
	Colonel Stylianos Gonatas	12 December 1922	9 January 1923	Prime Minister, minister pro tempore
	Periklis Pierrakos-Mavromichalis	9 January 1923	24 June 1923	
	Colonel Stylianos Gonatas	24 June 1923	29 August 1923	Also Prime Minister
	Periklis Pierrakos-Mavromichalis	29 August 1923	18 October 1923	
	Colonel Stylianos Gonatas	18 October 1923	3 November 1923	Prime Minister, minister pro tempore
	Major General Konstantinos Manetas	3 November 1923	11 January 1924	
	Konstantinos Gondikas	11 January 1924	12 March 1924	
	Georgios Kondylis	12 March 1924	11 June 1924	
	Theodoros Pangalos	11 June 1924	24 July 1924	
	Georgios Katechakis	24 July 1924	9 March 1925	
	Konstantinos Gondikas	9 March 1925	26 June 1925	
	Theodoros Pangalos	26 June 1925	21 April 1926	Dictator, concurrently Prime Minister
	Charalambos Tseroulis	21 April 1926	22 August 1926	
	Georgios Kondylis	26 August 1926	4 December 1926	Leader of the uprising that deposed Pangalos, concurrently Prime Minister
	Alexandros Mazarakis-Ainian	4 December 1926	4 July 1928	
	Themistoklis Sofoulis	4 July 1928	11 November 1930	
	Eleftherios Venizelos	11 November 1930	23 December 1930	Also Prime Minister
	Georgios Katechakis	23 December 1930	26 May 1932	
	Alexandros Papanastasiou	26 May 1932	3 June 1932	
	Theodoros Chavinis	5 June 1932	31 October 1932	
	Georgios Kondylis	3 November 1932	13 January 1933	
	Georgios Katechakis	16 January 1933	6 March 1933	
	Alexandros Othonaios	6 March 1933	8 March 1933	
	Georgios Kondylis	10 March 1933	20 March 1935	
	Ioannis Metaxas	5 March 1935	13 March 1935	
	Georgios Kondylis	20 March 1935	10 October 1935	
	Major General Alexandros Papagos	10 October 1935	25 November 1935	
	Konstantinos Demertzis	30 November 1935	5 March 1935	
	Ioannis Metaxas	14 March 1936	29 January 1941	
	Alexandros Koryzis	29 January 1941	18 April 1941	
	Theodoros Panagakos	21 April 1941	2 June 1941	
	Georgios Bakos	30 April 1941	7 April 1943	As part of the Axis collaborationist regime
	Stylianos Dimitrikakis	2 June 1941	4 May 1942	
	Panagiotis Kanellopoulos	4 May 1942	16 March 1943	
	Vyron Karapanagiotis	16 March 1943	3 April 1944	
	Sofoklis Venizelos	13 April 1944	23 April 1944	
	Georgios Papandreou	28 May 1944	31 December 1944	
	Nikolaos Plastiras	3 January 1945	7 April 1945	
	Vice Admiral Petros Voulgaris	9 April 1945	11 August 1945	
	Alexandros Merentitis	11 August 1945	1 November 1945	
	Spyridon Georgoulis	1 November 1945	20 November 1945	
	Theodoros Manetas	22 November 1945	4 April 1946	

=== Military affairs, naval affairs & aviation, 1946 ===
#	Name	Took office	Left office	Party
	Petros K. Mavromichalis	4 April 1946	3 November 1946	People's Party

=== Military affairs, 1946–1950 ===
#	Name	Took office	Left office	Party
	Philippos Dragoumis	4 November 1946	24 January 1947	People's Party
	Georgios Stratos	27 January 1947	12 November 1948	People's Party
	Konstantinos Rendis	18 November 1948	19 January 1949	Liberal Party
	Panayotis Kanellopoulos	20 January 1949	6 January 1950	National Unionist Party

=== Military affairs, naval affairs & aviation, 1950 ===
#	Name	Took office	Left office	Party
	Ioannis Theotokis	7 January 1950	23 March 1950	
	Panagiotis Kanellopoulos	23 March 1950	15 April 1950	National Unionist Party

=== National defence, 1950–present ===
#	Name	Took office	Left office	Party
	Philippos Manouilidis	15 April 1950	18 August 1950	Democratic Socialist Party
	Sofoklis Venizelos	21 August 1950	28 August 1950	Liberal Party
	Konstantinos Rendis	28 August 1950	13 September 1950	Liberal Party
	Konstantinos Karamanlis	13 September 1950	2 November 1950	People's Party
	General (ret.) Panagiotis Spiliotopoulos	30 July 1951	27 October 1951	Former Chief of the Army General Staff
	Admiral (ret.) Alexandros Sakellariou	27 October 1951	28 March 1952	Former Chief of the Navy General Staff
	Sofoklis Venizelos	10 April 1952	24 July 1952	Liberal Party
	Georgios Mavros	24 July 1952	11 October 1952	Liberal Party
	Lt. General (ret.) Ioannis Pitsikas	11 October 1952	18 November 1952	
	Marshal (ret.) Alexandros Papagos	23 November 1952	2 December 1952	Greek Rally, former Commander-in-Chief of the Greek military
	Panagiotis Kanellopoulos	2 December 1952	6 June 1955	Greek Rally
	Konstantinos Karamanlis	6 October 1955	10 January 1956	Greek Rally
	Sotirios Stergiopoulos	11 January 1956	27 February 1956	
	Aristeidis Protopapadakis	29 February 1956	2 March 1958	National Radical Union
	Sotirios Stergiopoulos	5 March 1958	17 May 1958	
	Konstantinos Karamanlis	17 May 1958	20 September 1961	National Radical Union
	Air Vice Marshal (ret.) Charalambos Potamianos	20 September 1961	4 November 1961	
	Aristeidis Protopapadakis	4 November 1961	11 June 1963	National Radical Union
	Philippos Dragoumis	19 June 1963	28 September 1963	
	Dimitrios Papanikolopoulos	29 September 1963	18 February 1964	
	Petros Garoufalias	18 February 1964	15 July 1965	Center Union
	Stavros Kostopoulos	15 July 1965	21 December 1966	Center Union; Dissident Center Union; Liberal Democratic Center
	Ioannis Paraskevopoulos	22 December 1966	30 March 1967	
	Panagiotis Papaligouras	3 April 1967	21 April 1967	National Radical Union
	Lt. General Grigorios Spandidakis	21 April 1967	13 December 1967	Military regime
	Colonel (Ret.) Georgios Papadopoulos	13 December 1967	8 October 1973	Military regime
	Nikolaos Efessios	8 October 1973	25 November 1973	Military regime
	Efstathios Latsoudis	25 November 1973	24 July 1974	Military regime
	Evangelos Averoff	26 July 1974	19 October 1981	National Radical Union (1974); New Democracy (1974–81)
	Andreas Papandreou	21 October 1981	25 April 1986	Panhellenic Socialist Movement
	Colonel (ret.) Ioannis Charalambopoulos	25 April 1986	1 July 1989	Panhellenic Socialist Movement
	Ioannis Varvitsiotis	2 July 1989	7 October 1989	New Democracy
	Theodoros Degiannis	12 October 1989	23 November 1989	
	Tzannis Tzannetakis	23 November 1989	12 February 1990	New Democracy
	Theodoros Degiannis	13 February 1990	11 April 1990	
	Ioannis Varvitsiotis	11 April 1990	13 October 1993	New Democracy
	Gerasimos Arsenis	13 October 1993	24 September 1996	Panhellenic Socialist Movement
	Akis Tsochatzopoulos	24 September 1996	23 October 2001	Panhellenic Socialist Movement
	Yiannos Papantoniou	23 October 2001	10 March 2004	Panhellenic Socialist Movement
	Spilios Spiliotopoulos	10 March 2004	15 February 2006	New Democracy
	Evaggelos Meimarakis	15 February 2006	7 October 2009	New Democracy
	Evangelos Venizelos	7 October 2009	17 June 2011	Panhellenic Socialist Movement
	Panos Beglitis	17 June 2011	11 November 2011	Panhellenic Socialist Movement
	Dimitris Avramopoulos	11 November 2011	17 May 2012	New Democracy
	General (ret.) Frangoulis Frangos	17 May 2012	21 June 2012	Independent, former Chief of Army General Staff
	Panos Panagiotopoulos	21 June 2012	25 June 2013	New Democracy
	Dimitris Avramopoulos	25 June 2013	3 November 2014	New Democracy
	Nikos Dendias	3 November 2014	27 January 2015	New Democracy
	Panos Kammenos	27 January 2015	28 August 2015	Independent Greeks
	Air Chief Marshal (ret.) Ioannis Giagkos	28 August 2015	23 September 2015	Independent, former Chief of the National Defence General Staff
	Panos Kammenos	23 September 2015	13 January 2019	Independent Greeks
	Admiral (ret.) Evangelos Apostolakis	14 January 2019	9 July 2019	Independent, previously Chief of the National Defence General Staff
	Nikos Panagiotopoulos	9 July 2019	Incumbent	New Democracy
