= Giannaros =

Giannaros is a surname. Notable people with the surname include:

- Demetrios Giannaros (born 1949), American politician
- Grigoris Giannaros (1936–1997), Greek politician and journalist
- James Giannaros (born 1952), Australian snooker player
- Spyridon Giannaros (born 1992), Greek competitive rower
