= Argyrokastro =

Argyrokastro (Greek: Αργυρόκαστρο Silver Castle) may refer to:

- Argyrokastro Castle, castle in the region of the Peloponnese, Greece
- Argyrokastro, the Greek name of Gjirokastër, a city in southern Albania
- Argyrokastro Castle, or Gjirokastër Castle, a castle in Gjirokastër, southern Albania
