= Ilias Degiannis =

Greek naval officer and resistance leader (1912–1943)

Ilias Degiannis (Greek: Ηλίας Ντεγιάννης; 22 December 1912 – 18 June 1943) was a Greek navy officer Resistance leader during the Axis occupation of Greece.

Degiannis had participated in the abortive pro-Republican coup attempt of March 1935, and been dismissed from the navy as a result.

He was one of a number of pro-Liberal or left-wing Greeks contacted and recruited by Section D of British intelligence in early 1941, forming an intelligence cell called "Prometheus" (Προμηθεύς) under the leadership of Colonel Evripidis Bakirtzis. Due to the German invasion of Greece and the rapid conquest of the country in April–May 1941, the British were not able to organize their clandestine network on a firm basis or provide them with suitable material such as radios. Following the British withdrawal, only the Prometheus group used its transmitter to send information to SOE in Cairo.

In early 1942, Bakirtzis was forced to leave Greece because his identity had been revealed to the Germans. Degiannis, along with fellow participants in the 1935 coup Charalambos Koutsogiannopoulos and Dimitris Bardopoulos, was left in charge of the group which was reorganized as "Prometheus II". The group collected intelligence for the SOE and engaged in a successful sabotage campaign against Axis shipping.

He was arrested, tortured and executed by the Germans on 18 June 1943. He was promoted posthumously to Commander.

In December 1980 the Hellenic Navy commissioned the La Combattante IIIb-class fast attack craft Ypoploiarchos Degiannis (P 26) in his honour.

His brother Theodoros Degiannis became an admiral and chief of the Hellenic National Defence General Staff in 1982–1984, while another brother Ioannis Degiannis became a senior judge, presiding over the Greek Junta Trials.

== Sources ==
- Gerolymatos, André (1992). British Intelligence and Guerrilla Warfare Operations in the Second World War: Greece 1941-1944, A Case Study (PhD thesis). McGill University.
