= Panagakos =

Panagakos (Greek: Παναγάκος) is a Greek surname that is commonly derived from Mani, Greece. In Greek, its literal translation means 'front – lead', however the interpretation of the entire surname is 'lead from the front'. There is no record to point to the origins of the surname but, taking into account the definition of the two words 'front' and 'lead' it is likely the surname has military significance or something representing authority.

== Variations ==
Directly transcribing "Παναγάκος" from Greek into English means Panagakos is the conventional form. However other variations such as Panagacis, Panagacos and Panagakis also exist due to subjective interpretation of the spelling from Greek into English.

== Surname localities ==
Many families with the surname Panagakos (or its variations) can be found in the United States and Australia. Records show a number of families with the surname existed in the United States sometime after 1920. But there was also a wave of emigration from Sparta during the late 1800s and it is possible that families with the surname Panagakos were a part of the departure. Although, outside of Greece, the surname is most commonly found in the United States, it is likely those with the surname in Australia arrived in the country at the conclusion of World War II.

== Known people with the surname Panagakos ==
- Theodoros Panagakos, Minister for War (21 April 1941 – 2 June 1941)
