= Varvitsiotis =

Varvitsiotis is a surname. Notable people with the surname include:

- Ioannis Varvitsiotis (1933–2026), Greek politician
- Miltiadis Varvitsiotis, Greek politician and attorney
