= Magouliana =

Magouliana Μαγούλιανα
- Community
- Location within Greece
- Coordinates: 37°41′N 22°8′E
- Country: Greece
- Administrative region: Peloponnese
- Regional unit: Arcadia
- Municipality: Gortynia
- Municipal unit: Vytina

Population (2021)
  - Community: 128
- Time zone: UTC+2 (EET)
  - Summer (DST): UTC+3 (EEST)

Magouliana (Greek: Μαγούλιανα) is a mountain village and a community in the municipal unit of Vytina, Arcadia, Greece. The community includes the small village Pan. It sits at 1,365 m above sea level, under the ruined Argyrokastro Castle. Magouliana is 3 km southwest of Lasta, 5 km west of Vytina and 12 km northeast of Dimitsana. It is considered a traditional settlement.

== Population ==
Year	Population village	Population community
1815	1,250	–
1851	2,342	–
1861	554	–
1896	902	–
1907	889	–
1920	635	–
1928	796	–
1940	844	–
1950	604	–
1961	471	–
1971	319	–
1981	335	–
1991	257	–
2001	238	256
2011	117	119
2021	118	128

== Geography and history ==
According to several sources, the village was founded between 1530 and 1600 by inhabitants of five settlements, Agios Athanasios (Kastro), Agios Konstantinos (Leivadi), Agios Ioannis (Kampeas), Petrovouni and Megisti or Katsipodas, fleeing from raiding Lalaioi Turks. According to Max Vasmer, the name might derive from the Slavic word Mogyljane ("hill people"). The word is also related to the modern Greek μαγούλα (magoula, of Slavic or Albanian origin) which means hill or small mound. It was renamed to Argyrokastro in 1927, but it was renamed back to Magouliana in 1929.

== People ==
- Konstantinos Gontikas, politician, minister
- Dimitrios Gontikas, politician, president of the parliament
- Andrew Jarvis, Greek-American politician

== See also ==
- List of settlements in Arcadia
- List of traditional settlements of Greece
