= Theodoros Manetas =

Greek Lieutenant General

- Θεόδωρος Μανέτας
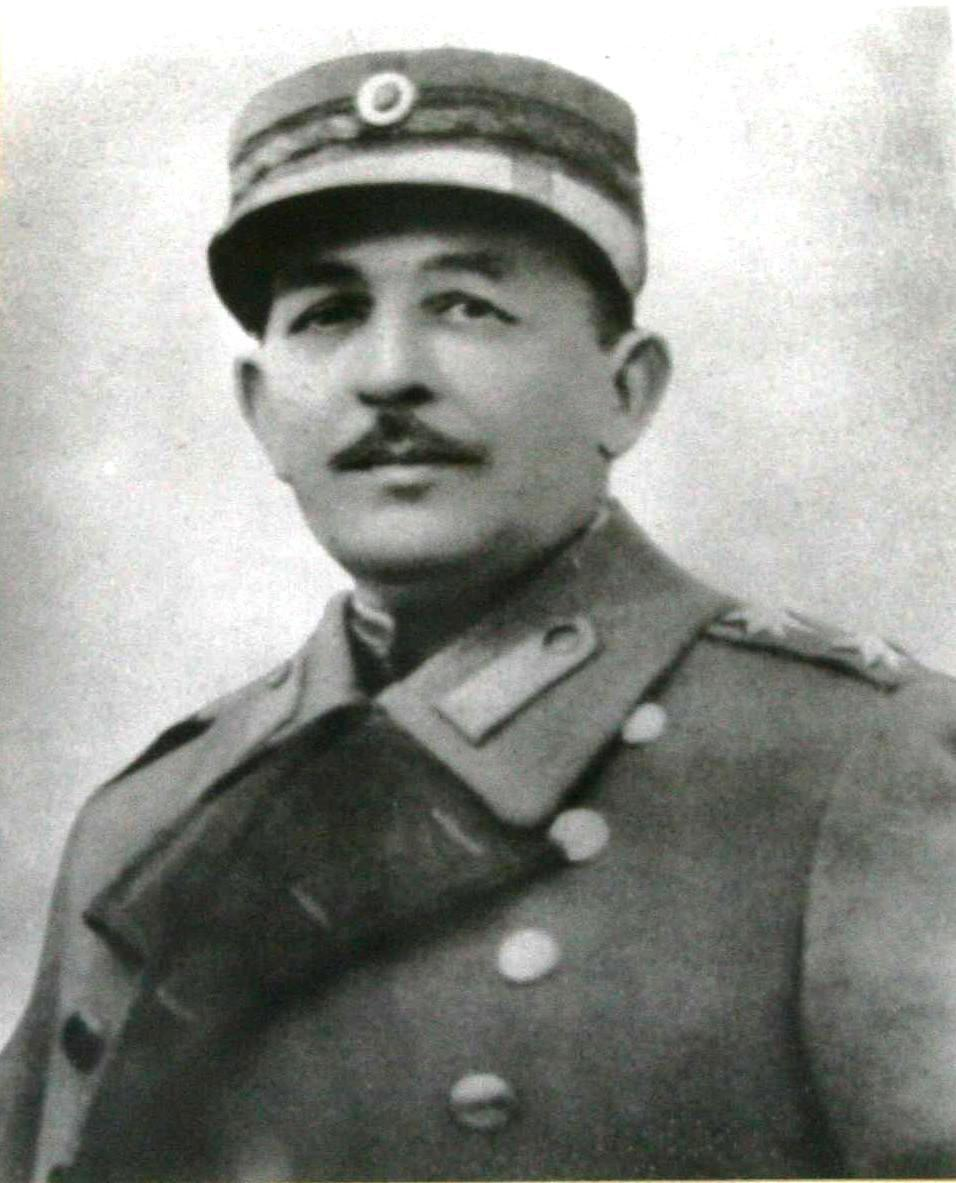
- Theodoros Manetas c. 1930

Member of Parliament for Arcadia
- In office 18 April 1946 – 24 January 1947
- Monarch: George II
- Prime Minister: Konstantinos Tsaldaris

Minister of Military Affairs
- In office 22 November 1945 – 4 April 1946
- Monarch: George II
- Prime Minister: Themistoklis Sofoulis
- Preceded by: Spyridon Georgoulis
- Succeeded by: Petros K. Mavromichalis

Minister of Aviation
- In office 22 – 26 November 1945
- Monarch: George II
- Prime Minister: Themistoklis Sofoulis

Minister Governor-General of Northern Greece
- In office 21 March – 16 April 1945
- Monarch: George II
- Prime Minister: Nikolaos Plastiras; Petros Voulgaris
- Preceded by: Alexandros Rangavis
- Succeeded by: Alexandros Merentitis

Personal details
- Born: 1881 Tripoli, Kingdom of Greece
- Died: 1947 (aged 65–66) Athens, Kingdom of Greece
- Party: Liberal Party
- Relations: Konstantinos Kolokotronis (great-great-grandfather); Lambros Tzavelas (great-great-grandfather); Theodoros Kolokotronis (great-grandfather); Ioannis Kolokotronis (grandfather); Photini Tzavela (grandmother); Panos Kolokotronis (great-uncle); Kitsos Tzavellas (great-uncle); Nikitas Stamatelopoulos (great-uncle); Zoe Maneta (sister); Konstantinos Manetas (brother); Ioannis Manetas (brother)
- Parent(s): Panagiotis Manetas; Zoe Kolokotroni
- Education: Hellenic Army Academy

Military service
- Allegiance: Kingdom of Greece; Provisional Government of National Defence; Second Hellenic Republic
- Branch/service: Hellenic Army
- Years of service: 1902–1920; 1922–1925; 1926–1935
- Rank: Lieutenant General
- Commands: Chief of the Hellenic Army General Staff
- Battles/wars: Balkan Wars; First Balkan War; Second Balkan War; World War I; Macedonian front; Battle of Doiran; 1935 Greek coup d'état attempt

Theodoros Manetas (Greek: Θεόδωρος Μανέτας, c. 1881–1947) was a Hellenic Army officer who rose to the rank of lieutenant general and served as Chief of the Hellenic Army General Staff in 1931–1933. He also served thrice in ministerial positions and was elected to parliament in 1946.

== Military career ==
He was born in Tripoli in about 1881, the son of the politician Panagiotis Manetas, the youngest brother of Lieutenant General Konstantinos Manetas and of the politician Ioannis Manetas.

After finishing school, he enrolled in the Hellenic Army Academy and graduated on 6 July 1902 as an Artillery Second Lieutenant. He was promoted to lieutenant in 1909, and spent the period 1910–1912 studying in France. He returned to take part in the Balkan Wars of 1912–1913 as a battery commander, and was promoted to captain in 1913 and major in 1915.

During World War I, he joined the Venizelist Movement of National Defence and fought in the Macedonian front leading artillery battalions and regiments. In 1917 he was promoted to Lt. Colonel and assigned as head of the Personnel Department in the Ministry of Military Affairs. In 1918 he was reassigned to the front, assuming the post of artillery chief of the Cretan Division and taking part in the Battle of Doiran.

In 1919 he was promoted to full colonel, but was dismissed from the Army in November 1920 following the Venizelist electoral defeat. After the disastrous defeat of the Greek army in Anatolia by the Turkish nationalist forces in August 1922 and the subsequent outbreak of a military revolt, he was recalled to active service by the new revolutionary government and named Inspector of Artillery. Promoted to major general in 1924, he quarrelled with the dictator Theodoros Pangalos in 1925 and resigned, only to be recalled to his post soon after.

On 27 October 1928 he was named Vice-Minister of Military Affairs in Eleftherios Venizelos' cabinet, a post he held until 9 June 1929. Promoted to lieutenant general, he was then given command of II Army Corps. In August 1931, he was appointed Chief of the Army General Staff, remaining at this post until 15 July 1933, when he re-assumed command of II Corps. He was involved in the unsuccessful Venizelist coup attempt in March 1935 and was dismissed from the Army on 30 April, following the coup's suppression.

== Political career ==
Following the liberation of Greece from the Axis occupation, on 21 March 1945 Manetas was appointed Minister Governor-General for Northern Greece in the Nikolaos Plastiras cabinet, a post he held until 16 April, a few days into the Petros Voulgaris cabinet. He then held the post of Minister of Military Affairs in the Themistoklis Sofoulis cabinet, from 22 November 1945 until 4 April 1946, and was pro tempore also Minister of Aviation in 22–26 November. Manetas elected to the Hellenic Parliament in the March 1946 elections on the Liberal Party ticket for his home province of Arcadia, holding the seat until his death in 1947.

Political offices
Preceded by Spyridon Georgoulis	Minister for Military Affairs of Greece; 22 November 1945 – 4 April 1946	Succeeded by Petros K. Mavromichalis
Vacant Axis Occupation Title last held by Alexandros Rangavis as Minister Governor-General for Macedonia in the Georgios Tsolakoglou cabinet	Minister Governor-General for Northern Greece; 21 March – 16 April 1945	Succeeded by Alexandros Merentitis
Military offices
Preceded by Lt General Konstantinos Manetas	Chief of the Hellenic Army General Staff; Αugust 1931 – 15 July 1933	Succeeded by Lt General Dimitrios Katheniotis
