= Alexandros Merentitis =

Greek Army general (1880–1964)

- Αλέξανδρος Μερεντίτης
- Born: c. 1880; Thebes, Kingdom of Greece
- Died: c. 1964; Athens, Kingdom of Greece
- Education: Hellenic Military Academy
- Military career
- Allegiance: Kingdom of Greece; (Greece) Second Hellenic Republic
- Branch: Hellenic Army; HMC
- Service years: 1900–1922; 1925–1934
- Rank: Major General
- Commands: II Army Corps; Deputy Chief of the Hellenic Army General Staff
- Wars: Macedonian Struggle; Balkan Wars; World War I Southern Russia Intervention; Greco-Turkish War of 1919–1922
- Other work: Minister General-Governor of Northern Greece; Minister for Military Affairs; Minister for Naval Affairs

Alexandros Merentitis (Greek: Αλέξανδρος Μερεντίτης, c. 1880–1964) was a Hellenic Army officer who rose to the rank of Major General. He participated in all Greek wars of the early 20th century, served as effective Chief of the Hellenic Army General Staff in 1928–1929, General Secretary of the newly established Aviation Ministry in 1930–1934, and briefly as General-Governor of Northern Greece and Minister of Military Affairs in 1945.

== Biography ==
Alexandros Merentitis was born in Thebes in about 1880. He enrolled in the Hellenic Military Academy and graduated on 6 July 1902 as an Artillery 2nd Lieutenant. In 1908, he participated in the last stages of the Macedonian Struggle, under the nom de guerre of "Doukas". While serving as a secretary in the Greek consulate at Monastir, he was arrested by the Ottoman authorities and spent a time in prison. In the same year, he was promoted to lieutenant, and participated in both Balkan Wars of 1912–1913 as a battery commander, fighting in both Epirus and Macedonia.

After the Balkan Wars, he was promoted to captain (1913) and assigned to teach geography at the Military Academy. Merentitis was promoted to major in 1915, and after Greece's entry in World War I in 1917, to lieutenant colonel. During the war he served as artillery commander of the 4th Infantry Division on the Macedonian front. He continued in the same post in the 2nd Infantry Division during the Greek participation in the Allied intervention in Ukraine against the Bolsheviks. He was promoted to full colonel in the same year (1919). After the end of the Allied campaign, he was transferred to Anatolia, where Greece was engaged in a war with the Turkish Nationalist forces of Mustafa Kemal. He served throughout the Greco-Turkish War of 1919–1922, first as artillery commander of II Army Corps and then as artillery commander of I Army Corps. On 24 June 1922, shortly before the decisive Turkish offensive in August, he was also placed as chief of staff of I Corps.

After the collapse of the Greek front and evacuation from Anatolia, Merentitis was suspended from active service. In 1925 he returned to service, was promoted to major general and appointed as Artillery Inspector of the Army, and studied in the French Army Artillery School at Metz. On his return, he was appointed deputy chief of the Hellenic Army General Staff (29 October 1928 – 17 October 1929); however, as the post of the chief was vacant during this period, he was the effective head of the Army. In 1930 he was appointed General Secretary of the newly established Aviation Ministry, from which post he retired in 1934. In 1945, he served as Minister General-Governor of Northern Greece in the first cabinet of Admiral Petros Voulgaris (16 April – 11 August), and as Minister for Military Affairs in Voulgaris' second cabinet (22 August – 17 October), and in the cabinet of Archbishop Damaskinos of Athens (17 October – 1 November). In the latter he also served as Minister for Naval Affairs from 19 October.

He was unmarried, and died in 1964.

Political offices
Preceded by Petros Voulgaris	Minister for Naval Affairs of Greece; 19 October – 1 November 1945	Succeeded by Panagiotis Kanellopoulos
Preceded by Petros Voulgaris	Minister for Military Affairs of Greece; 22 August – 1 November 1945	Succeeded by Spyridon Georgoulis
Preceded by Theodoros Manetas	Minister Governor-General for Northern Greece; 4 December 1926 – 4 July 1928	Vacant
Military offices
Preceded by Lt General Nikolaos Vlachopoulos	Deputy Chief of the Hellenic Army General Staff (position of Chief vacant at this time); 29 October 1928 – 17 October 1929	Succeeded by Lt General Alexandros Mazarakis-Ainian
