= Kydoniai Division =

Infantry division of the Hellenic Army

The Kydoniai Division (Greek: Μεραρχία Κυδωνιών) was an infantry division of the Hellenic Army, active in 1920 during the Asia Minor Campaign.

Following the Greek landing at Smyrna on 2 May 1919, and the establishment of an occupation zone in Ionia, the Kydoniai Division, named after the Greek name of the town of Ayvali, began formation in January 1920. Its core was provided by the independent 31st Infantry Regiment at Lake Doiran, the 32nd Infantry Regiment detached from the 8th Infantry Division at Ioannina, and the Smyrna Guard Regiment, which was renamed into the 33rd Infantry Regiment. Following completion of its formation in February, the division became part of the Smyrna Army Corps. The division's first and only commander was Colonel Alexandros Othonaios.

In 14–20 September, the larger part of the division was shipped to Greece to provide guards for the November 1920 elections. The units that remained behind were amalgamated with the Crete Division that was transferred to Asia Minor at the same time. Following the elections, the division returned to Asia Minor, only to be abolished: the headquarters were merged with those of the Crete Division, while the 31st and 32nd Regiments were disbanded and merged into the 33rd Regiment, which also became part of the Crete Division, which in turn was renamed as the 5th Infantry Division.

== Sources ==
- Neroutsos, Konstantinos (1957). Η εκστρατεία εις την Μικράν Ασίαν 1919-1922. Ο Ελληνικός Στρατός εις την Σμύρνην (Μάιος 1919-Μάιος 1920) (in Greek). Athens: Hellenic Army History Directorate.
- Neroutsos, Konstantinos (1957). Η εκστρατεία εις την Μικράν Ασίαν 1919-1922. Επιχειρήσεις Φιλαδελφείας-Προύσης-Ουσάκ (Ιούνιος-Νοέμβριος 1920) (in Greek). Athens: Hellenic Army History Directorate.
- Πολεμική Ιστορία του Ελληνικού Έθνους: Περίοδος Παγκοσμίου Πολέμου - Εκστρατεία Μικράς Ασίας [Military History of the Greek Nation: Period of the World War - Asia Minor Campaign] (in Greek). Athens: Στρατιωτική Εγκυκλοπαίδεια. c. 1930.
