= Government House (Thessaloniki) =

Coordinates: 40.640848°N 22.9448068°E

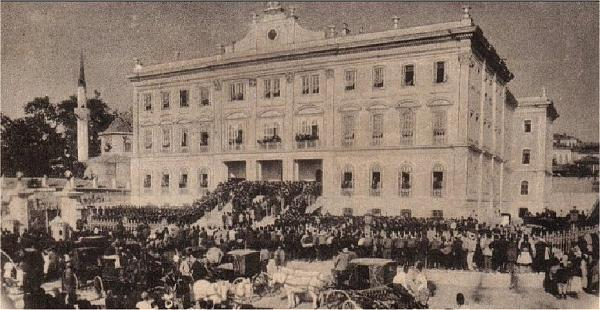
Inauguration in 1892

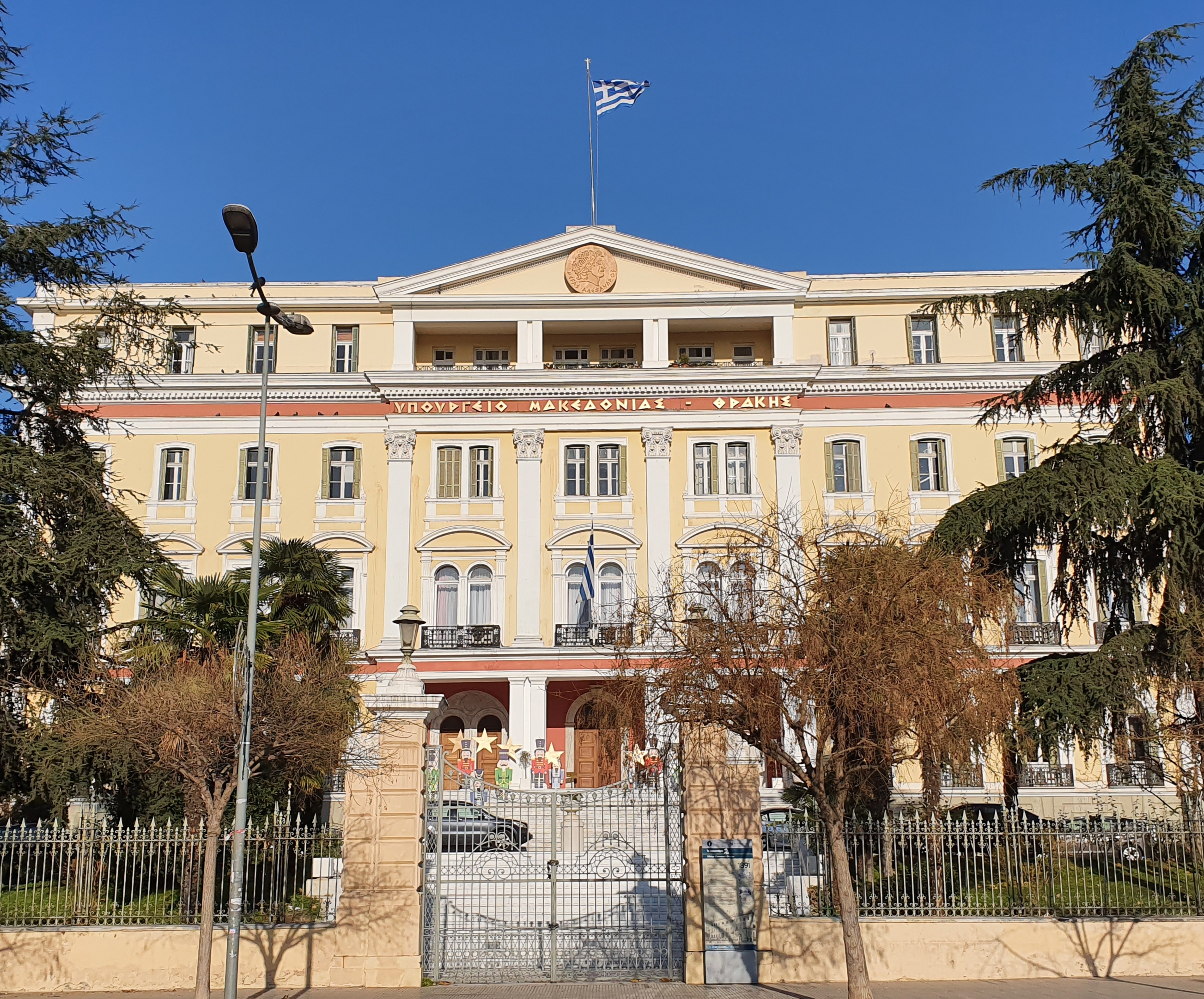
The building today

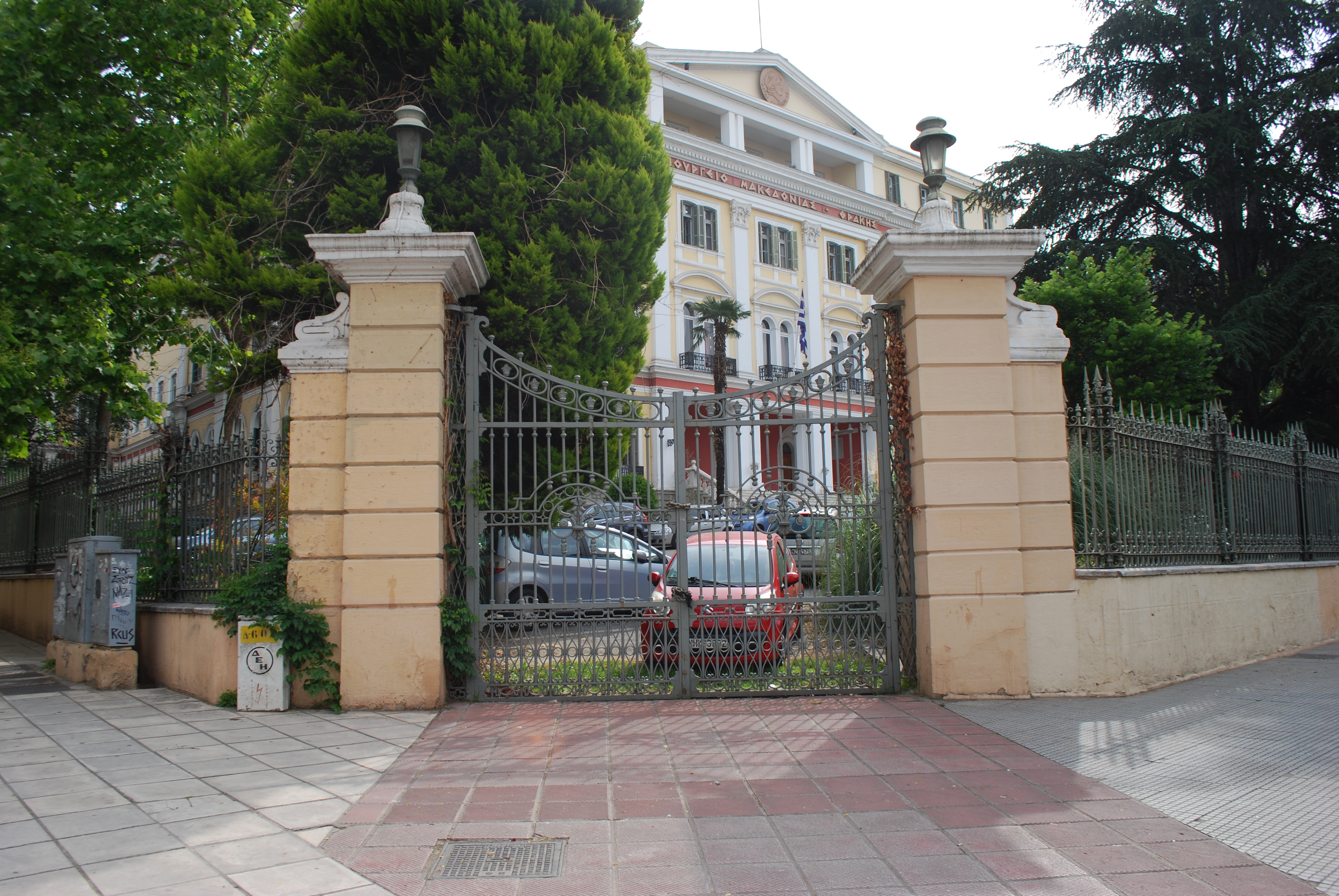
Entrance view

The Konak (Greek: Κονάκι; Turkish: Konak), otherwise known as the Government House (Greek: Διοικητήριο), is an Ottoman-era building in central Thessaloniki, Greece. Originally built in 1891 as the residence (konak) of the governor-general (veli) of the Salonica Vilayet and the seat of the Ottoman authorities, it now houses the Ministry of Macedonia and Thrace. It is a listed building as "The Government House of Thessaloniki" (Greek: Διοικητήριο Θεσσαλονίκης).

== History ==
The Konak was built in 1891 by Italian architect Vitaliano Poselli. The architect chose eclecticism as the main style for the building, which combines elements of various architectural styles such as neoclassicism. It sits on top of the ruins of the imperial palace of the Byzantine Emperor in Thessaloniki, of which some remnants have been found near the building. When it was completed in the late 1890s, it only had three floors. The fourth floor, in neoclassical style, was added in 1955.

In 1907, the building housed the Ottoman School of Law, and in 1911 the Ottoman sultan Mehmed V stayed here during his visit to the city. During the First Balkan War, it was inside this building that the documents of the surrender of Thessaloniki were signed, making Thessaloniki part of the Kingdom of Greece. From 1912 to 1929 the building housed the Governorate-General of Macedonia. During the Great Fire of 1917, the building sustained no damage, despite widespread devastation in the area, which destroyed much of the old city centre.
