= Georgios Katechakis =

Greek Army officer and politician (1881–1939)

- Γεώργιος Κατεχάκης
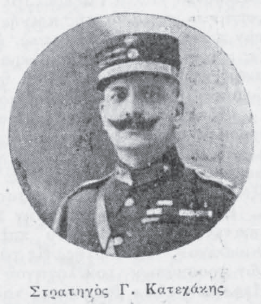
- Georgios Katechakis c. 1922

Minister of Military Affairs
- In office 16 January – 6 March 1933
- Prime Minister: Eleftherios Venizelos
- Preceded by: Georgios Kondylis
- Succeeded by: Alexandros Othonaios
- In office 22 December 1930 – 26 May 1932
- Prime Minister: Eleftherios Venizelos
- Preceded by: Eleftherios Venizelos
- Succeeded by: Alexandros Papanastasiou
- In office 25 July – 7 October 1924
- Prime Minister: Themistoklis Sofoulis
- Preceded by: Theodoros Pangalos
- Succeeded by: Andreas Michalakopoulos

Minister Governor-General of Crete
- In office 10 March 1928 – 22 December 1930
- Prime Minister: Alexandros Zaimis; Eleftherios Venizelos
- Preceded by: Titos Georgiadis
- Succeeded by: Nikolaos Askoutis

Minister Governor-General of Thrace
- In office 1922–1923
- Prime Minister: Nikolaos Triantafyllakos; Anastasios Charalambis; Sotirios Krokidas; Stylianos Gonatas

Personal details
- Born: c. 1881 Pompia, Crete, Ottoman Empire (now Greece)
- Died: 22 April 1939 Athens, Kingdom of Greece
- Education: Hellenic Army Academy

Military service
- Allegiance: Kingdom of Greece; Provisional Government of National Defence; Second Hellenic Republic
- Branch/service: Hellenic Army
- Years of service: 1902–1920; 1922–1923
- Rank: Major General
- Commands: Cretan Volunteer Corps; 11th Infantry Division; National Defence Army Corps
- Battles/wars: Macedonian Struggle; Balkan Wars; World War I; Macedonian Front

Georgios Katechakis (Greek: Γεώργιος Κατεχάκης; 1881–1939) was a Hellenic Army officer and politician. He distinguished himself with his participation in the Macedonian Struggle under the nom de guerre Kapetan Rouvas (Καπετάν Ρούβας) in 1904–1905. An ardent Venizelist, he participated in the Movement of National Defence. After his retirement from the army with the rank of Major General, he entered politics, being elected into the Greek Parliament and the Greek Senate. He also served three times as Minister for Military Affairs and as Governor-General for Thrace (1922–1923) and for Crete (1928–1930).

== Early life and military career ==
Georgios Katechakis was born in the village of Pompia, in then Ottoman-controlled Crete. His father was Antonios Katechakis, one of the main leaders of the Cretan Revolt of 1866–1869. The elder Katechakis also participated in the uprisings of 1878, 1889 and 1896 and was repeatedly elected to the Cretan Parliament until his death. Georgios Katechakis entered the Hellenic Army Academy and graduated in 1902, being commissioned into the Hellenic Army on 6 July 1902 with the rank of a Lieutenant of Infantry. He was one of the first officers to volunteer for the Macedonian Struggle against the Bulgarian-sponsored Internal Macedonian Revolutionary Organization (IMRO). Under the pseudonym of "Kapetan Rouvas", he led an armed band in the regions of Grevena, Kastoria and Monastir. He returned to Greece in 1908, and was dispatched to Crete to assist in the establishment of a local national guard. By the time the Balkan Wars broke out in 1912, he had risen to the rank of captain. He participated in the wars as leader of various Cretan volunteer corps, fighting both in Macedonia and in Epirus.

In 1914, promoted to major, he was assigned as chief of staff to the 11th Infantry Division in Thessaloniki. From there he participated in the Venizelist National Defence uprising in August 1916, that led to the establishment of a parallel, pro-Entente government in northern Greece under Eleftherios Venizelos. He initially served as director of personnel in the National Defence government's Ministry of Military Affairs, and in 1917 he was assigned as chief of staff to the newly raised National Defence Army Corps, which fought in the Macedonian front. Following the end of the First World War, in 1919 he was sent to Constantinople as head of the Greek military delegation there, a post he held until he was dismissed from the army, with the rank of major general, following the electoral victory of the anti-Venizelist royalist parties in November 1920.

Katechakis was recalled to active duty in September 1922, following the Greek defeat in the Asia Minor Campaign and the Venizelist-led September 1922 Revolution. He was placed by the revolutionary government as Governor-General of Thrace (where a recommencement of hostilities with the Turks was expected should peace negotiations in Lausanne fail), remaining at the post until after the signing of the Treaty of Lausanne in 1923 when he retired from military service.

== Political career ==
In the December 1923 elections, Katechakis was elected to the National Assembly representing Heraklion Prefecture. He served as Minister for Military Affairs in the short-lived Themistoklis Sofoulis cabinet (25 July – 7 October 1924). On 10 March 1928, he was appointed to the post of Governor-General of Crete, which was raised to the rank of a cabinet minister, a post he retained until 22 December 1930 under the premierships of Alexandros Zaimis and Venizelos. In the meantime, in April 1929 Katechakis was elected to the Greek Senate. On 22 December 1930, Katechakis was appointed by Venizelos as Minister for Military Affairs, a post he held until the resignation of the Venizelos cabinet on 26 May 1932. Katechakis served for a third time as Minister for Military Affairs in the short-lived 1933 Venizelos cabinet.

Georgios Katechakis died on 22 April 1939.

Political offices
| Preceded by Theodoros Pangalos | Minister for Military Affairs of Greece; 25 July – 7 October 1924 | Succeeded by Andreas Michalakopoulos |
| Preceded by Titos Georgiadis as Governor-General of Crete | Minister Governor-General of Crete; 10 March 1928 – 22 December 1930 | Succeeded by Nikolaos Askoutsis |
| Preceded by Eleftherios Venizelos | Minister for Military Affairs of Greece; 22 December 1930 – 26 May 1932 | Succeeded by Alexandros Papanastasiou (pro tempore) |
| Preceded by Georgios Kondylis | Minister for Military Affairs of Greece; 16 January – 6 March 1933 | Succeeded by Alexandros Othonaios |
