= Konstantinos Despotopoulos =

Greek philosopher and intellectual

Konstantinos Despotopoulos (Greek: Κωνσταντίνος Δεσποτόπουλος; 8 February 1913 – 7 February 2016) was a Greek philosopher and intellectual who became a university professor and the Minister of National Education and Religious Affairs of Greece.

== Biography ==
Konstantinos Despotopoulos was born in Smyrna (now İzmir), then part of the Ottoman Empire, in 1913. Following the destruction of the city and the flight of its Greek population at the end of the Greco-Turkish War of 1919–22, his family settled in Athens. He attended the 1st Gymnasium of Athens, which he graduated with perfect marks, and received his PhD from the University of Athens in Philosophy, again with perfect marks.

He taught Philosophy of Law and general philosophy courses at the University of Athens, the University of Nancy II, and the Panteion University. In 1984 he was elected a member of the Academy of Athens, serving as its chairman in 1993. He was a foreign Fellow of the Romanian Academy and the Académie de Marseille.

As an active member of the National Liberation Front during the Axis occupation of Greece, following the outbreak of the Greek Civil War he was dismissed from his post at the university and spent the years 1947–50 in internal exile at Makronisos.

From 1989 to 1990 he served as Minister of National Education and Religious Affairs of Greece in the caretaker cabinet of Ioannis Grivas and the ecumenical cabinet of Xenophon Zolotas, and was proposed by the leftist Synaspismos as its candidate in the 1990 Greek presidential election.

Despotopoulos died in Athens one day shy of his 103rd birthday on 7 February 2016.

== Work ==
He published 32 books on philosophy, history, and politics.
