= 32nd Marines Brigade =

32nd Marines Brigade "Moravas"
- 32η Ταξιαρχία Πεζοναυτών "Μοράβας"
- Camp flag of the 32nd Marines Brigade
- Active: 1919–1941; 1959–present 1967–present as a naval infantry unit
- Country: Greece
- Branch: Hellenic Army
- Type: Marines
- Role: Air assault Amphibious reconnaissance Amphibious warfare Demolition; Desert warfare Fire support Force protection Raiding; Reconnaissance; Special reconnaissance
- Size: Brigade (5 Battalions)
- Part of: I Infantry Division; Spanish–Italian Amphibious Battlegroup
- Garrison/HQ: Volos, Thessaly
- Mottos: Courage is Necessary; Θαρσεῖν Χρή (Theocritus, Idylls)
- Anniversaries: Foundation in 1919
- Engagements: Greco-Turkish War (1919-1922); World War II: Battle of Greece; Greco-Italian War; Greek Civil War

The 32nd Marines Brigade (Greek: 32 ΤΑΞ ΠΝ - 32η Ταξιαρχία Πεζοναυτών Mοράβας, romanized: 32 TAX PN - 32 Taxiarhia Pezonavton Moravas) is a marines unit of Hellenic Republic. The brigade is based at the port town of Volos in Thessaly, and its primary role is infantry and amphibious operations on the numerous islands off the Greek coast. Unlike other countries, the Greek Marines form part of the Army, while the landing craft and naval equipment are provided by the Hellenic Navy.

== History ==
The unit traces its ancestry to the 32nd Infantry Regiment, formed in Preveza in 1919, then belonging to the 8th Infantry Division. It took part in the Greco-Turkish War as part of the Kydoniai Division and the 5th Infantry Division, and later in the Greco-Italian War during the Second World War. After the occupation of Greece by the Germans, it was disbanded. In 1959 the Regiment was raised anew as the 132nd Light Infantry Regiment and moved to Attica as a reserve unit, but in 1967 was reorganized as a Marines unit under the name 32nd Marines Regiment.

In January 1988, after the disbandment of the unified 3rd Special Forces Division, the unit was enlarged to brigade size. It is currently placed under the II Army Corps as part of the Greek Rapid Reaction Force.

The 32nd Marines Brigade was established in 1988 after the reorganization of the Special Forces Command.

The 32nd Marines Brigade has engaged in many trainings with the 26th Marine Expeditionary Unit and French marines.

== Uniform and unit insignia ==
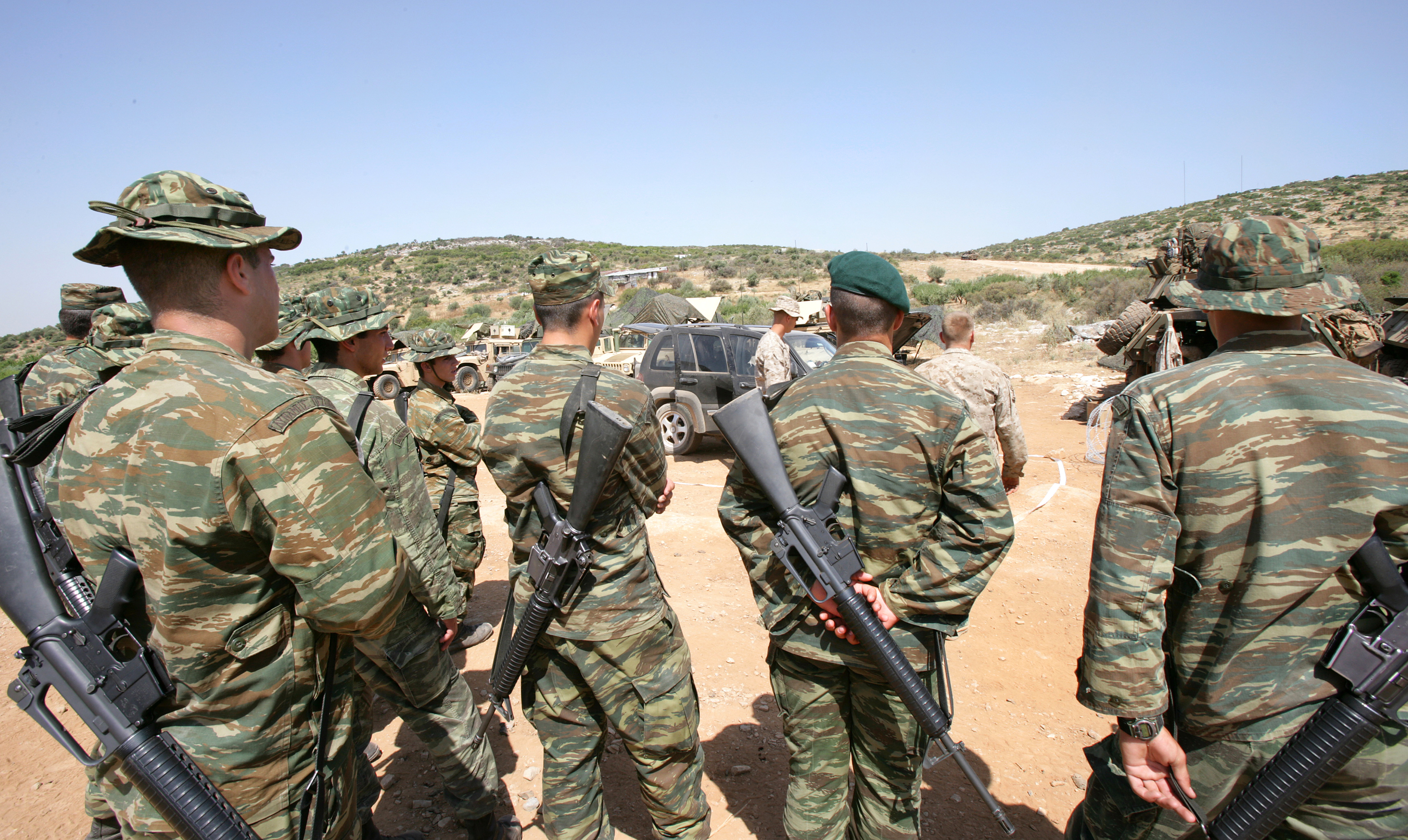
Greek marines in 2009

All Marines wear the standard-issue Greek Lizard camouflage BDUs of the Hellenic Army. Members of the 32nd Marines Brigade originally wore the blue beret, but this was changed to the green beret in 2001 because of its Special Forces role. The blue beret was, subsequently, issued to infantry units.

The unit insignia depicts the Argo, the ship of Jason and the Argonauts, and is representative of the first recorded Greek marine expedition. Brigade HQ is based at Volos, near the ancient Thessalian port city of Iolcos, from where the Argonauts embarked on their mission to retrieve the Golden Fleece. The unit flash is emblazoned with ΔΥΝΑΜΕΙΣ ΠΕΖΟΝΑΥΤΩΝ Dynamis Pezonavton (Marine Forces).

The unit motto is Courage Is Necessary (Greek: ΘΑΡΣΕΙΝ ΧΡΗ - Tharsin Hri), is officially attributed to the Goddess Athena, through the mouth of Odysseus, as words of encouragement to the Greek forces besieging the city of Troy. However, it actually stems from Theocritus' Idylls and is unrelated to Homer.

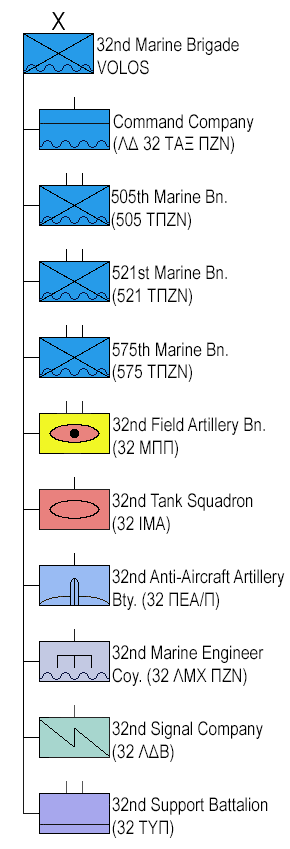
Structure of the 32nd Marines Brigade

== Structure ==
32nd Marines Brigade "Moravas" in Volos, Thessaly

- Headquarters Company (Λόχος Διοικήσεως, ΛΔ/32ης ΤΑΞ ΠΝ)
- 505th Marines Battalion-Training Center (505o Τάγμα Πεζοναυτών, 505ο ΤΠΝ
  - Command company, three Marine companies, Support company
- 521st Marines Battalion (521o Τάγμα Πεζοναυτών, 521ο ΤΠΝ)
  - Command company, three Marine companies, Support company
- 575th Marines Battalion (575o Τάγμα Πεζοναυτών, 575ο ΤΠΝ)
  - Command company, three Marine companies, Support company
- 32nd Medium Tank Squadron (32η Ίλη Μέσων Αρμάτων, 32η ΙΜΑ)
  - Four tank platoons, with a total of 17 Leopard 1A5 tanks
- 32nd Field Artillery Battalion (32η Μοίρα Πεδινού Πυροβολικού)
  - Command battery and three fire batteries, with a total of 12 Μ109 howitzers
- 32nd Marines Engineers Company (32ος Λόχος Μηχανικού, 32 ΛΜΧ)
- 32nd Light Air Artillery Battery (32 Πυροβολαρχία Ελαφρού Αντι-Αεροπορικού Πυροβολικού, 32η ΠΕΑ/ΑΠ)
- 32nd Signals Company (32ος Λόχος Διαβιβάσεων, 32ος ΛΔΒ)
- 32nd Support Battalion (32ο Τάγμα Υποστήριξης, 32ο ΤΥΠ)

== Gallery ==
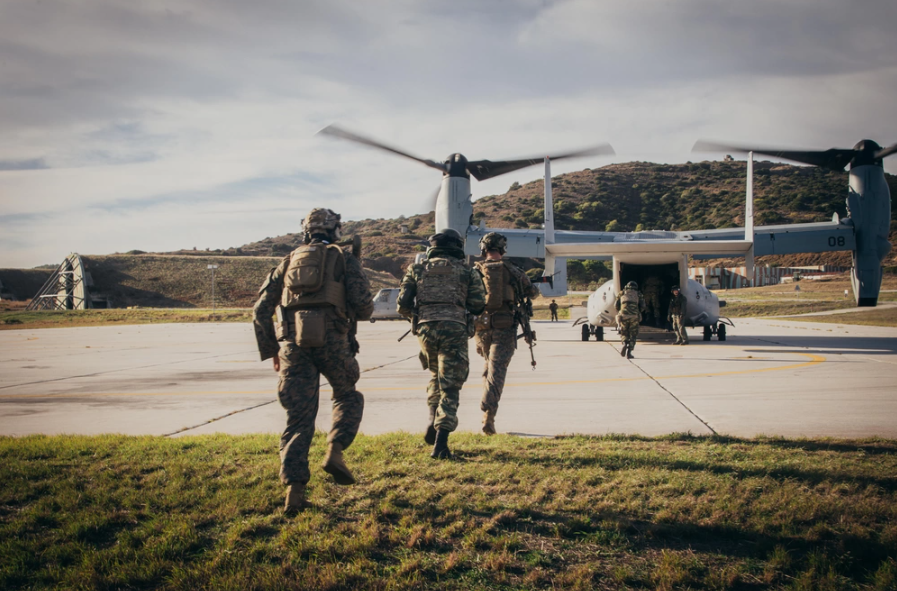
Greek and US Marines during an exercise in February 2023

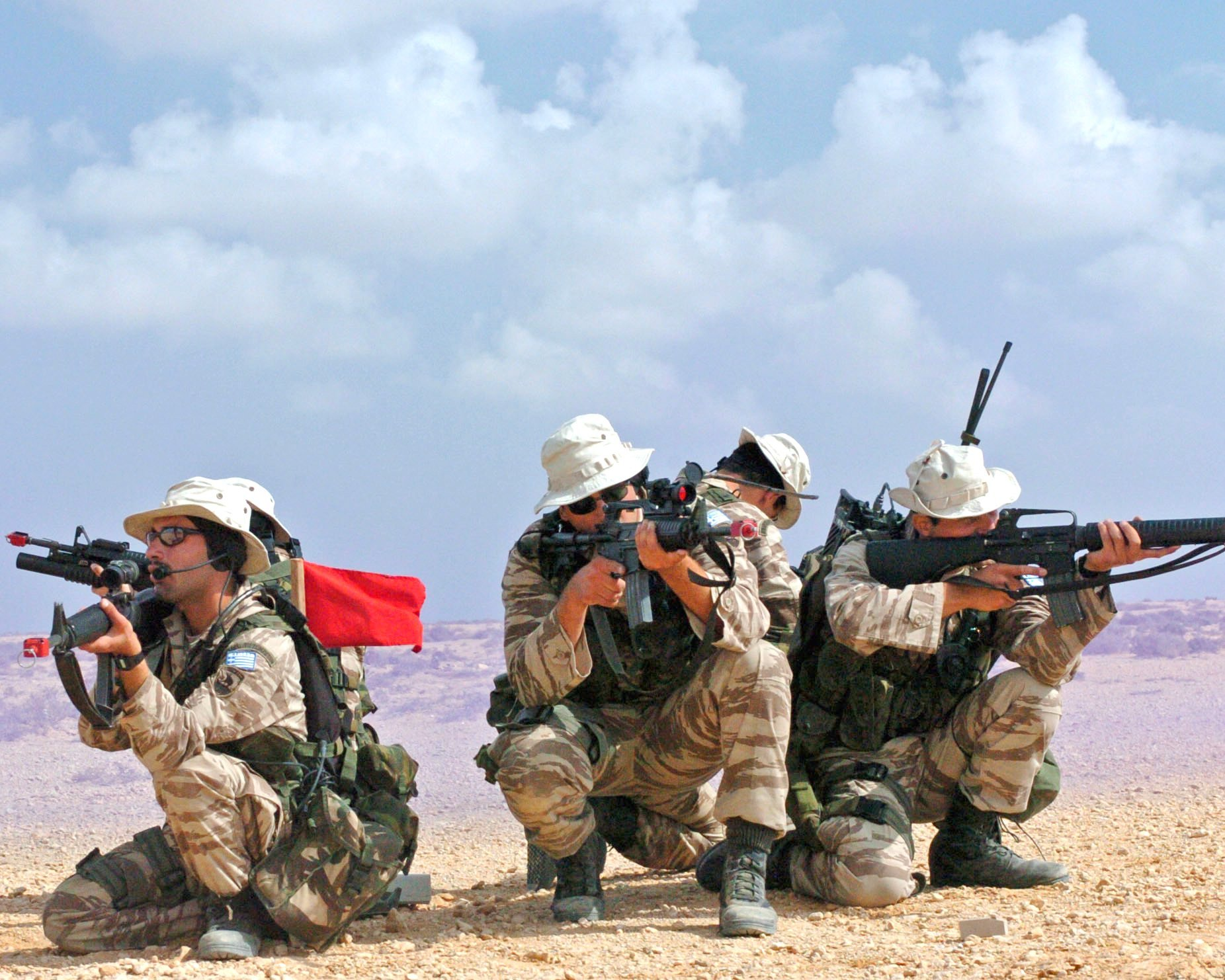
Hellenic Marines in a beach exercise

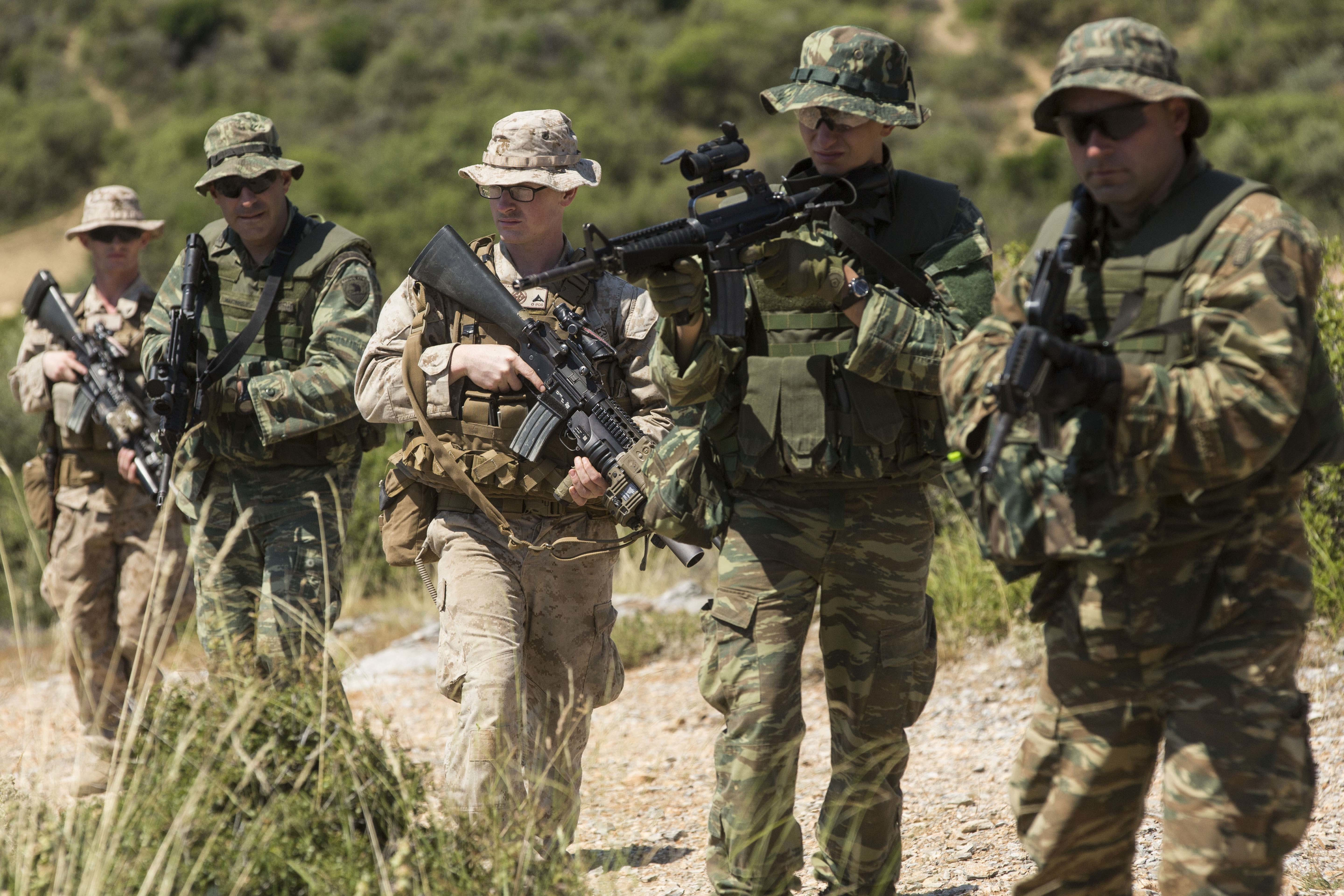
Greek Marines with the 24th MEU
