= Andrew Jarvis =

Greek-American politician & businessman (1890–1990)

Mayor of Portsmouth
- In office 1958–1959

New Hampshire Executive Council District 3
- In office 1961–1963

Personal details
- Born: Andreas Harry Giavis; April 7, 1890 Magouliana, Greece
- Died: February 22, 1990 (aged 99) Portsmouth, New Hampshire
- Party: Republican

Andrew Harry Jarvis (born Andreas Harry Giavis; April 7, 1890 – February 22, 1990) was a Greek-American politician and businessman from New Hampshire.

== Biography ==
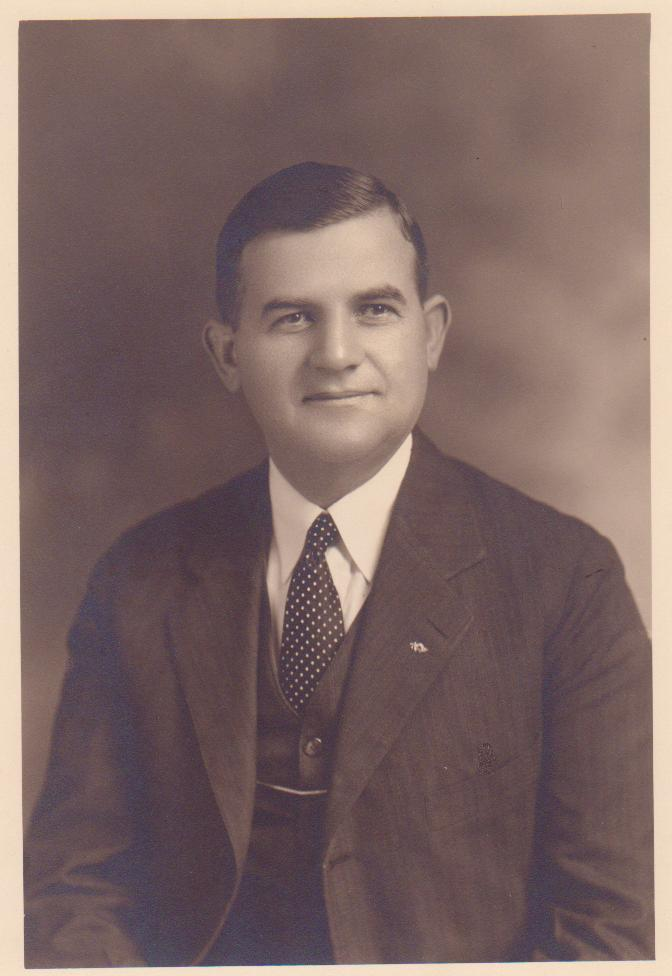
Andrew Jarvis in the early 1930s

=== Early life ===
Andrew Harry Jarvis (born Andreas Harry Giavis) was born in Magouliana, Greece to parents Harry and Catherine (née Cateras) on April 7, 1890. He immigrated to the United States in the early 1900s, originally settling in Lowell, Massachusetts. Jarvis worked in a local mill earning $3.50 a week while learning English. According to his daughter, Catherine, Jarvis would eat apple pie for lunch every day during this time because that was all he knew how to order in English. Over the next ten years he would become fluent in English and receive an education through night school. Jarvis eventually settled in Portsmouth, New Hampshire sometime around 1912. He would spend the rest of his life in Portsmouth and remain involved in local affairs well into his 90s. While in Portsmouth Jarvis opened his first restaurant, The Jarvis Cafeteria, in 1913. Between 1915 and 1930 he opened several more restaurants and candy/ice cream stores in Portsmouth, Lawrence, Massachusetts, and Brunswick, Maine. During the height of the Great Depression, Jarvis and his business partner purchased the historic Rockingham Hotel.

=== Political career ===
Andrew Jarvis was a lifelong Republican and served as mayor of Portsmouth from 1958 to 1959. He was later elected as a member of the Executive Council of New Hampshire from Portsmouth and served from 1961 to 1963. He was encouraged by local Republicans to run for Governor but decided not to, citing his desire to remain in Portsmouth. Jarvis was a delegate to the 1956 Republican National Convention. He met every Republican president from Calvin Coolidge to George H. W. Bush and actively campaigned for Dwight D. Eisenhower and Richard Nixon in New England. Andrew Jarvis was a close personal friend of Senator Styles Bridges.

=== Later life ===
In the early 1980s, his nephews took over his restaurant in Portsmouth, New Hampshire, and Andrew Jarvis retired. He was a member of many organizations, including Rotary International and his local Masonic Lodge. Every year in Portsmouth the Rotary Club holds the Andrew and Grace Jarvis Memorial Road Race in honor of him and his wife. Mr. Jarvis was a supporter of many charities. Jarvis is credited for helping to start the Strawberry Bank Historical Society, which helped transform a seedy area of downtown Portsmouth back into a beautiful historic New England town by renovating the 18th-century historic homes. He also helped bring the Pease Air Force Base to Portsmouth. Jarvis died in early 1990 at age 99 years, 10 months. The Portsmouth Rotary club had planned a 100th birthday party for him; they instead held a celebration in his honor where his daughter gave a speech talking about his life and service to Portsmouth. After fearing that his daughter, Catherine (1924–2013), would become blind from sickness as a baby, Jarvis made a promise to God to help the blind in his native Greece. After World War II, Jarvis helped to found the American Friends of the Blind in Greece (AFBG) in 1946, which set up a school and museum for the blind in Greece paid for by donations by Greek-Americans. He was the president until his death in 1990, at which time his son-in-law took over until 2007.

== Establishments formerly owned ==
- Rockingham Hotel
- Jarvis Cafeteria
- Jarvis Restaurant
- Apollo Lunch Company
- Jarvis Tea Room
- The Market Square Pub

== Titles ==
- President of Portsmouth Rotary Club
- St. Nicholas Greek Orthodox Church Parish Council President
- Thirty - Second degree ancient Scottish Rite (Masonic Lodge)
- President Portsmouth Red Cross
- Member of National Restaurant Association
- Food Advisor Navy/Army of New Hampshire
- NH campaign head of Eisenhower, Nixon, Goldwater, Ford, Reagan, and Bush
- Founder Friends of the Blind of Greece in America

== Honors ==
- Andrew Jarvis Drive in Portsmouth
- Jarvis Center Function Hall
- Andrew and Grace Jarvis Memorial 5K
- Andrew Jarvis School for the Blind in Greece

== Sources ==
- Men of New England. American Historical Company, 1943, page 355.
- New Hampshire Executive Council - former councilors
- Strawbery Banke: A Seaport Museum 400 Years in the Making. By Dennis Robinson pages 210,211,214,241.
