= Ioannis Charalambopoulos =

Greek Army officer and politician

Ioannis Charalambopoulos Ιωάννης Χαραλαμπόπουλος
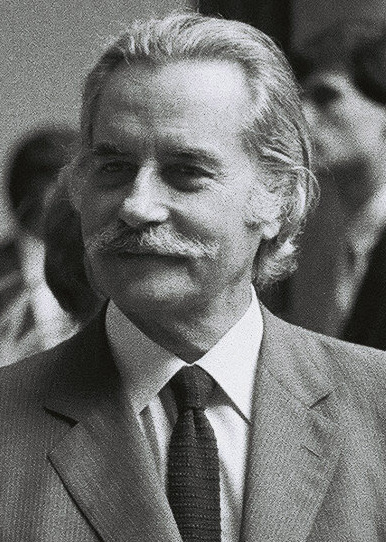
- Yannis Charalambopoulos in 1985

Personal details
- Born: 10 February 1919 Psari, Greece
- Died: 16 October 2014 (aged 95) Athens, Greece
- Party: Panhellenic Socialist Movement
- Profession: Army officer, politician

Ioannis Charalambopoulos (Greek: Ιωάννης Χαραλαμπόπουλος; 10 February 1919 – 16 October 2014) was a Greek Army officer (Colonel of the Engineering Corps) and socialist politician who served as Minister of Foreign Affairs and Minister of National Defence of Greece.

== Early life and political career ==
Charalambopoulos was born in 1919 in Psari, Oichalia, Messenia to a military family. He studied at the Hellenic Army Academy and completed his studies with a scholarship at Woolwich Polytechnic after World War II. During the war, he served as the commander of an infantry unit during the Greco-Italian War and later in the Mediterranean and Middle East Theatre. He left the army in 1963 with the rank of Colonel and became a politician in the Center Union, being elected to Parliament representing Messenia in the 1963 and 1964 elections.

During the Greek military junta of 1967–1974, Charalambopoulos founded the Democratic National Resistance Movement, and spent three years in internal exile for his opposition to the regime. After the fall of the dictatorship in 1974, Charalambopoulos became a founding member of the Panhellenic Socialist Movement, and was elected to Parliament on its lists in all elections from 1974 to 2000, representing the Athens B constituency.

After the accession of Greece to the EEC on 1 January 1981, he became a provisional member of the European Parliament representing Greece until the country could hold its first European Parliament elections in October. On 21 October 1981 he was appointed Minister of Foreign Affairs in the first cabinet of Andreas Papandreou and served in the position until 26 July 1985. He was then appointed Deputy Prime Minister of Greece during Papandreou's second term until 18 November 1988, in addition receiving the portfolio of National Defence on 25 April 1986 which he held until 2 July 1989.

Charalambopoulos died on 16 October 2014, at the age of 95.

Political offices
Preceded by Konstantinos Mitsotakis	Minister for Foreign Affairs of Greece; 21 October 1981 – 5 June 1985	Succeeded by Karolos Papoulias
Vacant Title last held by Konstantinos Papakonstantinou and Evangelos Averoff-Tositsas	Deputy Prime Minister of Greece; 26 July 1985 – 18 November 1988; With: Agamemnon Koutsogiorgas from 23 September 1987	Vacant Title next held by Tzannis Tzannetakis and Athanasios Kanellopoulos
Preceded by Andreas Papandreou	Minister of National Defence of Greece; 25 April 1986 – 2 July 1989	Succeeded by Ioannis Varvitsiotis
