= Costis Gontikas =

Greek basketball player (born 1994)

No. 27 – Vikos Falcons
- Position: Center
- League: Greek Basketball League

Personal information
- Born: March 15, 1994 (age 32) Maroussi, Greece
- Listed height: 2.06 m (6 ft 9 in)
- Listed weight: 112 kg (247 lb)

Career information
- High school: Athens College (Psychiko, Athens)
- College: NYU (2012–2016)
- NBA draft: 2016: undrafted
- Playing career: 2016–present

Career history
- 2016–2017: Panathinaikos
- 2017–2018: Apollon Patras
- 2018–2019: Ifaistos Limnou
- 2019–2020: Peristeri
- 2020–2021: AEK Athens
- 2021–2022: Ionikos Nikaias
- 2022: Argeș Pitești
- 2022: Karditsa
- 2023: AEK Athens
- 2023: Kolossos Rodou
- 2023–2025: Lavrio
- 2025: Þór Þorlákshöfn
- 2025–2026: Panionios
- 2026–present: Vikos Falcons

Career highlights
- Greek League champion (2017); Greek Cup winner (2017)

Konstantinos "Costis" Gontikas (alternate spellings: Constantinos, Kostas, Costas, Kostis, Godikas) (Greek: Κωνσταντίνος "Κώστας" Γόντικας; born March 15, 1994) is a Greek professional basketball player for Vikos Falcons of the Greek Basketball League (GBL). He is a 2.06 m (6 ft 9 in) tall center.

== High school ==
Gontikas played high school basketball at the Athens College, in Psychiko, Athens, Greece.

== College career ==
Gontikas played college basketball in the NCAA Division III, at NYU, with the NYU Violets, from 2012 to 2016.

== Professional career ==
Gontikas began his professional career in 2016, in the Greek Basket League club Panathinaikos. He made his Greek Basket League debut on 13 November 2016, in an 80–65 win against Kolossos. He was released from Panathinaikos on June 20, 2017. In August 2017, he agreed terms with Apollon Patras.

On June 26, 2018, he joined Ifaistos Limnou of the Greek Basket League.

On July 18, 2019, Gontikas signed a three-year contract with Peristeri. On July 31, 2020, Gontikas terminated his contract with Peristeri and signed a one-year deal with AEK Athens.

On August 16, 2021, Gontikas moved to Ionikos Nikaias. In 15 games, he averaged 9.1 points and 5.9 rebounds per contest. On March 22, 2022, Gontikas moved to Romanian club U FC Argeș Pitești for the rest of the season.

Gontikas started out the 2022–2023 season with Karditsa, but on January 20, 2023, he signed back with AEK Athens for the rest of the season. In a total of 14 league games during the season with both clubs, Gontikas averaged 4.6 points and 2.2 rebounds, playing around 11 minutes per contest.

On July 1, 2023, Gontikas signed a two-year contract with Kolossos Rodou.

On December 11, 2023, he moved to Lavrio in an unofficial trade for Kostas Papadakis. On June 11, 2024, Gontikas renewed his contract with Lavrio.

Gontikas started the 2025–2026 campaign with Icelandic club Þór Þorlákshöfn, before returning to Greece for Panionios.

== National team career ==
Gontikas played with the junior national teams of Greece. With Greece's junior national teams, he played at the 2012 FIBA Europe Under-18 Championship and the 2013 FIBA Europe Under-20 Championship. He later represented Greece at men's national team in the European qualifiers for the 2023 FIBA Basketball World Cup. Gontikas also appeared for Greece at the 2022 Acropolis Tournament, playing alongside Giannis Antetokounmpo in the game against Poland. A fracture to his right hand ruled him out of the remainder of the national team's preparations for EuroBasket 2022.

== Honours ==
- Greek League Champion: 2017
- Greek Cup Winner: (2017)

== Personal life ==
His father Dimitris Gontikas is a former international volleyball player. His grandfather was the Greek politician Kostis Gontikas and his great-grandfather was Dimitrios Gontikas.
