= 3rd Special Forces Division =

- Active: 1948–1949, 1978–1988
- Country: Greece
- Branch: Hellenic Army
- Type: Special forces
- Size: Division

The 3rd Special Forces Division (Greek: ΙΙΙ Μεραρχία Ειδικών Δυνάμεων) was a division encompassing the special forces units of the Hellenic Army.

The first similar unit was formed as the 3rd Raiding Division (ΙΙΙ Μεραρχία Καταδρομών) during the final stages of the Greek Civil War (1946–49). Commanded by the "father of Greek Special Forces", Andreas Kallinskis, the division grouped the Mountain Raiding Companies (LOK) into five squadrons (I–V) in two brigades (I and II), and took part in the final operations of the Battle of Grammos in August 1949, that ended the civil war in a victory for government forces.

The 3rd Special Forces Division was formed again in 1978, when, in the aftermath of the Turkish invasion of Cyprus, it became clear that a unified command for the various special forces units of the Army was necessary, if they were to function as a rapid reaction force. The division grouped together the 32nd Marines Brigade, the 1st Raider Regiment and the 2nd Paratroopers Regiment. The division was disbanded in 1988, but a similar role is now fulfilled by the 1st Infantry Division.
