= Nikolaos Martis =

Greek author and politician

- Born: 1 January 1915; Moustheni, Kavala Prefecture, Greece
- Died: 12 November 2013 (aged 98); Moustheni, Kavala Prefecture, Greece
- Occupations: Former Minister, Lawyer, Historian
- Website: www.hri.org/Martis/contents/author.html

Nikolaos K. Martis (Greek: Νικόλαος Κ. Μάρτης; 1 January 1915 – 12 November 2013) was a Greek author and politician.

== Military career ==
He was serving in the Hellenic Army as an artillery officer and when the Germans occupied northern Greece. He escaped to Mount Athos and from there to Egypt where he fought on the Allied side. His very first mission of his military career began in June 1941 when the Greek Army landed in the Middle East. From there, he participated in various battles such as the First and Second Battles of El Alamein in 1942 and later the Battle of Rimini and Dekemvriana in 1944.

== Office career ==
From 1955 to 1956, he held office as secretary general in the Ministry for Northern Greece and was elected seven times as a member of Parliament throughout his political career. From 1956 to 1958, he was undersecretary to the Ministry of Commerce (1956–1958) and from that year till 1961 served as the Minister of Industry. From 1974 to 1981, he was the Minister for Northern Greece.

== Death ==
Martis died in Moustheni, Kavala Prefecture, Greece at the age of 98 and was buried at the First Cemetery of Athens.
