= Konstantinos Manetas =

Greek Army officer (c. 1879–c. 1960)

- Κωνσταντίνος Μανέτας
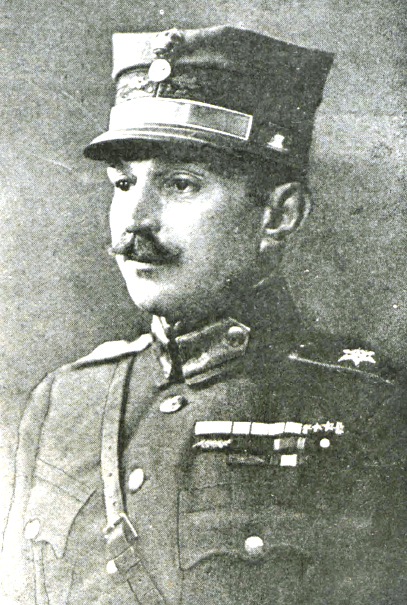
- Konstantinos Manetas c. 1923

Minister of Supply and Distribution
- In office 15 April 1950 – 21 August 1950
- Monarch: Paul
- Prime Minister: Nikolaos Plastiras
- Preceded by: Dimitrios Gondikas
- Succeeded by: Evangelos Averoff

Ministry of Justice
- In office 6 March 1933 – 7 March 1933
- President: Alexandros Zaimis
- Prime Minister: Alexandros Othonaios
- Preceded by: Andreas Markou
- Succeeded by: L. Gidopoulos

Minister of Transport
- In office 6 March 1933 – 10 March 1933
- President: Alexandros Zaimis
- Prime Minister: Alexandros Othonaios
- Preceded by: Georgios Papandreou
- Succeeded by: Ioannis Rallis

Minister of Military Affairs
- In office 30 July 1923 – 11 January 1924
- Monarch: George II
- Prime Minister: Stylianos Gonatas; Eleftherios Venizelos
- Preceded by: Konstantinos Gondikas
- Succeeded by: Stylianos Gonatas

Personal details
- Born: c. 1879 Tripoli, Kingdom of Greece
- Died: 1960 Athens, Kingdom of Greece
- Relations: Konstantinos Kolokotronis (great-great-grandfather); Lambros Tzavelas (great-great-grandfather); Theodoros Kolokotronis (great-grandfather); Ioannis Kolokotronis (grandfather); Photini Tzavela (grandmother); Panos Kolokotronis (great-uncle); Kitsos Tzavellas (great-uncle); Nikitas Stamatelopoulos (great-uncle); Zoe Maneta (sister); Ioannis Manetas (brother); Theodoros Manetas (brother)
- Parent(s): Panagiotis Manetas; Zoe Kolokotroni
- Education: Hellenic Army Academy

Military service
- Allegiance: Kingdom of Greece; Provisional Government of National Defence; Second Hellenic Republic
- Branch/service: Hellenic Army
- Years of service: 1901–1935
- Rank: Lieutenant General
- Commands: 4th Archipelago Regiment; 13th Infantry Division (infantry commander); 7th Infantry Division; II Army Corps; I Army Corps; Chief of the Hellenic Army General Staff
- Battles/wars: Balkan Wars; First Balkan War; Second Balkan War; Battle of Kilkis-Lachanas (WIA); World War I: Macedonian front; Russian Civil War; Allied intervention in the Russian Civil War; Southern Front; Southern Russia Intervention; Greco-Turkish War (1919–1922); 1935 Greek coup d'état attempt

Konstantinos Manetas (Greek: Κωνσταντίνος Μανέτας, c. 1879– c. 1960) was a Hellenic Army officer who rose to the rank of lieutenant general and served as Chief of the Hellenic Army General Staff in 1931. He also served four times in ministerial positions and was elected to parliament in 1950.

== Life ==
He was born in Tripoli around 1879, the son of the politician Panagiotis Manetas, the elder brother of Lieutenant General Theodoros Manetas and younger brother of the politician Ioannis Manetas.

After finishing school, he enrolled in the Hellenic Army Academy and graduated on 11 July 1901 as an Infantry Second Lieutenant. He was promoted to lieutenant in 1908 and captain in 1911. He fought in the Balkan Wars of 1912–1913 as company and battalion commander, and was wounded at the Battle of Kilkis–Lachanas. After the wars he was attached as aide de camp to the chiefs of the French military mission to Greece, generals Joseph-Paul Eydoux and Étienne de Villaret, and was promoted to Major (1914).

During World War I, he joined the Venizelist Provisional Government of National Defence and fought in the Macedonian front as commander of the 4th Archipelago Regiment. He was promoted to lieutenant colonel on 12 January 1917 and to full colonel on 13 December 1917. In 1919 Manetas participated in the unsuccessful Allied intervention in Ukraine as Infantry Commander of the 13th Infantry Division. Following the Allied withdrawal, he led the same division as its commander during the early phases of the Greco-Turkish War of 1919–1922. In 1920, he was promoted to major general. As a confirmed Venizelist, he was suspended from active duty in November 1920 following the Venizelist electoral defeat.

Following the disastrous defeat of the Greek army in Anatolia by the Turkish nationalist forces in August 1922 and the subsequent outbreak of a military revolt, he was recalled to active service as commander of the 7th Infantry Division. He held the post until August 1923, when he was appointed CO of the II Army Corps and soon after named Minister for Military Affairs in the Stylianos Gonatas cabinet, a post he held until January 1924. Manetas was then promoted to Lieutenant General and sent to Paris as military attaché, and returned in 1925 to re-assume command of II Corps, until 1926, when he was appointed commander of I Army Corps. He held this post until 1933, with the exception of June–August 1931, when he was appointed Chief of the General Staff. He served as Transport Minister (and interim Justice Minister for a day) in the interim government of Alexandros Othonaios in March 1933, formed in response of an abortive Venizelist coup. He then assumed the post of Inspector of the Infantry in the General Staff, until March 1935 when he was involved in another unsuccessful Venizelist coup attempt. Following the coup's suppression, he was dismissed from the Army.

During the Axis Occupation of Greece in World War II, Manetas was arrested by the Italians and imprisoned in concentration camps in Italy and Germany. He was elected a Member of the Greek Parliament in 1950 for Athens, and served as Minister for Supply and Distribution in the Nikolaos Plastiras cabinet.

Manetas was unmarried, and died in 1960.

Political offices
Preceded by Stylianos Gonatas (minister pro tempore following resignation of Periklis Pierrakos-Mavromichalis)	Minister for Military Affairs of Greece; 30 July 1923 – 11 January 1924	Succeeded by Konstantinos Gondikas
Preceded by Georgios Papandreou	Minister for Transport of Greece; 6–10 March 1933	Succeeded by Ioannis Rallis
Preceded by Andreas Markou	Minister for Justice of Greece (pro tempore); 6–7 March 1933	Succeeded by L. Gidopoulos
Preceded by Dimitrios Gondikas	Minister for Supply and Distribution of Greece; 15 April – 21 August 1950	Succeeded by Evangelos Averoff
Military offices
Preceded by Lt General Alexandros Mazarakis-Ainian	Chief of the Hellenic Army General Staff; June–Αugust 1931	Succeeded by Lt General Theodoros Manetas
