= Grigoris Giannaros =

Greek politician and journalist (1936-1997)

- Γρηγόρης Γιάνναρος
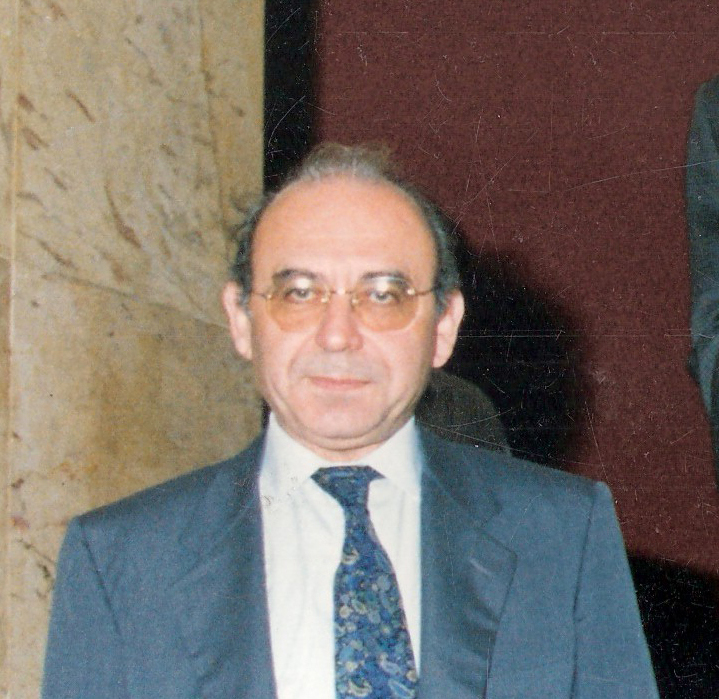

Alternate Minister of Industry, Energy and Technology
- In office 23 November 1989 – 13 February 1990
- Prime Minister: Xenophon Zolotas

Member of the Hellenic Parliament for Athens A
- In office 8 April 1990 – 11 September 1993

Member of the Hellenic Parliament for Athens B
- In office 18 June 1989 – 12 March 1990

Personal details
- Born: April 1936 Salmoni, Elis, Greece
- Died: 5 August 1997 (aged 61)
- Party: Synaspismos
- Spouse: Sonia Tsitilou
- Children: One
- Education: ASOEE; Russian Academy of Sciences

Grigoris Giannaros (Greek: Γρηγόρης Γιάνναρος; April 1936 – 5 August 1997) was a Greek politician and journalist who served in the Ecumenical Cabinet of Xenophon Zolotas and as a Member of the Hellenic Parliament.

== Early life and education ==
Giannaros was born in April 1936 in the village of Salmoni, Elis. He studied economics at the Supreme School of Economics and Business (ASOEE), and completed post-graduate studies at the Russian Academy of Sciences.

== Political career ==
Giannaros was a member of the Central Committee of Synaspismos. He was first elected to the Hellenic Parliament representing Athens B in the June 1989 election. In November 1989, he was appointed as an Alternate Industry Minister in the ecumenical cabinet of Xenophon Zolotas. He was re-elected as an MP for Athens B in the same month. In February 1990, he was removed from his position in a cabinet reshuffle, and was elected in the April 1990 election as the representative of Athens A.

== Personal life ==
Giannaros was married to Sonia Tsitilou and they had one son.

== Death ==
Giannaros died on 5 August 1997 after a "lengthy illness". He was buried at Athens First Cemetery.
