= Prometheus II =

Greek resistance organization during World War II

Prometheus II (Greek: Προμηθεύς II) was a minor group of the Greek Resistance during the Axis occupation of Greece in World War II, engaged in espionage and sabotage operations in collaboration with the Special Operations Executive, as well as providing liaison to other groups of the Resistance.

== History ==
=== Background and establishment of Prometheus I ===
Following the Italian invasion of Greece in October 1940, Section D of British intelligence began recruiting Greeks for clandestine espionage and sabotage activity for the event that Greece might succumb to the Axis powers in mind. Given its purpose, this activity was kept secret from the Greek government—the dictatorial 4th of August Regime led by General Ioannis Metaxas—and the Greek military; instead, the British agents turned to elements traditionally hostile to the ruling regime, chiefly former Republicans, pro-Liberal or left-wing elements, and even Communists. The Republicans and Liberals were historically hostile to Germany and friendly to Britain since the National Schism of World War I, and furthermore eager to fight in their own way since the regime had refused many Venizelist officers who had been dismissed from the military following the Republican coup attempt of March 1935 the opportunity to fight on the front. Likewise the leftists were more accustomed to clandestine and conspiratorial activity, while the British understood early on that "effective sabotage or guerrillas can only thrive if a revolutionary atmosphere has been created previously", and were thus disposed to use the anti-monarchical elements in Greece, whether Republican or Communist, for their own ends.

In early 1941, using Elli Kountourioti (granddaughter of the Liberal icon, Admiral Pavlos Kountouriotis) as an intermediary, the British established a clandestine cell in Athens. It was led by Colonel Evripidis Bakirtzis (under the code name Προμηθεύς, "Prometheus"), and comprised several dismissed Republican officers, such as Charalambos Koutsogiannopoulos, Dimitris Bardopoulos, and Ilias Degiannis. The cell was named, but due to the German invasion of Greece and the rapid conquest of the country in April–May 1941, the British were not able to organize their clandestine network on a firm basis or provide them with suitable material such as radios. Following the British withdrawal, only the Prometheus group used its transmitter to send information to SOE in Cairo. That communication was delayed due to the group's lack of code books, which arrived only in November 1941 through the SOE agent Gerasimos Alexatos, but it was not until the spring of 1942 that the group's legitimacy was accepted by SOE in Cairo. It was through Prometheus that SOE became aware of the burgeoning resistance movement in Greece, with the establishment of major resistance organizations such as the National Liberation Front (EAM) and the National Republican Greek League (EDES).

=== Prometheus II ===
In early 1942, Bakirtzis was forced to leave Greece because his identity had been revealed to the Axis following the arrest of the British agent John Atkinson. This left Koutsogiannopoulos, Bardopoulos, and Degiannis in charge of the group, which was accepted as "Prometheus II" by SOE in Cairo in March 1942. On 3 March 1942, SOE instructed the group to prepare for the arrival by parachute of SOE agents, as well as to begin recruiting new members and establish safe places for weapons and explosives in preparation of a sabotage and guerrilla campaign. In April 1942, Koutsogiannopoulos and another associate of the group, Alekos Seferiadis, were involved in the discussions between Alexatos and prominent Republican political and military personages—Bakirtzis, Napoleon Zervas of EDES, Komninos Pyromaglou, Stefanos Sarafis, and Dimitrios Psarros—on the subject of beginning guerrilla warfare and the Republican officers' stance towards the Communist-controlled EAM.

Despite having received 800 gold sovereigns from the British for the purpose of raising guerrilla forces in the mountains, Zervas proved was reluctant to do so, and was tarrying in Athens, partly because of British willingness to also fund EAM. Cairo came to consider him untrustworthy and ordered Prometheus to cut off all contact with him. Koutsogiannopoulos, fearing that this would scupper the efforts to create an EDES-led guerrilla force, went to Zervas and threatened him, virtually at gunpoint, to publicly denounce him as a traitor and collaborator over the BBC unless he left Athens to lead armed resistance. Zervas left Athens for Epirus on 23 July.

The group began its sabotage activity in the area of Athens, in coordination with the British GHQ in the Middle East, in June–July 1942. The main aim was to obstruct the flow of supplies to the Axis forces in North Africa. Thus Prometheus II sank one oil tanker and one cargo ship carrying ammunition, and damaged two more tankers and two more cargo ships, necessitating repairs that put them out of commission for several weeks. Later, with the aid of the naval engineer Psalidakis, the group managed to retrieve information on the German submarines to be based in the area.

The group continued its activities until February 1943, when the occupation authorities broke it up. Koutsogiannopoulos was arrested but managed to escape with the aid of Ioannis Peltekis, who bribed a clerk to place an order for his release in the pile of papers that the German commandant habitually signed.

During the Dekemvriana of 1944, Koutsogiannopoulos sided with the EAM against the British and government forces. As a result, in the post-war period he faced prosecution, and received no recognition for his Resistance activity.

== Sources ==
- Gerolymatos, André (1992). British Intelligence and Guerrilla Warfare Operations in the Second World War: Greece 1941-1944, A Case Study (PhD thesis). McGill University.
- Gerozisis, Triantafyllos A. (1996). Το Σώμα των αξιωματικών και η θέση του στη σύγχρονη Ελληνική κοινωνία (1821—1975) [The Officer Corps and its place in Modern Greek Society (1821—1975)] (in Greek). Athens: Dodoni. ISBN 960-248-794-1.
- Spiliotopoulou, Maria (2014). "Η οργάνωση Προμηθεύς II και οι βρετανικές πολιτικές για την ανάπτυξη της αντίστασης στην κατεχόμενη Ελλάδα (1941-1943)" [The Prometheus II Organization and the British Policies for the Development of the Resistance in Occupied Greece (1941-1943)]. Αριστερά και Αστικός Πολιτικός Κόσμος 1940-1960 [The Left and the Bourgeois Political World 1940-1960] (in Greek). Vivliorama. ISBN 978-960-9548-20-5.
