= Theodoros Degiannis =

Greek admiral

Theodoros Degiannis (Greek: Θεόδωρος Ντεγιάννης, 1926–2006) was a Greek admiral and chief of the Hellenic National Defence General Staff. He also served as the Minister of National Defence in the Caretaker Cabinet of Ioannis Grivas and in the Ecumenical Cabinet of Xenophon Zolotas.

He was born in 1926 in Chalcis, Euboea. In 1948 he graduated from the Hellenic Naval Academy and later continued his studies in other academies, including taking the Senior Officers' War Course at the Royal Naval College, Greenwich. During the Greek military junta of 1967–74, he was opposed to the regime, like many Navy officers. In 1977 he was promoted to vice admiral. In January 1982 he was appointed chief of the Hellenic National Defence General Staff by the government of Andreas Papandreou, as he was one of the officers considered most trustworthy by the newly elected government of PASOK. He held the post until December 1984.

In October 1989 he became Minister for National Defence in the Caretaker Cabinet of Ioannis Grivas. In February 1990 he became again Minister in the Ecumenical Cabinet of Xenophon Zolotas after a Cabinet reshuffle on 13 February 1990.

He died in 2006.

His brother was Ioannis Degiannis, the presiding judge at the Greek Junta Trials and member of parliament with PASOK. Another brother, Ioannis Degiannis, was also a naval officer and a leading member of the Prometheus II resistance organization during World War II.

Military offices
Preceded by General Agamemnon Gratsios	Chief of the Hellenic National Defense General Staff; 1982–1984	Succeeded by Air Chief Marshal Nikolaos Kouris
Political offices
Preceded by Ioannis Varvitsiotis	Minister of National Defence; 12 October 1989 – 23 November 1989	Succeeded by Tzannis Tzannetakis
Preceded by Tzannis Tzannetakis	Minister of National Defence; 13 February 1990 – 11 April 1990	Succeeded by Ioannis Varvitsiotis
