= Ministry of Macedonia and Thrace =

Former government department of Greece

- Υπουργείο Μακεδονίας και Θράκης; Ypourgeío Makedonías kai Thrákis
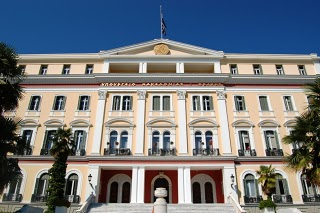
- The building of the ministry in Thessaloniki

Agency overview
- Formed: 1912
- Preceding agency: Governorate-General of Macedonia (1912–1955) Ministry of Northern Greece (1955–1988) Ministry of Macedonia and Thrace (1988–7 October 2009) General Secretariat of Macedonia and Thrace (7 October 2009–21 June 2012)
- Headquarters: 32 Kassandrou Street; 54633 Thessaloniki; Greece; 40°38′N 22°56′E
- Annual budget: € 12.35 million (2010) € 21.23 million (2009)
- Website: www.mathra.gr

The Ministry of Macedonia and Thrace (Greek: Υπουργείο Μακεδονίας και Θράκης, ΥΜΑΘ) is a former ministry of Greece. Responsible for the regions of Macedonia and Thrace, since 2015 it has been demoted to the level of a sub-ministry within the Ministry of the Interior. The incumbent Deputy Minister for Macedonia and Thrace is Konstantinos Gioulekas of New Democracy.

The ministry had been known as the Ministry of Northern Greece until it was renamed on 19 August 1988. It was demoted to a general secretariat in 2009, but was re-established as a ministry in 2012, and again demoted to a sub-ministry within the Ministry of the Interior on 27 January 2015. It is housed in Government House in Thessaloniki.

== History ==
The ministry was founded in 1912 as the Governorate-General of Macedonia (Γενικὴ Διοίκησις Μακεδονίας) following the acquisition of Macedonia during the Balkan Wars. It was promoted to cabinet level in the late 1920s and renamed the Governorate-General of Northern Greece (Γενικὴ Διοίκησις Βορείου Ἑλλάδος) in 1945, after being merged with the Governorate-General of Thrace (Γενικὴ Διοίκησις Θρᾴκης).

It was renamed the Ministry of Northern Greece (Ὑπουργεῖον Βορείου Ἑλλάδος) in 1955. The third name change occurred in 1988, when it was renamed the Ministry of Macedonia and Thrace. In 2009, the ministry was downgraded to a General Secretariat within the Ministry of the Interior, until it was re-established as a separate ministry in 2012. With the legislative election of SYRIZA in January 2015, the ministry was once more subordinated to the Ministry of the Interior and Administrative Reconstruction, headed by a deputy minister.

Shortly after the Hellenic Army entered Thessaloniki on 26 October 1912, King Constantine I demanded that he be given control of the newly acquired region of Macedonia, but Prime Minister Eleftherios Venizelos had already decided that the fate of the region would lie with his minister of justice, Konstantinos Raktivan, who arrived in the city on 30 October. His position within the Governorate-General of Macedonia was so powerful that his power matched that of the prime minister and caused dismay among the other ministers in Athens. Raktivan was later succeeded by other prominent politicians of Greece, such as Stefanos Dragoumis, Emmanouil Repoulis and Themistoklis Sofoulis.

Despite its limited freedom of action in later years, the Governorate-General of Macedonia managed to produce an astonishing amount of work between its founding in 1912 and the creation of the Ministry of Northern Greece in 1955. Following the Great Thessaloniki Fire of 1917, the Governorate-General appointed Ernest Hébrard as the master architect for the redesign of the city. The Governorate-General was also responsible for the complete incorporation of Macedonia into the Greek state despite the difficult circumstances of the interwar period. Other successes of the Governorate-General at the time include the establishment of numerous government agencies, including the creation of Courts of Appeal, Courts of First Instance and District Courts, the creation of an independent archaeological department, a forestry department and public services, and the provision of shelter to hundreds of thousands of refugees after the population exchange between Greece and Turkey in the 1920s.

== The Ministry ==
=== Structure ===
According to Presidential Decree no. 167 (2 September 2005), the Ministry of Macedonia and Thrace was made up of the following departments:

- The Ministry of Macedonia and Thrace
  - The Office of Solicitor of the State
  - The Office of Financial Control
  - The Office of the Borderland
  - The Office of the Assessor of the Audit Office
  - The Office of the Deputy Minister
    - The Office of Defence and Political Planning in Case of Emergency
    - The Office of Public Relations, of the Press and of Etiquette
  - The Office of the Secretary-General
    - The Secretariat
      - The Office of Foreign Affairs, Defence, Policing and Justice

- Department of Cooperation with the countries of south-eastern Europe
- Department of European Affairs
- Department of the Diaspora
- Department of Defence and the Aegean
- Department of Policing and Justice

- The Office of Education, Culture and Citizen Protection
- The Office of the Economy and Tourism
- The Office of Infrastructure and the Environment
- The Office of Administrative Development and e-Governance
- The Office of the Media
- The Office of Quality and Efficiency
- The Office of Facilitation of People with Disabilities

- The Department of Inspection and Coordination of Services

=== Political leadership ===
Since the Metapolitefsi, there have been twenty Ministers for Macedonia and Thrace from two parties, New Democracy and PASOK. The first to assume the post following the fall of the military junta in 1974 was Nikolaos Martis. Stavros Kalafatis served as the last minister before the ministry's abolition upon the election of George Papandreou in 2009.

The ministry was re-established on 21 June 2012 after the election of Antonis Samaras, but was again absorbed by the Ministry of the Interior on 27 January 2015 after the election of Alexis Tsipras.

=== Role ===
The Ministry of Macedonia and Thrace is responsible for "the development of the border regions of Greece, giving Northern Greece the opportunity to acquire a voice and role in the political and economic processes". In particular, the ministry gathers information regarding the communities that fall under its jurisdiction and proceeds to propose and discuss legislation and policies with other government bodies.

== List of ministers ==
=== Northern Greece (1974–1988) ===
Name	Took office	Left office	Party
Nikolaos Martis	21 November 1974	21 October 1977	New Democracy
Dionysios Arbouzis	21 October 1977	28 November 1977	New Democracy
Nikolaos Martis	28 November 1977	21 October 1981	New Democracy
Vassilis Intzes	21 October 1981	5 June 1985	PASOK
Andreas Papandreou	5 June 1985	26 July 1985	PASOK
Giannis Papadopoulos	26 July 1985	5 February 1987	PASOK
Stelios Papathemelis	5 February 1987	19 August 1988	PASOK

=== Macedonia and Thrace (1988–2009) ===
Name	Took office	Left office	Party
Stelios Papathemelis	19 August 1988	2 July 1989	PASOK
Panayiotis Chatzinikolaou	2 July 1989	12 November 1989	New Democracy
Ioannis Deligiannis	12 November 1989	11 April 1990	New Democracy
Georgios Tzitzikostas	11 April 1990	8 August 1991	New Democracy
Panayiotis Chatzinikolaou	8 August 1991	13 October 1993	New Democracy
Constantinos Triaridis	13 October 1993	22 October 1996	PASOK
Philippos Petsalnikos	22 October 1996	30 October 1998	PASOK
Giannis Magriotis	30 October 1998	4 April 2000	PASOK
Georgios Paschalidis	13 April 2000	7 July 2003	PASOK
Charis Kastanidis	7 July 2003	3 March 2004	PASOK
Nikos Tsiartsionis	10 March 2004	15 February 2006	New Democracy
Georgios Kalantzis	15 February 2006	19 September 2007	New Democracy
Margaritis Tzimas	19 September 2007	8 January 2009	New Democracy
Stavros Kalafatis	8 January 2009	7 October 2009	New Democracy

=== Macedonia and Thrace (2012–2015) ===
Name	Took office	Left office	Party
Theodoros Karaoglou	21 June 2012	10 June 2014	New Democracy
Giorgos Orfanos	10 June 2014	27 January 2015	New Democracy
