= Ioannis Varvitsiotis =

Greek politician (1933–2026)

- Ιωάννης Βαρβιτσιώτης
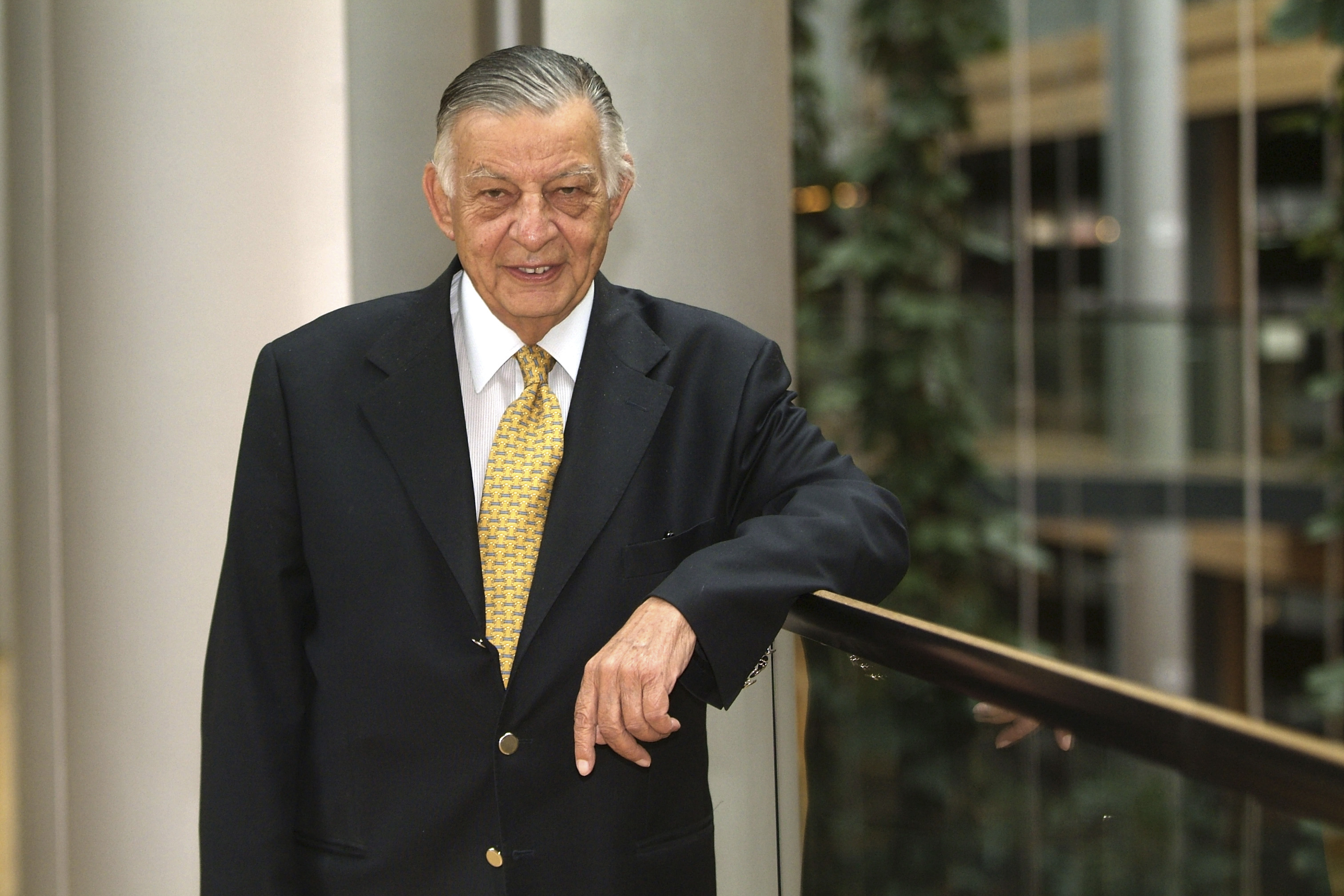

Minister of the National Defence
- In office 11 April 1990 – 13 October 1993
- Prime Minister: Konstantinos Mitsotakis
- Preceded by: Theodoros Degiannis
- Succeeded by: Gerasimos Arsenis
- In office 2 July 1989 – 12 October 1989
- Prime Minister: Tzannis Tzannetakis
- Preceded by: Ioannis Charalambopoulos
- Succeeded by: Theodoros Degiannis

Personal details
- Born: 2 August 1933 Athens, Greece
- Died: 2 August 2026 (aged 93) Athens, Greece
- Party: New Democracy
- Education: National and Kapodistrian University of Athens; University of Freiburg

Ioannis Varvitsiotis (Greek: Ιωάννης Βαρβιτσιώτης; 2 August 1933 – 2 August 2026) was a Greek politician. He was a Member of the European Parliament (MEP) for New Democracy from 2004 to 2009, part of the European People's Party and defense minister of Greece from 2 July 1989 till 7 October 1989 and from 11 April 1990 till 13 October 1993. He was also a member of the Hellenic Parliament from 1974 until 2004.

Varvitsiotis died on 2 August 2026, his 93rd birthday.

Political offices
Preceded by Ioannis Charalambopoulos	Minister for National Defence; 1989	Succeeded by Theodoros Degiannis
Preceded by Theodoros Degiannis	Minister for National Defence; 1990–1993	Succeeded by Gerasimos Arsenis
