= Argyrokastro Castle =

Coordinates: 37.684°N 22.132°E

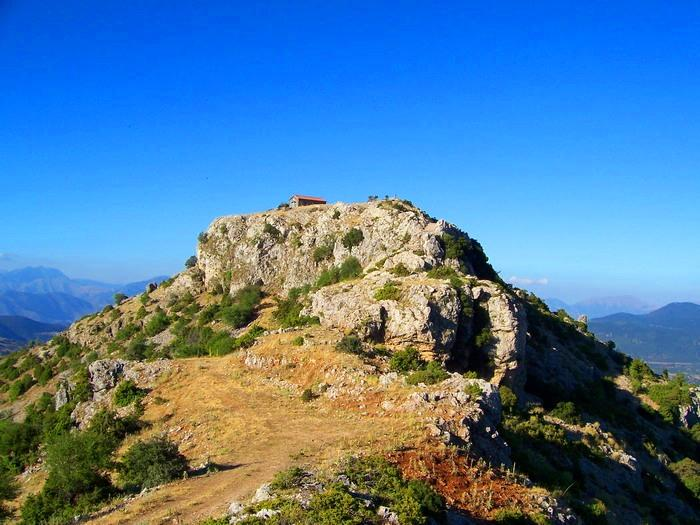

Argyrokastro (Greek: Αργυρόκαστρο, "silver castle") is a castle in the region of the Peloponnese, Greece. It is located in mountainous Arcadia, near the village of Magouliana, at an elevation of 1,450 m. It is also known as the Gortyniako dynamari (Γορτυνιακό δυναμάρι, "Gortynian stronghold").

The castle was erected during the Frankish rule by the Villehardouin dynasty of the Principality of Achaea, and served as their summer retreat.
