= Alexandros Othonaios =

Greek politician and general (1881–1970)

- Αλέξανδρος Οθωναίος
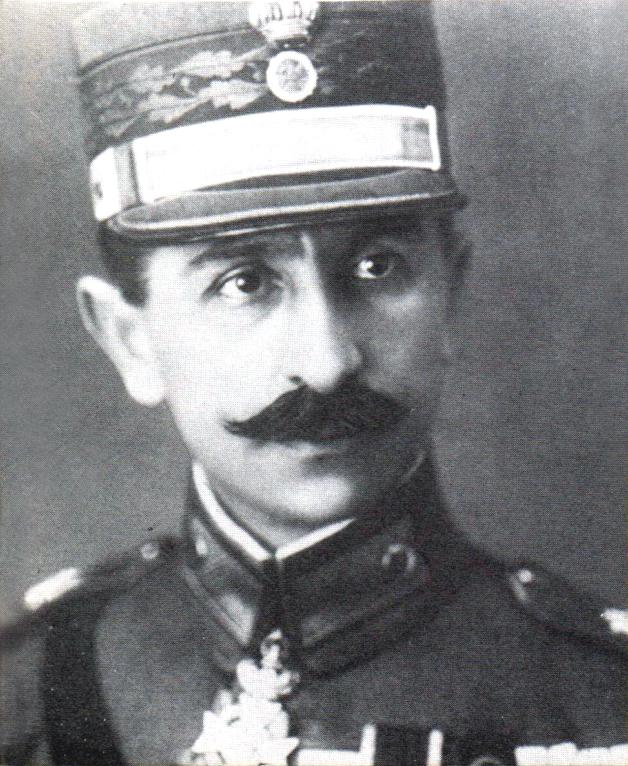
- Alexandros Othonaios c. early 1920s

Prime Minister of Greece
- In office 6 March 1933 – 10 March 1933
- President: Alexandros Zaimis
- Preceded by: Eleftherios Venizelos
- Succeeded by: Panagis Tsaldaris

Minister of Military Affairs
- In office 6 March 1933 – 10 March 1933
- President: Alexandros Zaimis
- Prime Minister: Himself
- Preceded by: Georgios Katechakis
- Succeeded by: Georgios Kondylis

Personal details
- Born: 11 September 1881 Gytheio, Kingdom of Greece
- Died: 20 September 1970 (aged 89) Athens, Greece
- Education: Hellenic Military Academy
- Awards: Commander of the Order of the Redeemer
- Nickname(s): Kapetan Palamidis; Καπετάν Παλαμήδης

Military service
- Allegiance: Kingdom of Greece; Second Hellenic Republic
- Branch/service: Hellenic Army
- Years of service: ?–1925
- Rank: Lieutenant General
- Commands: Kydoniai Division; II Army Corps; III Army Corps
- Battles/wars: Macedonian Struggle; Balkan Wars; First Balkan War; Second Balkan War; World War I; Macedonian front; Russian Civil War; Allied intervention in the Russian Civil War; Southern Front; Southern Russia Intervention; Soviet Invasion of Ukraine; Greco-Turkish War (1919–1922); Occupation of Smyrna

Alexandros Othonaios (Greek: Αλέξανδρος Οθωναίος; 11 September 1881 – 20 September 1970) was a distinguished Greek general, who became briefly the acting Prime Minister of Greece, heading an emergency government during an abortive coup d'état in 1933.

== Early life and career ==
Othonaios was born at Gytheion in 1881, and enrolled in the Hellenic Military Academy. He participated in the Macedonian Struggle with the nom de guerre of Kapetan Palamidis, and was a member of the Military League. He fought in the Balkan Wars, and sided with Eleftherios Venizelos during the National Schism, commanding the 7th Cretan Regiment in the Macedonian front of World War I. He also took part in the Allied intervention in the Russian Civil War in 1919 with the rank of colonel. Subsequently, he was appointed commanding officer of the Kydoniai Division and participated in the occupation of the Smyrna district in the early stages of the Asia Minor Campaign. After the electoral defeat of Venizelos in 1920, he was dismissed from the army and fled to Allied-occupied Constantinople, where he joined several other Venizelist officers.

== Later career ==
He was recalled after the catastrophic defeat and evacuation of the Greek forces in Asia Minor, which led to a military revolt led by Colonels Nikolaos Plastiras and Stylianos Gonatas in September 1922. Othonaios was appointed chief judge of the military tribunal that tried and convicted several prominent leaders of the anti-Venizelist camp to death (the infamous "Trial of the Six"). He was promoted to lieutenant general in 1923, commanding II and III Army Corps, but resigned after the coup of General Theodoros Pangalos in 1925.

He returned to the Army in 1928 as head of the Second Army Inspectorate. In 6–10 March 1933, he led the military government that was formed to confront an attempted coup by Plastiras. An outspoken Venizelist and Republican, he was again removed from the Army, along with many Republicans, in the aftermath of another failed Venizelist coup two years later. Subsequently, the monarchy was restored, and eventually a conservative dictatorship was established in Greece by General Ioannis Metaxas. During this period, and the Axis Occupation that followed, Othonaios remained in Greece, but engaged in no political activity. After Liberation in October 1944, he was placed as nominal commander-in-chief because of his democratic credentials, but the virulent political atmosphere, which soon led to the Greek Civil War, forced him to permanently resign in 1945.

Preceded by Eleftherios Venizelos	Prime Minister of Greece (interim); 6–10 March 1933	Succeeded by Panagis Tsaldaris
Preceded by Georgios Katechakis	Minister for Military Affairs of Greece (interim); 6–10 March 1933	Succeeded by Georgios Kondylis
