= Petros Voulgaris =

Greek Admiral and Prime Minister

- Πέτρος Βούλγαρης

Prime Minister of Greece
- In office 9 April 1945 – 17 October 1945
- Monarch: George II
- Regent: Archbishop Damaskinos
- Preceded by: Nikolaos Plastiras
- Succeeded by: Archbishop Damaskinos

Personal details
- Born: 13 September 1883 Hydra, Greece
- Died: 26 November 1957 Athens

Military service
- Allegiance: Greece
- Branch/service: Royal Hellenic Navy
- Years of service: 1903–21, 1922–25, 1926–35, 1943–45
- Rank: Vice Admiral
- Battles/wars: Balkan Wars (Elli), World War I, Allied intervention in the Russian Civil War, World War II

Petros Voulgaris (Greek: Πέτρος Βούλγαρης; 13 September 1883 – 26 November 1957) was a Greek Admiral who served briefly as Prime Minister of Greece in 1945. He was famous for his role in suppressing the 1944 Greek naval mutiny and restoring the fleet to combat readiness, for which he was awarded the Commander's Cross of the Cross of Valour.

== Life ==
=== Early career ===
He was born in the island of Hydra on 13 September 1883, to Georgios Voulgaris and Archonto Vatsaxi. After the death of his father in 1885, his family settled in Athens, with his mother's relatives.

After finishing school, he entered the Hellenic Naval Academy on 10 October 1899, and was commissioned as Ensign of the Line on 16 July 1903. In 1908–1910 he was detached for training abroad, and briefly served aboard the French Navy cruiser Ernest Renan in 1912. Promoted to Sub-Lieutenant on 29 March 1910, he participated in the Balkan Wars of 1912–13 aboard the destroyer Panthir, taking part in the Battle of Elli and the operations to capture Imbros, Samothrace, and Mount Athos. On 2 June 1913 he was promoted to lieutenant and to lieutenant first class on 16 July 1916, serving as adjutant to the Minister for Naval Affairs, Admiral Pavlos Kountouriotis (1915–16) and captain of the torpedo boat Thetis.

When the National Defence revolt broke out in Thessaloniki in August 1916, the pro-Venizelist Voulgaris, like his mentor and fellow Hydriot Kountouriotis, left Athens and joined the revolutionary government. On 26 December 1917 he was promoted to lieutenant commander, retroactive to 3 March. From 1916 to 1919 he commanded the destroyer Velos, participating in the Allied naval operations in the Aegean during World War I, the 1919 Allied Expedition to Ukraine, and the opening phase of the Asia Minor Campaign. In 1919–20 he served as adjutant and then as head of the private office of the Minister for Naval Affairs Athanasios N. Miaoulis, being promoted to commander on 22 March 1920.

After the Venizelist electoral defeat in November 1920, he was suspended from active service on 18 March 1921 by the new royalist government. Following the collapse of the Asia Minor front and the outbreak of the 11 September 1922 Revolution, he was recalled to active duty on 15 September. He then served as captain of the destroyer Leon (1922–23), commander of the Faliro Naval Aviation Base (1923), and captain of the Panthir (1923–24). He was one of the leaders of the so-called "Navy Strike" of June 1924, he resigned from the navy but was recommissioned on 21 August. On 28 August 1925, following the coup d'état of general Theodoros Pangalos, Voulgaris again resigned his commission, with the rank of captain in retirement. Following Pangalos' overthrow in August 1926, he re-entered service as having never retired. He was promoted to the rank of captain on 15 September 1926.

Voulgaris served as Superior Commander of Naval Aviation in 1926–30. When the Aviation Ministry was established in 1930, he became Director of the Air Force office in the ministry. In 1931, he was appointed commander of the Salamis Naval Base, and in 1931–34 he served as Superior Submarines Commander. In 1934, he was placed as military attaché to Ankara and Belgrade, based at Istanbul. It was there that the unsuccessful Venizelist coup attempt of March 1935 found him. Being a committed Venizelist, he was suspended (3 May) and then dismissed (30 July) by the subsequent purges of the armed forces. On 11 November 1935 however, with the return of the monarchy and a partial pardon, his dismissal was revoked and he was listed as placed in reserve, with the rank of rear admiral in retirement.

=== World War II and aftermath ===
For the next few years, he worked in the private sector, eventually working for the Greek industry magnate Prodromos Bodosakis-Athanasiadis in Egypt. On 6 May 1943, the Greek government in exile recalled him to service, alongside many other officers who had been expelled in 1935, and promoted him to Rear Admiral (retroactively since 26 February 1937). He was again retired on 15 September 1943 as a vice admiral in retirement. On 20 May 1943, he received the post of Aviation Minister in the cabinet of Emmanouil Tsouderos, which he held until 14 April 1944, when the Tsouderos cabinet resigned. With the ongoing pro-EAM Navy mutiny reaching its climax, on 20 April he was recalled to active service with the rank of vice admiral, and was placed as Chief of Fleet Command on the next day. From this position, he oversaw the violent recapture of the mutinied ships by officer detachments. In October 1944, he led the Greek fleet back to Greece, and assumed the duties of Chief of the Navy General Staff.

In the months after liberation, the political situation in Greece was extremely unstable: following month-long clashes between government and British forces and the guerrillas of EAM-ELAS, the Treaty of Varkiza had resulted in the latter's disarmament. However the situation remained explosive. The moderate government of Nikolaos Plastiras resigned under British pressure on 8 April 1945, and the Regent, Archbishop Damaskinos of Athens, appointed Voulgaris to head an interim government.

While remaining an active officer, Voulgaris headed two consecutive cabinets, from 8 April to 11 August, during which he also held the posts of Minister for Military Affairs, Naval Affairs, and Aviation, and from 11 August until 17 October, where he initially also headed the Interior and Foreign Affairs ministries, but gradually passed them on to civilian ministers. On 8 October 1945, he retired from active service for the last time.

On 1 July 1947, in recognition of his role in suppressing the Navy mutiny, rapidly restoring its combat effectiveness, and leading it again to home waters, he was awarded the highest Greek decoration for valour, the Commander's Cross of the Cross of Valour. He died in the Athens Naval Hospital on 26 November 1957 of heart failure and was buried in the First Cemetery of Athens.

Political offices
Preceded by Sofoklis Venizelos	Minister of Aviation (Government-in-exile); 20 May 1943 – 14 April 1944	Succeeded by Sofoklis Venizelos
Preceded by Nikolaos Plastiras	Prime Minister of Greece; 8 April – 17 October 1945	Succeeded by Archbishop Damaskinos of Athens
Preceded by Nikolaos Plastiras	Minister for Military Affairs; 8 April – 22 August 1944	Succeeded by Alexandros Merentitis
Preceded by Nikolaos Plastiras	Minister for Naval Affairs; 8 April – 17 October 1944	Succeeded by Alexandros Merentitis
Preceded by Nikolaos Plastiras	Minister of Aviation; 8 April – 17 October 1944	Succeeded by Georgios Alexandris
Vacant Title last held by Ioannis Sofianopoulos	Minister of Foreign Affairs; 11–18 August 1945	Succeeded by Ioannis Politis
Preceded by Konstantinos Tsatsos	Minister of the Interior; 11–30 August 1945	Succeeded by Petros Gounarakis
Military offices
Vacant Axis occupation of Greece Title last held by Rear Admiral Charalambos Delagrammatikas	Chief of the Navy General Staff; 3 September 1944 – 11 April 1945	Succeeded by Rear Admiral Grigorios Mezeviris
