= Kostis Gontikas =

Greek politician (1934–2024)

Kostis Gontikas or Gondikas (Greek: Κωστής Γόντικας, 1934 – 28 June 2024) was a Greek politician.

== Life and career ==
Kostis Gontikas was born in Athens in 1934, and was the son of Dimitrios Gontikas, a politician and president of the Greek parliament. He later studied at the Athens College and law at the University of Athens. He continued his studies at the University of Luxembourg. He was elected in 1974 and 1978 as MP of the Elis Prefecture, and in 1981 as a Member of the European Parliament (MEP), with the New Democracy Party.

Gontikas was married and had three children. He died on 28 June 2024, at the age of 90.
