= Ioannis Deligiannis =

Ioannis Deligiannis may refer to:

- Ioannis Deligiannis (politician) (c. 1815–1876), Greek politician
- Ioannis Deligiannis (1738–1816)
