= Dimitrios Gontikas =

Greek politician

Dimitrios Gontikas Δημήτριος Γόντικας
- Born: 1888; Magouliana, Arcadia, Greece
- Died: 1967
- Occupation: politician

Dimitrios Gontikas or Gondikas (Greek: Δημήτριος Γόντικας; 1888–1967) was a Greek politician and Speaker of the Hellenic Parliament.

== Biography ==
Gontikas was born in the village of Magouliana in Arcadia. After studying law at the University of Athens, he spent many years as a lawyer in Pyrgos until 1936, when he was as MP for Elis Prefecture with the Liberal Party ticket. He was re-elected to Parliament with the Liberal Party in the elections of 1946, 1950, 1951 and 1958, with the Liberal Democratic Union 1956 and with the National Radical Union in 1961.

He occupied various ministerial in several cabinets. He was Supply Minister under Themistoklis Sophoulis (18 November 1948 – 20 January 1949) and Sophoklis Venizelos (23 March – 15 April 1950), and briefly (15–19 April 1950) Minister without Portfolio in the Nikolaos Plastiras cabinet. In 1950–52, he also served as Speaker of the Hellenic Parliament. Gontikas was also chairman of the Greek–American Institute of Athens and of the Greek–Yugoslav Union.

Dimitrios Gontikas was married and had two sons: Kostis, a member of parliament, and Ilias.

Political offices
Preceded by Praxitelis Moutzouridis	Speaker of the Hellenic Parliament; 4 April 1950 – 10 October 1952	Succeeded by Ioannis Makropoulos
Preceded by Ioannis Papakyriakopoulos as Minister for National Economy, Supply and Distribution	Minister for Supply and Distribution of Greece; 23 March – 15 April 1950	Succeeded by Konstantinos Manetas
Preceded by Stavros Kostopoulos	Minister for Supply and Distribution of Greece; 18 November 1948 – 20 January 1949	Succeeded by Evangelos Averoff
