= Deputy Minister for Macedonia and Thrace =

Government deputy minister of Greece

Deputy Minister for Macedonia and Thrace of the Hellenic Republic
- Υφυπουργός Μακεδονίας και Θράκης
- Coat of arms of the Hellenic Republic

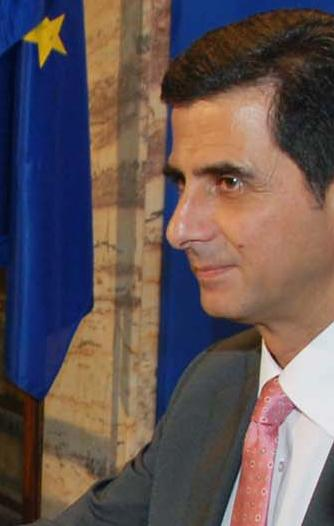
- Incumbent; Kostas Gkioulekas since 14 June 2024
- Appointer: Prime Minister of Greece
- Inaugural holder: Maria Kollia-Tsaroucha
- Formation: 27 January 2015
- Website: www.mathra.gr

The deputy minister for Macedonia and Thrace (Greek: Υφυπουργός Μακεδονίας και Θράκης, romanized: Yfypourgós Makedonías kai Thrákīs) is the government minister in charge of Greece's Sub-Ministry of Macedonia and Thrace, part of the Ministry of the Interior.

The department originated in the old Ministry of Northern Greece, which was renamed the Ministry of Macedonia and Thrace on 19 August 1988.

The ministry was abolished on 7 October 2009 and downgraded to a general secretariat within the Ministry of the Interior, but was re-established on 21 June 2012. On 27 January 2015, it was again demoted to a sub-ministry within the Ministry of the Interior.

== List of deputy ministers for Macedonia and Thrace (since 2015) ==
| Name | Took office | Left office | Party |
|---|---|---|---|
| Maria Kollia-Tsaroucha | 27 January 2015 | 27 August 2015 | Independent Greeks |
| Filippos Tsalidis | 28 August 2015 | 21 September 2015 | Independent |
| Maria Kollia-Tsaroucha | 23 September 2015 | 29 August 2018 | Independent Greeks |
| Katerina Notopoulou | 29 August 2018 | 15 February 2019 | Syriza |
| Eleftheria Hatzigeorgiou | 15 February 2019 | 9 July 2019 | Syriza |
| Theodoros Karaoglou | 9 July 2019 | 5 January 2021 | New Democracy |
| Stavros Kalafatis | 5 January 2021 | 26 May 2023 | New Democracy |
| Stathis Konstantinidis | 27 June 2023 | 14 June 2024 | New Democracy |
| Kostas Gkioulekas | 14 June 2024 | | New Democracy |
