= Tzannis Tzannetakis =

Greek politician

Tzanis Tzanetakis
- Τζανής Τζανετάκης

Prime Minister of Greece
- In office 2 July 1989 – 12 October 1989
- President: Christos Sartzetakis
- Preceded by: Andreas Papandreou
- Succeeded by: Ioannis Grivas (caretaker)

Minister for Foreign Affairs
- In office 3 July 1989 – 12 October 1989
- Prime Minister: Himself
- Preceded by: Karolos Papoulias
- Succeeded by: Georgios Papoulias

Personal details
- Born: 13 September 1927 Gytheio, Greece
- Died: 1 April 2010 (aged 82) Athens, Greece
- Resting place: First Cemetery of Athens
- Citizenship: Greece
- Party: New Democracy
- Spouse: Maria Rangoussi (m. 1954; died 2004)
- Children: 2

Tzanibeis "Tzanis" Tzannetakis (Greek: Τζανήμπεης "Τζανής" Τζανετάκης; 13 September 1927 – 1 April 2010) was a Greek politician who was briefly Prime Minister of Greece during the political crisis of 1989. He also served as a submarine commander in the Hellenic Navy.

== Biography ==
Tzanetakis was born in Gytheio in the region of Mani in 1927. He served as a military officer but resigned on 22 April 1967, the day after the military coup d'état which brought the dictatorship of Georgios Papadopoulos to power. He was imprisoned by the military junta from 1969 to 1971 for his resistance activity.

When democracy was restored in 1974, Tzannetakis joined the New Democracy party of Constantine Karamanlis. From 1974 to 1977 he served as General Secretary of the Ministry of Tourism. He was elected to the Greek Parliament in 1977 and served as Minister for Public Works in the government of Georgios Rallis (1980–81).

== Prime minister ==
The June 1989 Greek legislative election left the PASOK party of Andreas Papandreou in the minority, following a series of corruption scandals, including Koskotas scandal. New Democracy, however, now led by Constantine Mitsotakis, could not form a government despite its significant lead in the popular vote because of changes to Greek electoral law that PASOK had voted into effect just before the elections. The result was the formation of the first coalition government since the fall of the Greek dictatorship in 1974, and the first government to include the Communist left since 1944.

The government was based on an alliance between ND and the Coalition of Forces of the Left and Progress (Synaspismos), which then included the Communist Party of Greece, with a mandate to conduct a clean-up ("katharsis") after the scandals. The agreement was for a short-term government that would last only until the process of parliamentary investigation of those Members of Parliament accused of involvement in the scandals had been completed. Tzannetakis was a compromise candidate for Prime Minister, given that the left refused to accept Mitsotakis in this role. In contrast, Tzannetakis was acceptable to the left because of his credentials from the anti-Junta resistance. In addition to the premiership, Tzannetakis also retained the portfolios of Foreign Affairs and of Tourism.

The formation of a government bringing together the Greek right and the communist left symbolized national reconciliation after the 1940s civil war. One of the government's acts was to burn all the secret police files held on Greek citizens during the post-Civil War period.

The parliamentary investigation into the scandals concluded with lifting the parliamentary immunity of several former government ministers, including former Prime Minister Andreas Papandreou himself, and their referral to the justice system. This was the first time a former Greek Prime Minister had been referred for trial.

The Tzannetakis government also abolished the state monopoly on TV broadcasting and allowed private TV stations to function for the first time.

== Aftermath ==
In accordance with the initial agreement among the coalition partners, the government resigned in October. Yiannis Grivas then formed a caretaker government until fresh elections could be held. New Democracy won these elections, too, but once more could not form a government despite tallying 46% of the vote, with PASOK coming second with 40%. In November, an "ecumenical government," headed by Xenophon Zolotas, with the participation of all three political parties (New Democracy, PASOK, Synaspismos) was formed, again with an agreement for a short-term mandate to last until the election of the President of the Republic, due the following March. In the Zolotas government, Tzannis Tzannetakis served as Minister for Tourism and National Defence. In the election of April 1990, for the third consecutive time within a year, New Democracy won, this time with an even more significant lead of 8% over PASOK, securing the party a one-seat majority. In the Mitsotakis government, Tzannetakis became Deputy Prime Minister, a post he held until the government fell in 1993. He remained a Member of the Greek Parliament until September 2007, when he announced his intention to retire from political activity.

Tzanetakis died in Athens, on 1 April 2010, at age 82.

Political offices
Preceded by Stefanos Manos	Minister for Public Works; 1980–1981	Succeeded by Athanasios Apostolos
Preceded by Karolos Papoulias	Minister for Foreign Affairs; 1989	Succeeded by Georgios Papoulias
Preceded by Andreas Papandreou	Prime Minister of Greece; 1989	Succeeded by Ioannis Grivas
Preceded by Theodoros Degiannis	Minister for National Defence; 1989–1990	Succeeded by Theodoros Degiannis
Preceded by Georgios Mylonas	Minister for Culture; 1990–1991	Succeeded by Anna Benaki-Psarouda
Vacant Title last held by Ioannis Charalambopoulos; Menios Koutsogiorgas	Deputy Prime Minister of Greece; 1990–1993; Served alongside: Athanasios Kanellopoulos (1990–1992)	Vacant Title next held by Theodoros Pangalos
