= Mylonas =

Mylonas (Greek: Μυλωνάς) is a Greek and Cypriot Greek family name with the etymological meaning "miller." The genitive case form Mylona (Μυλωνά) is also used for female name-bearers.
Notable people with this surname include:

- Alex Mylona
- Eleni Mylonas (born 1944), Greek-born American artist
- George E. Mylonas (1898–1988), Greek archaeologist
- Georgios Mylonas (1919–1998), Greek politician
- Harris Mylonas (born 1978), Greek-born American political scientist
- Konstantinos Mylonas (1916–2010), Greek former sports shooter
