= Leon Kelly =

American painter (1901–1982)

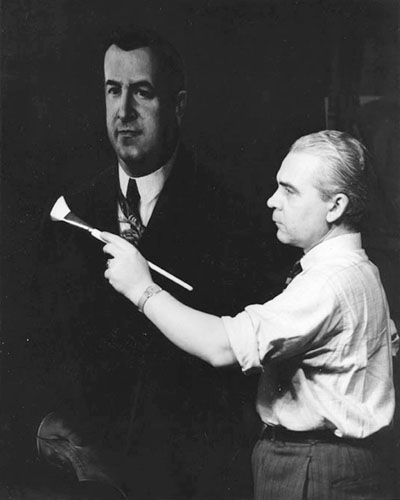
- Leon Kelly paints a portrait of former Mexican President Manuel Avila Camacho, 1942
- Born: Leon Kelly; 21 October 1901; Philadelphia, Pennsylvania
- Died: 5 September 1982 (aged 80); Loveladies, New Jersey, US
- Occupations: Painter, Draftsman, Muralist

Leon Kelly (October 21, 1901 – June 28, 1982) was an American artist born in Philadelphia, Pennsylvania. He is most well known for his contributions to American Surrealism, but his work also encompassed styles such as Cubism, Social Realism, and Abstraction. Reclusive by nature, a character trait that became more exaggerated in the 1940s and later, Kelly's work reflects his determination not to be limited by the trends of his time. His large output of paintings is complemented by a prolific number of drawings that span his career of 50 years. Some of the collections where his work is represented are the Metropolitan Museum in New York, The Whitney Museum of American Art, the Museum of Modern Art, the Philadelphia Museum of Art, and Boston Public Library.

== Biography ==
Kelly was born in 1901 at home at 1533 Newkirk Street, Philadelphia, Pennsylvania. He was the only child of Elizabeth (née Stevenson) and Pantaleon L. Kelly. The family resided in Philadelphia where Pantaleon and two of his cousins owned Kelly Brothers, a successful tailoring business. The prosperity of the firm enabled his father to purchase a 144-acre farm in Bucks County, Pennsylvania in 1902, which he named "Rural Retreat" It was here that Pantaleon took Leon to spend every weekend away from the pressures of business and from the disappointments in his failing marriage. Idyllic and peaceful memories of the farm stayed with Leon and embued his work with a love of nature that emerged later in the Lunar Series, in Return and Departure, and in the insect imagery of his Surrealist work. "If anything," he once said,"I am a Pantheist and see a spirit in everything, the grass, the rocks, everything."

At thirteen, Kelly left school and began private painting lessons with Albert Jean Adolphe, a teacher at the School of Industrial Art (now the University of the Arts) in Philadelphia. He learned technique by copying the works of the old masters and visiting the Philadelphia Zoo, where he would draw animals. Drawings done in 1916 and 1917 of elephants, snakes and antelope, as well as copies of old master paintings by Holbein and Michelangelo, heralded an impressive emerging talent. In 1917, he studied sculpture with Alexander Portnoff but his studies came to an abrupt halt with the start of World War I. Being too young to enlist, he joined the Quartermaster Corp at the Army Depot in Philadelphia, where he served for more than a year loading ships with supplies and, along with other artists, working on drawings for camouflage.

By 1920, the family's fortunes drastically changed. His father's business had failed due to the introduction of ready made clothing and his marriage, unhappy from the beginning, dissolved. Broken by circumstance, Pantaleon left Philadelphia to begin a wandering existence looking for work leaving Kelly to support his mother and grandmother. He found a job in 1920 at the Freihofer Baking Company where he worked nights for the next four years. Under these circumstances Kelly continued to develop his skills in drawing and painting and learned of the revolutionary developments in art that were taking place in Paris.

During the day he was granted permission to study anatomy at the Philadelphia School of Osteopathy where he dissected a cadaver and perfected his knowledge of the human figure. He also met and studied etching with Earl Horter, a well-known illustrator, who had amassed a significant collection of modern art which included work by Brancusi, Matisse, and Cubist works by Picasso and Braque. Among the artists around Horter was Arthur Carles, a charismatic and controversial painter who taught at the Pennsylvania Academy of Fine Arts. Kelly enrolled in the Academy in 1922, becoming what Carles described as "his best student".

In the next three years Kelly's work ranged from academic studies of plaster casts, to pointillism, to landscapes of Fairmount Park in Philadelphia, as well as a series of pastels showing influences from Matisse to Picasso. Influenced by Earl Horter's collection and Arthur Carles, he mastered analytical cubism in works such as The Three Pears (1923) and in 1925 experimented with Purism in Moon Behind the Italian House. In 1925 Kelly was awarded a Cresson Scholarship and on June 14 he left for Europe.

=== Paris ===
The first trip to Europe lasted for approximately three and a half months and introduced Kelly to a culture and place where he felt he belonged. Though he returned to the Academy in the autumn, he left for Europe again a few months later to begin a four-year stay in Paris. He moved into an apartment at 19 rue Daguerre in Paris and began an existence intellectually rich but in creature comforts, very poor. "I kept a cinderblock over the drain in the kitchen sink to keep the rats out of the apartment" he once explained. He frequented the cafes making acquaintances with Henry Miller, James Joyce and the critic Félix Fénéon as well as others. His days were split between copying old master paintings in the Louvre and pursuing modernist ideas that were swirling through the work of all the artists around him.

Patrons during this time were the police official Leon Zamaran, a collector of Courbets, Lautrecs and others, who began collecting Kelly's work. Another was Albert C. Barnes of the Barnes Collection in Philadelphia.

In 1929 Kelly married a young French woman, Henriette D'Erfurth. She appears frequently in paintings and drawings done between 1928 and the early 1930s.

=== Philadelphia ===
The stock market crash of 1929 made it impossible to continue living in Paris and Kelly and Henriette returned to Philadelphia in 1930. He rented a studio on Thompson Street and began working and participating in shows in the city's galleries. Work from 1930 to 1940 showed continuing influences and experimentation with the themes and techniques acquired in Paris as well as a brief foray into Social Realism. The Little Gallery of Contemporary Art purchased the Absinthe Drinker in 1931 and in 1932 exhibited Judgement of Paris (1932), an ambitious painting with a classical theme. In October 1934, "Interior of a Slaughter House" and several other works were included in "Second Regional Exhibition of Painting and Prints by Philadelphia Artists" at the Whitney Museum in New York.

Kelly joined the Philadelphia Public Works of Art Project and worked on sketches for a mural destined for the School Administration Building. While some sketches survived, one is in the Metropolitan, the mural is lost. The harsh financial conditions of Kelly's life continued and by the late 1930s, Henriette, who spoke no English and whose only companionship outside the home was Helen Lloyd Horter (who spoke French), returned to France permanently When his divorce was finalized, Kelly began seeing Helen Lloyd Horter, a Philadelphia painter and a fellow student at the Academy and who was now the ex-wife of Earl Horter. In 1941 they married.

Kelly continued to work in his studio on Brandywine Street in Philadelphia teaching small classes to gain some income. Kelly's study of the masters in the Louvre collection resulted in great admiration for the Renaissance painter Leonardo da Vinci. His influence is evident in Kelly's notebooks of this time which are full of drawings for World War II battlements and weaponry which echo Leonardo's drawings for the mechanisms of war. He also shared Leonardo's fascination with science and the underlying dynamics of how things work. His interest of the nervous system and sensory aspects of human anatomy would later come important components of his abstract figures of the 1950s and '60s.

=== Surrealism ===
In 1942, Kelly moved out of Philadelphia to Helen's summer home in Harvey Cedars on Long Beach Island, New Jersey. In the 1940s, Harvey Cedars was a sparsely inhabited outpost. A small artists colony existed during summers in the town but in the winter it was reclaimed by the year round population of clammers, dredgers and fishermen. With its wind swept beaches, open expanses of sky, and undisturbed stretches of marsh, Long Beach Island was the perfect place for Kelly to reconnect with the natural environment he had loved as a child on his father's farm. In the stillness of this place his observations of dragonflies, birds and insects in the garden began to translate into a delicacy of line and a language of shapes that would come to characterize his paintings and especially his drawings.

In 1940, Helen Horter had contacted Julien Levy, a Harvard classmate of her brother-in-law Paul Vanderbilt, to propose an exhibition of drawings by Kelly. Levy's gallery, The Julien Levy Gallery on 57th street in New York was at the forefront of innovation and Surrealism. His stable included Salvador Dalí, Arshile Gorky, Yves Tanguy, Roberto Matta, Max Ernst, Joseph Cornell and Marcel Duchamp. Levy was impressed by Kelly's work and began representing him. His first show was an exhibition that travelled to the Art Alliance in Philadelphia in 1941. A one-man show followed in March 1942 in New York. In 1943, the magazine View printed nudes by Kelly and Picasso that resulted in the banning the issue in the US. In 1944, there was a second one-man show at the Julien Levy Gallery.

One of the hallmarks of Kelly's surrealist work are the enormous mosquitos that stalked the canvases. These gigantic insects and their surroundings are meticulously rendered, giving plausibility to the idea that they may, in fact, exist in some undiscovered landscape. One had only to spend a summer evening outdoors in Southern New Jersey to appreciate that the size of these creatures was in part an allegory for their relentless savagery. While mosquitos dominated Kelly's Surrealist work, other creatures began to appear such as beetles, birds and, later, a horses in a series of drawings made for his daughter Paula, The Butterfly Horse, Birth of Pegasus.

In 1944 Kelly painted The Plateau of Chess for Julien Levy's exhibit entitled "Imagery of Chess" which opened December 12, 1944. The concept for the show was formulated by Marcel Duchamp and Levy and they invited 32 artists (the number of chess pieces in a set) to participate. The show included new designs for chessmen as well as surreal dreamscapes incorporating chess imagery. On the night of January 6, 1945, a blindfolded chess match was begun with chess master George Koltanowski pitted against several of the artists and Julien Levy himself. Kelly, who did not play chess, confined his participation to a painting of a double landscape, the dominant larger one depicting a receding plane marked out as a chessboard surrounded by dark spindly leafless trees and cliffs. Below it was a broader view of the same landscape but on a much smaller scale.

As Kelly settled into life on the island his work continued to evolve. His relationship with nature intensified and the impressions from it were woven into the several series of paintings: Return and Departure, and the Lunar series. The Return and Departure series was done in the mid 1940s as a reaction to the seasonal ebb and flow of life on the barrier island, the flow of tides, the migration of birds and butterflies and the influx of summer visitors who retreated again in the Fall. Birds in particular begin to appear in his work as symbolic of the fugitive and ephemeral. "Birds and their mystic and silent relationship to the elements. They come and go like the spiritual counterparts of human beings. Down out of infinite space to stand for a moment like the apparition of the soul." He further wrote "People who come to me from a thin thread and then leave and in their departure diminish to a fine thread. These paintings were made on the seaboard and relate to a feeling of people coming and going away from a little platform in eternity and infinite space." See "Atlantic Pastorale", 1944, which is a preliminary sketch for a painting of the same name done in 1945. Abstract representations of figures vary in size and are scattered across the page to denote the appearance of their approach and departure.

In 1946 The Whitney purchased two paintings from this period: "Departure Under the Umbrellas" and "Magic Bird". Though Levy closed his gallery in 1949 and left New York to take up residence in Connecticut, he and Kelly continued a friendship and working relationship through the 1950s.

=== Peruvian Series ===
In the Spring of 1946, Kelly took a teaching job at the Brooklyn Museum School. Here he came in contact with their collection of Peruvian textilesand its impact changed his direction for the next several years. Kelly had concluded that American artists had been under the influence of Europe for too long and was looking for another visual tradition that would be closer to the American experience. He found it in the textiles and began studying Peruvian civilization and art. In 1947 he moved west to teach art at the University of Wyoming in Laramie, Wyoming, where he stayed for two years. On a Christmas vacation from teaching he traveled to New Mexico to visit family friend Edith Warner and the San Ildefonso Indians.

From these influences Kelly merged colors and shapes with cultural references from Indian cultures to come up with his own iconography. Of these paintings he wrote: " ...in developing my work from the pre-incaic themes I did not wish to lose or sacrifice in any way contemporary methods or concepts of painting." One of the main characteristics of this phase was the use of flat shadowless shapes similar to those seen in the textiles. He wrote "this provided for me an unusual feeling of detachment of the figures and objects from a positive earthly connection." Titles of some of the work done under this influence are: "The Priest with Apparition of a Virgin" (1949), "The Solitary Prince", and "Priest and the Virgin Weaver of Cuzco" (1947). Several works of this period were exhibited at a one-man show at the Hugo Gallery in a New York in 1950.

=== 1950s and beyond ===
George Balanchine attended the opening of the show at the Hugo Gallery. Accompanying him was George Volodine, a fellow dancer who had immigrated with him to the United States. Volodine operated a dance school in Westport CT where he prepared students for auditions with the New York City Ballet. Kelly and Volodine struck up a friendship that lasted for over a decade and resulted in collaboration on costume and set designs. Notebooks full of drawings trace the progress for the ballet "Flame", as well as proposals for other productions. "Flame" was produced in Westport in 1950. In the 1950s Kelly was often living alone in Harvey Cedars. Strains in his marriage had resulted in the periodic separations from Helen and his daughter Paula. In the 1950s the island was sparsely inhabited, especially during the winter, so the months alone must have seemed very long. The Lunar series was born out of the experience of the quiet nights when Kelly and his dog Rusty would walk down the street to the bay before bed. The moon, as it rose over the flat landscape and cycled through its phases, suggested the shape of the figures that began to populate his canvases. Combined with the delicate line inspired by insects physiology, the lunar figures described an emotional response to the moon's pale nocturnal presence.

Kelly's work had come into its own and the various influences of the forties jelled into a distinctive style. In subsequent years his work is distinguished by a quality of drawing that bore out Alfred Barr's opinion in 1944 that "Kelly was one of the best American draftsmen". The environment of the island provided Kelly with abundant subject matter from still life to bathers who were transformed into abstract frolicking designs reminiscent of the Lunar figures.

In 1960 Kelly was awarded the William and Noma Copley Foundation grant and lived for a year in Mallorca, Spain. A trip to North Africa during this time resulted in themes of veiled figures such as those seen in a large drawing "The Harem in Generalife", 1963, currently in a New York City collection.

After leaving the Julien Levy Gallery, Kelly was represented by the Alexander Iolas Gallery in New York and had an exhibition of drawings in Milan in 1952. In 1956 he exhibited with the Edwin Hewitt Gallery in New York. Other gallery affiliations include: Zabriski, The Washburn Gallery, Berry Hill Gallery and currently Francis Naumann Gallery and Betty Krulick Gallery in New York City. In 1981 the Metropolitan Museum of Art in New York bought "Vista at the Edge of the Sea", 1940. Kelly died in 1982 at his home on Long Beach Island.

The photographer Pete Muller is Kelly's grandson.
