= MOMus-Museum Alex Mylona =

Art museum in Athens, Greece

Coordinates: 37°58′40″N 23°43′18″E

The MOMus-Museum Alex Mylonas (Department of Contemporary Sculpture of MOMus-Museum of Contemporary Art-Macedonian Museum of Contemporary Art and State Museum of Contemporary Art collections, Greek: MOMus-Μουσείο Άλεξ Μυλωνά) is an art museum located in Athens, in the area of Thiseion. It is part of the Metropolitan Organisation of Thessaloniki Fine Arts Museums (MOMus).

== Location ==
The museum is located between the neighbourhoods of Thiseion and Psirri and it is housed in a restored neo-classical building with Art Nouveau elements dating from 1920 which was designed by the architect Vassilios Tsagris and was subsequently acquired in 1992 by the sculptor Alex Mylona.

== History ==
The museum was founded in 2004 as the Museum of Contemporary Art Alex Mylona to showcase the work and life of the Greek sculptor Alex Mylona (1923 - 2016) and to provide a venue for young artists. The museum's permanent collection includes works from Mylona's long artistic career, such as sculptures, but also drawings, paintings, collages, tapestries and prints. The museum also organizes temporary exhibitions, workshops. lectures and other events.

In 2007 the museum became part of the Macedonian Museum of Contemporary Art of Thessaloniki. Since 2018, it has been one of the five museums/cultural sites of the Metropolitan Organization of Thessaloniki Fine Art Museums.
