= Alexis Akrithakis =

Greek artist (1939–1994)

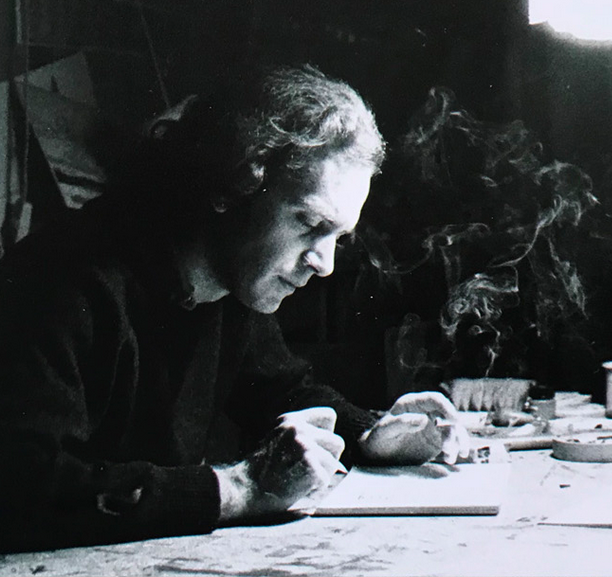
- Born: 11 May 1934; Athens, Greece
- Died: 18 September 1994 (aged 60); Athens, Greece
- Education: Académie de la Grande Chaumière
- Mother: Renée Stantzou

Alexis Akrithakis (Greek: Αλέξης Ακριθάκης; 11 May 1934 – 18 September 1994) was a Greek contemporary artist renowned for his paintings and wooden constructions.

== Biography ==
He was born in Athens, where he began his career. In 1968, he received a scholarship from DAAD and moved to Berlin. In 1972, his works were presented at the exhibition Szene Berlin Mai ’72 at Württembergischer Kunstverein in Stuttgart curated by Christos M. Joachimides and co-organized with the René Block gallery.

Throughout the '70s he collaborated extensively with the prolific gallerist Alexander Iolas. Iolas exhibited Akrithakis' work in shows organized in Geneva (1971), Milan (1973), Turin (1973) and Athens (1971,1977)

He created drawings for publications of key figures of Greek literature, poetry and philosophy such as Nanos Valaoritis, Kostas Tachtsis, Elias Petropoulos et al. In 2018 this aspect of his work was the subject of an exhibition organized by the Municipal Gallery of Athens in the framework of the Athens 2018 World Book Capital, curated by Denys Zacharopoulos.

His work has been included in major institutionally organized exhibitions such as the 12th Biennale of Alexandria held in the Alexandria Museum of Fine Art in Egypt, and Europalia 1982 at the Bozar, Brussels, Belgium. In Greece his work has been included in major shows organized by the National Art Gallery–Alexandros Soutzos Museum such as Metamorphoses of the Modern. The Greek experience in 1992 as well as at the founding exhibition of the Macedonian Museum of Contemporary Art in Thessaloniki in 1984. His last solo exhibition was at the Ileana Tounta Gallery in Athens.

After his heart attack and subsequent death in 1994 both National Gallery and MMCA organized large scale retrospective shows (Thessaloniki, 1997 and Athens, 1998) of his already recognized and critically acclaimed work.

His works have been described as "speaking an unmistakable language. They stand on their own and are original, but are yet influenced by the particular Zeitgeist - between Arte Povera and Actioninsm".

In 2003 The Neue Nationalgalerie in Berlin honored him with a large scale retrospective show that ran at the same time with an exhibition of works of Pablo Picasso in the same museum.

His work Eight Suitcases with Rubbish from a Beach was featured in Antidoron, an exhibition of the collection of National Museum of Contemporary Art of Athens, Greece presented in Kassel, Germany as a part of the Documenta 14 art exhibition.
