= Costas Tsoclis Museum =

Greek art museum

Coordinates: 37.5780°N 25.1494°E

The Costas Tsoclis Municipal Foundation Museum (Greek: Δημοτικό Ίδρυμα Μουσείο Κώστα Τσόκλη) is a contemporary art museum on the island of Tinos, dedicated to the work of the Greek visual artist Costas Tsoclis.

== History ==
The museum was founded in 2011 through the efforts of the artist and the Municipality of Tinos. It is located in the village of Kampos, a few kilometers northwest of Chora. It is housed in the renovated building of the old primary school, which was remodeled starting in 2008 with the assistance of architect Manos Perrakis. The museum was further expanded with the addition of a neighboring building that belonged to the Tsoclis family.

The museum's premises consist, externally, of the small theater (designed by Manos Perrakis) and the courtyard, where the installation St. George—a 1990 work by Tsoclis—stands out and, internally, of three exhibition halls. The galleries are dedicated to the respective current temporary exhibition, the permanent collection, and a retrospective of Tsoclis’ career. The museum is open to the public from 1 June through 30 September each year, as well as during the Easter holiday period.

The museum's purpose is to preserve, present, and study the work of Costas Tsoclis and to promote contemporary visual arts through collaborations, periodic exhibitions, educational programs, and cultural events. At the heart of the museum are the 45 works which the artist donated to the Municipality of Tinos. As a foundation, the Costas Tsoclis Museum has collaborated with organizations and institutions such as the Greek Parliament, the National Museum of Contemporary Art (EMST), and others. At the same time, it hosts annual temporary exhibitions covering different periods of the artist's career.
