= Pete Muller (photographer) =

American filmmaker, visual artist and professor

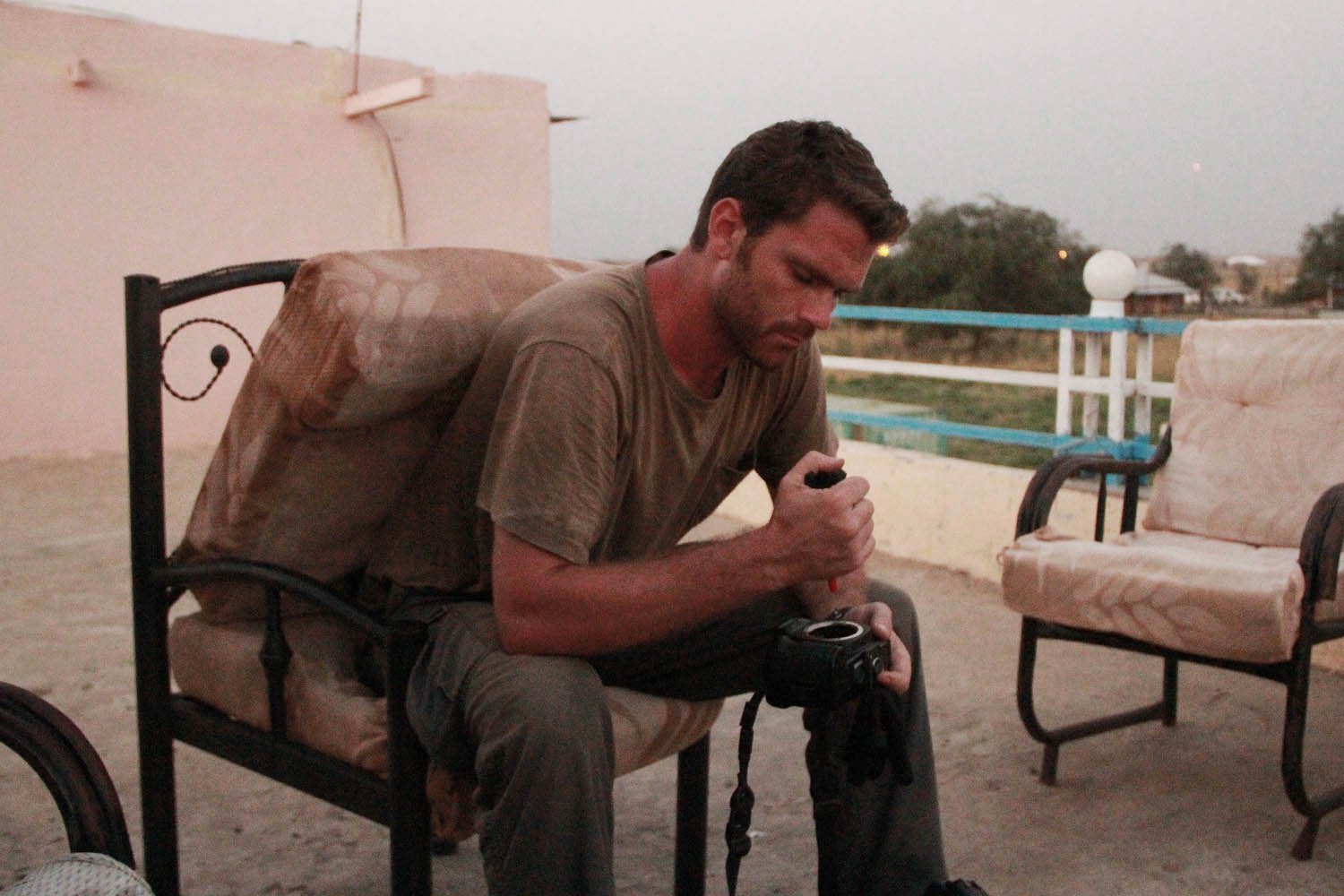
- Muller in Melut, central Sudan 2010
- Born: Peter Kelly Muller; February 17, 1982 (age 44); Newton, Massachusetts, U.S.
- Occupations: Photographer, producer, professor, researcher
- Years active: 2005-present
- Relatives: Leon Kelly (maternal grandfather)

Pete Muller is an American photographer, filmmaker, visual artist and professor based in New York City and Portland, Maine. His work focuses on masculinity, conflict and human ecology. He has won awards from World Press Photo, Pictures of the Year International, The Overseas Press Club and others. He is a current storytelling fellow at the National Geographic Society.

Muller is a contributing photographer to The New York Times, The Washington Post, National Geographic Magazine and other leading photographic outlets. He has provided media support for human rights and development organizations such as the International Criminal Court, Amnesty International, Human Rights Watch, UNICEF, Norwegian People's Aid and others.

During 2020–21, Muller co-produced the critically acclaimed documentary film The First Wave, with director Matthew Heineman, which chronicles the harrowing initial months of the COVID crisis in New York City. The film was acquired and distributed by National Geographic and shortlisted for the 94th Academy Awards. The First Wave won three Emmy Awards in 2022, including for Best Documentary.

== Life and work ==
Muller was born in Massachusetts and grew up between that state and New Jersey. His mother was a newspaper photographer working for the Lynn Daily Evening Item, the Lynn Sunday Post, the Beach Haven Times and other outlets. His father was the art conservator for the Princeton University Art Museum. His parents pursuits introduced him to a mix of documentary photography and conventional fine art, which heavily influenced his photographic approach. His maternal grandfather, Leon Kelly, was one of the pioneers of Surrealist painting in the United States.

Muller earned a bachelor's degree from the American University in Washington D.C. where he studied history and international peace and conflict resolution. He focused on the historical origins of contemporary ethnic conflict with particular interest in Israeli-Palestinian affairs, former Yugoslavia and the Caucasus; and social constructions of masculinity.

Muller's professional career began in 2005 with the Maan News Agency in the Palestinian Territories where he worked as a reporter and editor covering events in the West Bank, East Jerusalem and the Gaza Strip including Israeli settlement construction, Israel's 2005 withdrawal from Gaza, and the 2006 Palestinian Legislative Council elections and the subsequent international boycott of the Hamas-led government.

He has since covered political and social issues in northern Uganda, Somalia, Sudan, Afghanistan, Democratic Republic of Congo and other conflict-affected areas. From 2009-2012 he was based in Juba, South Sudan covering the country's transition to independence following decades of civil war. In addition to chronicling the political issues surrounding secession, he explored the tenuous national identity of the new South. This work is born of Muller's long-standing interest in nation-states, identity and conflict in post-colonial environments. From 2012 to 2020, he was based in Nairobi, Kenya, where he covered events throughout sub-Saharan Africa, including the Ebola outbreak in West Africa in 2014–2015.

Social notions of masculinity and their impacts on male life is a consistent theme in Muller's work. For many years, this lens served as a component of his desire to understand interpersonal and collective forms of violence, much of which is committed by males. But over time, his interest broadened beyond violence and focused more on masculinity as a powerful social framework that affects nearly all aspects of how boys and men construct their lives and relationships. Today, he seeks to create work that explores the vast, complex and diverse landscape of male experiences.

In 2017, Muller was named Photographer of the Year by Pictures of the Year International (PoYI) for his extensive body of work examining boyhood experiences across the world. The acclaimed work included comparative photographic and reporting case studies from Kenya, Ukraine, El Salvador, and multiple locations in the United States and was published in a special issue of National Geographic Magazine devoted to issues of gender. The issue was a finalist for the 2017 Pulitzer Prize in the category of Explanatory Reporting.

Muller also chronicles the relationship between people and their environments. From 2017 to 2020, he undertook a global survey of the concept of solastalgia for National Geographic Magazine. This work aims to enhance social discourse on the emotional impacts of major forms of environmental degradation.

In 2011, his work on mobile military tribunals that aim to reduce mass rape in eastern Democratic Republic of Congo was included in the Open Society Foundations Moving Walls 19 Documentary Photography Exhibit. That same year he was recognized as the "Wire Photographer of the Year" by Time Magazine for his coverage of events in South Sudan, the Democratic Republic of Congo and other regions of sub-Saharan Africa. “In an intellectual sense, I hope that it [the coverage] underscores the challenges of national identity and nation-states that exists in countless countries across the world and has, for centuries, been the source of immense bloodshed,” Muller told Time Magazine.

In 2014, Muller collaborated with the Nobel Women's Initiative to chronicle and elevate the work of Congolese women activists in the country's embattled east. This collaboration culminated in an expansive exhibition at the Global Summit to End Sexual Violence in Conflict in London hosted by British Prime Minister William Hague and Angelina Jolie.

In 2017 and 2018, he served as the Cyrus Vance Visiting Professor of International Relations at Mount Holyoke College in western Massachusetts. His courses examine the subjectivity of narrative in conflict and the role of visual media as a fraught yet essential means of communication.

== Awards ==
- 2009: Nominated, 21st Annual GLAAD media award, best online journalism article category, for On the Road to Refuge, published in ColorLines Magazine, which examined the relationship between alternative sexuality and religion in the African American community. It revolved around members of the City of Refuge, an inclusive, affirming Pentecostal church in the greater Washington D.C. area.
- 2011: "Wire Photographer of the Year" by TIME Magazine for his contributions to the Associated Press from Sudan and Central Africa.
- 2011: Honorable Mention, Chinese International Press Photo Contest, War and Disaster Stories category, for his work on rape trials in Eastern Congo.
- 2012: John Faber Award for Best Photographic Reporting for a Newspaper or News Wire by the Overseas Press Club of America.
- 2013: Won the Open Society Initiative for Southern Africa's (OSISA) Open Photo Contest for "In the Shadow of Change," work documenting South Sudan's transition to independence.
- 2013: 3rd Place, Sony World Photography Awards, People category, for his work on gun enthusiasts in the United States.
- 2013: Shortlisted, Sony World Photography Awards, Contemporary Issues category for his work documenting the war and humanitarian crisis along the border of Sudan and South Sudan.
- 2015: Magnum Emergency Fund Grant to support his work on militarized anti-poaching efforts in Africa.
- 2015: 1st Prize, General News Stories category, World Press Photo Awards, World Press Photo, Amsterdam, for 'Ebola: The Viral Insurgent'.
- 2015: 1st Prize, World Health category, Pictures of the Year International, for Ebola in Sierra Leone.
- 2017: Reportage Photographer of the Year, Pictures of the Year International, for a portfolio of work focused on masculinity, including work shot while on assignment for National Geographic Magazine and Smithsonian Magazine.
- 2018: National Geographic Storytelling Fellow
- 2022: Emmy Award for Best Documentary, The First Wave, Co-Producer
