= Vlassis Caniaris =

Greek modernist painter

- Born: 1928; Athens, Greece
- Died: 2011 (aged 82–83); Athens, Greece
- Occupation: painter

Vlassis Caniaris (1928–2011) was a prominent Greek painter. He is considered one of the leading artists of Greek modernism, as it emerged from the 1960s onwards, with a strong international presence. His work falls within the framework of the so-called Generation of the Diaspora, which since the 1950s operated in European artistic centres such as Rome, Paris, and later Berlin.

== Life ==
=== Path to painting (1928–1955) ===
Vlassis Caniaris was born in Athens in 1928. Initially, he studied at the Medical School of the University of Athens. In 1950, after the death of his father, he abandoned his medical studies to pursue the visual arts. He prepared for the examinations to the Athens School of Fine Arts (ASFA) in the Panos Sarafianos Tutorial School. At the School, he had Yiannis Moralis, Umberto Argyros and Yannis Pappas for professors.

During this period, Caniaris's exposure to the new trends in Europe was limited as the teachings of the 1930s generation still prevailed. However, leafing through books and catalogs at Kauffmann's bookstore substituted for the lack of information and brought him into contact with contemporary art movements. Expanding his artistic pursuits, Caniaris participated in the IV Panhellenic Exhibition (1952) at Zappeion Megaron, alongside renowned artists of the era such as Nikos Kessanlis, Christos Caras, and Yannis Gaitis.

Simultaneously with his studies, Caniaris worked closely with Yannis Tsarouchis in stage design, creating his own stage designs and costumes for small theatrical performances. In 1953, under the supervision of Tsarouchis he created the sets for the film Stella by Michael Cacoyannis. For the needs of the film, Caniaris studied and visually documented neoclassical houses in Plaka during the post-war period when a significant number of buildings in Athens were demolished during a reckless reconstruction. Together with Tsarouchis, they meticulously studied and photographed neoclassical buildings, streets, and squares before their destruction. They then compiled an archive that documented the architectural history of the city during the period 1953 to 1955. This experience was reflected in his small-scale works depicting Athens houses, which in the following years would gain a clearer critical content.

In 1953, he married Maria Lina.

=== Rome (1956–1960) ===
In 1956, Caniaris moved with his wife to Rome, which proved to be a true revelation for Caniaris. In an atmosphere of political freedom and a ferment of artistic trends and ideas, he opened himself up to new influences from the international avant-garde, although in reality, he remained independent.

In 1959, a group called Gruppo Sigma was created by Caniaris, Yannis Gaïtis, Nikos Kessanlis, Dimitris Kontos, and Costas Tsoclis. Italian art critics viewed its work positively, recognising the originality of its artistic creation. Gruppo Sigma is regarded as a characteristic example of the Greek artistic avant-garde that emerged outside Greece during the post-war period, as well as the first attempt by Greek artists who had studied abroad to organize group exhibitions.

=== Paris (1961–1967) ===
In 1961, Caniaris moves to Paris and connects with the Nouveaux Réalistes group and Pierre Restany.

=== Athens (1967–1969) ===
In 1967, the Caniaris family returned to Greece during the military dictatorship, a decision connected to Caniaris's desire to assist in anti-dictatorship activities. In May 1969, he presented an exhibition at the "New Gallery" in Athens, a historic event. Despite the political content of the artworks, he attempted to keep a low profile so that the exhibition would not be banned by the dictatorial regime and to avoid discouraging those involved in resistance activities. In August 1969, due to his involvement in the anti-dictatorship organisation Democratic Defense and the stifling censorship regime in the country, he was forced to leave for Paris. In the consciousness of Europeans, Caniaris became more associated with "political art" in the aftermath of the events of May 1968.

=== Paris (1969–1973) ===
In 1969, he was forced to leave for Paris once again.

=== Berlin (1973–1975) ===
In the spring of 1973, Caniaris settled in West Berlin as a fellow of the DAAD (German Academic Exchange Service), amidst a climate of radical left-wing ideas in the political aftermath of May 1968. He came into contact with Greek artists residing there, such as Constantin Xenakis and Alexis Akrithakis, as well as German and foreign artists, but he remained primarily independent. He dedicated himself to the theme of Immigrants, which had become a social phenomenon with multiple implications in the 1960s and 1970s. Germany, as a host country for economic migrants in the post-war period, offered him the opportunity to closely investigate the dimensions of this phenomenon and to simultaneously expand his exploration of space, artwork within it, and the role of the viewer.

=== Athens (1975–2011) ===
In 1975, Caniaris was appointed professor in the Department of Painting at the School of Architecture of the National Technical University of Athens (NTUA), and the following year he permanently settled in Greece.

He died on March 2, 2011, in Athens.
