= Alex Mylona =

Greek artist

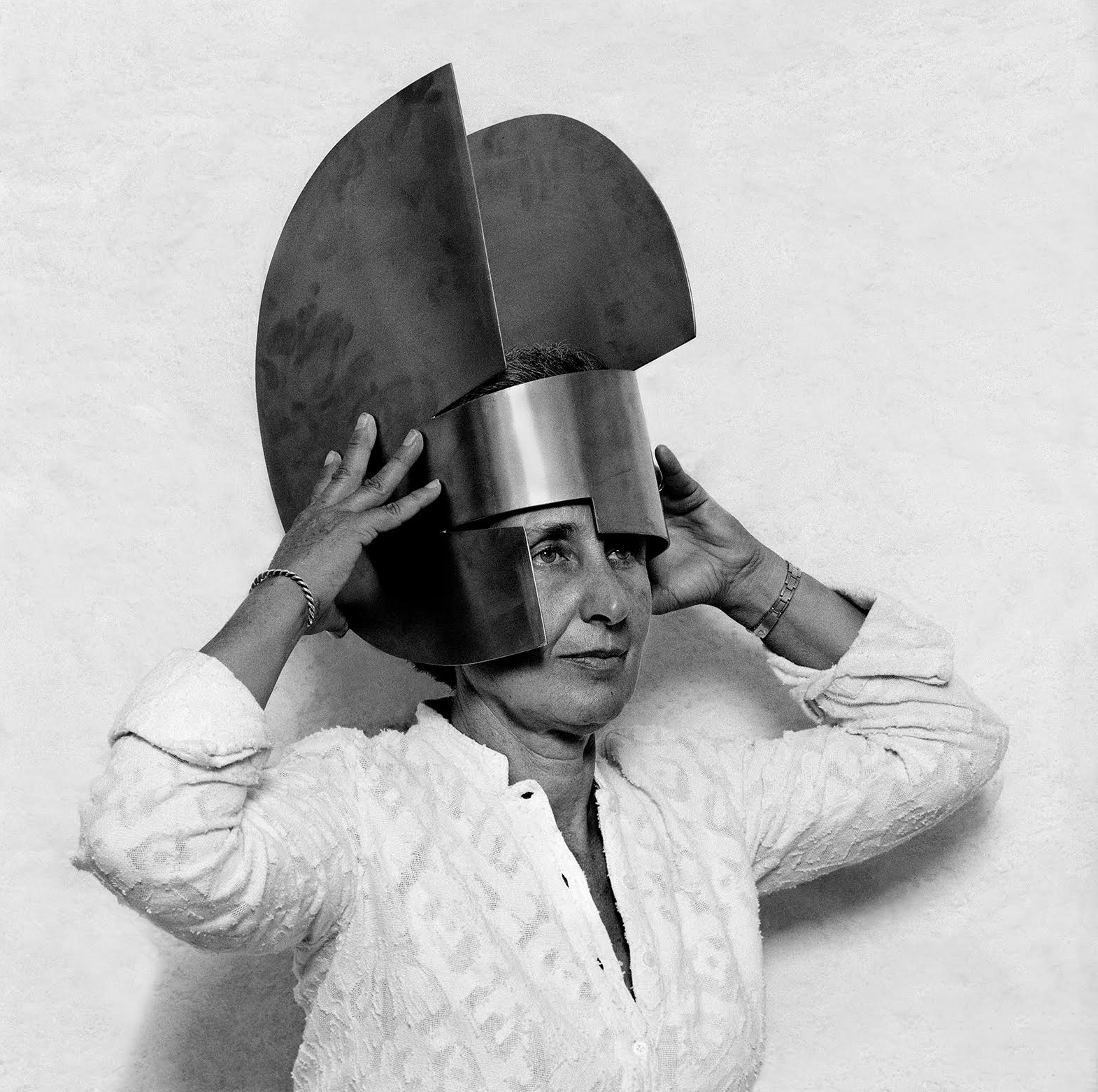
Portrait of Alex Mylona 1986 by her daughter and artist Eleni Mylonas

Alex Mylona (Athens, 1920 – 2016) was a Greek sculptor, known for her multidimensional and experimental approach to art.

From an early age, she showed a talent for drawing, starting her first painting lessons at the age of 8. She studied at the Athens School of Fine Arts, in the workshop of Michael Tombros. In 1940, she married the lawyer and politician Georgios Mylonas, with whom she had three children, Maria Mylona - Kyriakidis, the contemporary artist Eleni Mylonas and the actor Alexandros Mylonas. In the 1960s, she established a studio in the Denfert-Rochereau area in Paris, where she had the opportunity to expand her artistic horizons. Her life was affected by the political persecution of her husband during the Greek junta. Her work was strongly supported by Nikos Hatzikyriakos-Ghikas and Iris Clert and she became acquainted with Christian Zervos, Henry Moore, Alberto Giacometti, Ossip Zadkine and Jean Arp.

Mylona represented Greece at the Venice Biennale, 1960, participated at the São Paulo Art Biennial, La Biennale de Montreal, and the Paris Biennale and the Salon de la jeune sculpture in Paris. She collaborated with several galleries in Greece and abroad, notably exhibiting with Galerie Denise René in Paris. Her artistic expression included series of sculptures in marble, metal and concrete, as well as paintings, prints and other materials.

In 1986, she had a retrospective exhibition at the National Gallery-Alexandros Soutsos Museum in Athens, Greece, curated by the museum director Dimitris Papastamos. In 2002, she established the Alex Mylonas Museum, which operates under the MOMus–Museum of Contemporary Art since 2019. The museum has a permanent collection of Mylonas's work on display and hosts temporary exhibitions of contemporary art.

In the Spring of 2024 during the WOW festival, the Stavros Niarchos Foundation Cultural Center (SNFCC) hosted the open-air exhibition titled "Fulfilment" curated by the director of the National Gallery – Alexandros Soutsos Museum Syrago Tsiara. Alex Mylona's works Development of the Circle, 1986 and Berioshka 1957, part of the National Gallery collection were accompanied by six large scale photographs by artist Eleni Mylonas portraying her mother in her studio.

== Sources ==
- Μουσείο Άλεξ Μυλωνά, MoMUS
- Μυλωνά Άλεξ (1923 - 2016), Ινστιτούτο Σύγχρονης Ελληνικής Τέχνης
- Μυλωνά Άλεξ, Εθνική Πινακοθήκη
