= Sotiris Kouvelas =

Greek politician

Sotiris Kouvelas (Greek: Σωτήρης Κούβελας; born May 26, 1936, Amaliada) is a Greek politician. He is a former minister and a former mayor of Thessaloniki. In 1989, he was briefly Minister of Culture.

Political offices
Preceded by Georgios Mylonas	Minister for Culture; 1989	Succeeded by Georgios Mylonas
