= Jan Yoors =

Belgian artist and writer (1922–1977)

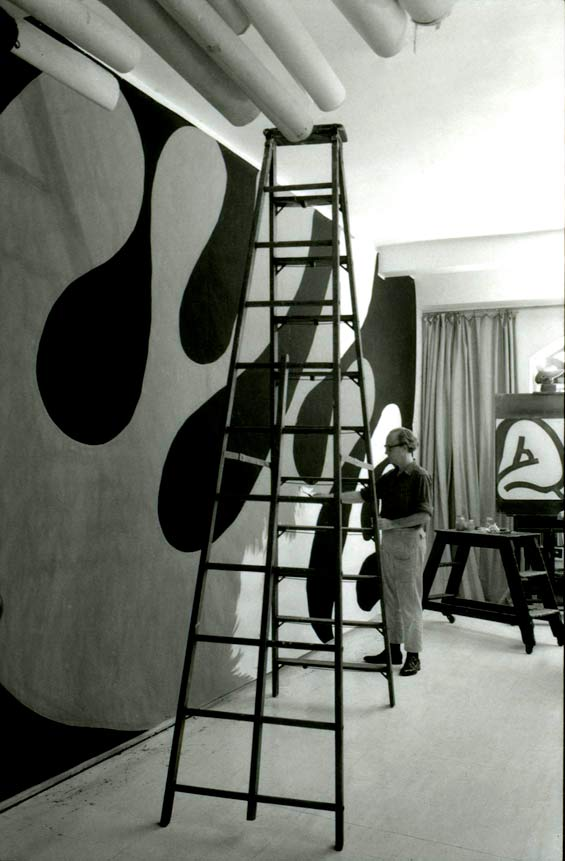
- Yoors working on Cartoon for Tapestry in JP Morgan collection
- Born: 12 April 1922; Antwerp, Belgium
- Died: 27 November 1977 (aged 55); St. Vincent's Hospital, New York City
- Resting place: Green River Cemetery
- Education: Royal Academy of Fine Arts, Antwerp
- Spouse: Annebert van Wettum (m. 1946)
- Awards: Europaprijs voor literatuur 1969; Christophe Plantin Prize; 1973

Jan Yoors (12 April 1922 – 27 November 1977) was a Belgian-American artist, photographer, painter, sculptor, writer, filmmaker, and tapestry creator. Growing up in Antwerp to liberal, pacifist parents, his father Eugeen Yoors, a famed stained-glass artist, Yoors studied painting before deciding to live with a Rom kumpania he encountered on the outskirts of Antwerp at the age of twelve, and about which he would later write two memoirs, The Gypsies (1967) and Crossing: A Journal of Survival and Resistance in World War II (1971), the latter about living with the Rom during World War II. Yoors fled to London after the war where he lived with his wife Annebert and her best friend Marianne. It is at this point that Yoors began to design tapestries and set up a tapestry studio with his wife Annebert and Marianne. In 1950 he moved to New York, traveling there under the guise of a journalist. The following year, Annebert and Marianne joined and the three set up the Jan Yoors Studio. In New York, Yoors befriended numerous figures in the art and design worlds. He received commissions from corporations such as Bank of America, and J.P. Morgan, and private collectors. His work was seen in numerous exhibitions across the United States and internationally. In New York in the 50s, Yoors also continued his passion for photography, which he began while living with the Rom, documenting the streets of New York. He traveled extensively on a trip to revisit his Rom family in Europe, and, in 1966–67 photographed post-war religious buildings for Edward Sovik as part of the First International Congress on Religion, Architecture, and the Visual Arts in New York. Yoors's oeuvre is currently represented by several galleries in New York, Europe including reGeneration Furniture, Todd Merrill, L Parker Stephenson Photographs, and Fifty One Fine Art Photography, Antwerp, and regularly shown at design and photography fairs.

== Early life and childhood ==
- 1922: Yoors is born in Antwerp to Eugeen Yoors, a famed stained glass-artist who studied painting under Gustave Moreau, and Magda Peeters, a human rights activist, both of them Catholic pacifists.
- 1934: At the age of twelve Yoors first encounters a kumpania of the Romani people on the outskirts of Antwerp. Upon becoming friends with Putzina and his father Pulika, the Romanies adopt Yoors.
- 1934–1939: Yoors splits his time between the Romanies and his parents' home, often traveling long distances to find his Rom family.
- In 1939 Pulika sets up a marriage for Yoors with a Romani girl, though Yoors decides to leave, as the conflict of dual loyalties would return.
- Yoors studies sculpture at the Royal Academy of Fine Arts, Antwerp.

== WWII ==
- On his way to the UK, Yoors is recruited by the French Resistance to co-opt the Romanies, smuggling food and arms into Belgium, France, and Holland.
- 1941–42: Yoors attends the École nationale supérieure d'architecture et des arts décoratifs (ENSAAD – La Cambre) in Brussels.
- 1943: Yoors is arrested by the Gestapo and sentenced to death. After confinement and six months of torture at La Santé Prison in Paris, he works for the allies again, impersonating an SS officer and escorting allied soldiers from behind enemy lines, however he is caught and held at the Miranda de Ebro concentration camp in Spain until 1944.
- 1944: Yoors joins Belgian forces in the UK.

== London years ==
- 1946: Yoors marries Annebert van Wettum with whom he has corresponded since age 11. The two move to London and set up a studio at 27 Holland Park Avenue W.11. Here, Yoors begins sculpting and becomes fascinated by weaving after seeing an exhibition of French medieval and Renaissance tapestries. Yoors is a frequent contributor to the Gypsy Lore Society's journal in London.

== 1945–1946 ==
- Yoors studies at the School of Oriental and African Studies (SOAS).

From: 1947–1948 Annebert's childhood friend Marianne Citroen joins them in London, also learning to weave. "Nadara" (1948), the first of the large tapestries, is completed. The Archer Gallery in London organizes the first exhibition of Yoors's work in tapestry. In 1949 the "Eighth Annual Exhibition of Catholic Art" at the Royal Institute of British Architects includes Yoors's work.

== New York ==
In 1950, Yoors travels to New York for what was meant to be a six-week stay as a journalist and sets up a studio with a 15-foot vertical loom. Galerie Stop-War in Brussels. Both tapestries and gouaches depicting biblical scenes are included.

- 1951: Marianne and Annebert join him in New York; the three live and work at 96 Fifth Avenue. Under the auspices of the Belgian Government, the International School of Art, NY, presents Yoors's first US exhibition.
- The New Yorker publishes "Gypsiana" about Yoors's travels in its 27 October issue.
- In 1953: Hugo Gallery NY presents Yoors's work.

"Tapestry Today: America's Approach to an Ancient Art", at America House is presented by the American Craftsmen's Educational Council.

- 1955: Manhattanville College of the Sacred Heart mounts an exhibition.
- 1956 Tapestries are shown at Galerias Excelsior de Reforma in Mexico City.
- The Montclair Art Museum, NJ mounts an exhibition of Yoors's tapestries.
- 1957: The Museum of Contemporary Craft exhibits Yoors's tapestries in an exhibition that travels to the Time-Life Building in 1958.
- 1957/8: Yoors receives a Pentax K1000 camera.
- 1958: The Dallas University Museum in Texas mounts "Religious Art of The Western World".
- 1959: The Yoors family moves to a studio at 329 East 47th Street.

Art in America magazine lists Yoors as a new talent. Virginia Frankl Gallery, NY organizes an exhibition of tapestries.

- 1960: Several tapestries are included "The Arts of Belgium: 1920–1960" at the Park-Bernet Galleries in New York.

The exhibition includes work by René Magritte, Gaston Bertrand, and Paul Delvaux.

- An educational film "The Revival of Tapestry from 1911" includes Yoors along with Georges Braque, Jules Chéret and Jean Lurçat, among others.
- "Liturgical Art" is mounted at the Arts Club of Chicago.
- The National Design Center in New York organizes "Architectural Tapestries"
- The apartment building "Art 333" at 333 East 79th street designed by Abraham Gellar includes the tapestry "Dancing Flames" (1960) in its inaugural exhibition.
- 1961: Yoors is invited by Belgian filmmaker Henri Storck and anthropologist and filmmaker Luc de Heusch to travel through the Balkans on a scouting trip for an unrealized documentary about the Rom.
- The Otis Art Institute in Los Angeles organizes an exhibition.
- Yoors and Dutch painter and friend Ernst Van Leyden throw a party in honor of poet Octavio Paz at the Yoors Studio.
- 1962: "Ruckus", a party featuring Dizzy Gillespie is organized at the studio to benefit CORE (Congress of Racial Equality).

A tapestry is commissioned for Shepherd of the Hills Lutheran Church in Minnesota.

- 1963: Yoors' daughter Lyuba is born on 13 September.
- 1962 and 1964: Yoors is selected as the U.S. representative at the International Biennial of Contemporary Tapestries in Lausanne.
- 1965: Yoors' son Vanya is born on 24 April.
- 1963 – 1965: Along with French filmmaker Pierre Dominique Gaisseau, Yoors participates in the making of the film Only One New York. The book, which features photographs by Yoors, is published in 1965.
- 1966 – 1967: Yoors travels throughout South America, Asia, the Middle East and Russia photographing postwar religious architecture, commissioned by the American Institute of Architects (AIA) for the 1967 "International Congress on Religion, Architecture and the Visual Arts".
- The Chicago Arts Club mounts an exhibition of tapestries.
- In 1967 The University of Texas Art Museum, Austin, organizes an exhibition of tapestries and photographs

together with Japanese-American abstract expressionist painter Kenzo Okada's recent work.

- The Gypsies is published by Simon and Schuster. Margaret Mead reviews the book in the September issue of Redbook magazine.
- Yoors travels and conducts research for an unrealized documentary on the Gypsies beginning in Northern India.

The Yoors family moves to 108 Waverly Place in Greenwich Village.

- 1968: Yoors' son Kore is born on 24 October.

1969: "Contemporary European Tapestries" from the collection of Mr. and Mrs. J.L. Hurschler is organized at the Society of the Four Arts in Florida.

- 1971: Yoors travels to Spain to photograph for his book The Gypsies of Spain. Simon and Schuster publishes Crossing: A Journal of Survival and Resistance in World War II.
- 1974: Members of his extended Rom clan came for a three-month visit.
- The Gypsies of Spain is published.
- 1975: Paule Pia, Antwerp organizes an exhibition of photographs.

Yoors returned to Belgium a final time for a retrospective in Ghent at Saint Peter's Abbey.

- 1976: Yoors's work is on view at the Sears Bank, Sears Tower, Chicago.
- Carlton Gallery, NY mounts an exhibition.
- 1977: Yoors dies of a heart attack after a long struggle with diabetes at the age of 55 on Thanksgiving Day.

== Exhibitions since Jan's death ==
- 1978: Galerij Steenhuyse in Ghent presents Yoors's tapestries.

1700 Broadway, NY mounts a memorial exhibition.

- 1979: The Clocktower Gallery, NY exhibits Yoors's tapestries.

The Metropolitan Museum of Art acquires the tapestry "Inevitable Interaction (1977)."

- 1980; The National Academy of Sciences, Washington D.C. mounts an exhibition.
- 1983: The documentary Weaving Two Worlds, features Annebert and Marianne continuing to weave Yoors's designs.

The Bryan Center at Duke University mounts a solo exhibition.

- 1986: Yoors's Rom photographs from the Balkans are on view at the Museum of Natural History, NY. The Gallery at Hastings-on-Hudson also exhibits Yoors's work.
- 1988; "Studio Survey" at Westpac Gallery in Victoria, Australia features tapestries from studio-based workshops around the world.
- 1989: The Idaho State Historical Museum in Boise, ID shows Yoors's tapestries.
- 1996: The State Academy of Art and Design, St Petersburg, Russia mounts an exhibition.
- 1998: Lizan Tops gallery in East Hampton, organizes an exhibition.
- 2000: Icon 20 gallery, NY organizes an exhibition.
- 2001:Cleveland State University, Ohio exhibits tapestries.
- 2004: Columbia University's School of International Affairs in conjunction with "The plight of the Rom" host a conference sponsored by Hillary Clinton.
- Monacelli Press publishes The Heroic Present: Life Among the Gypsies, including photographs and memoirs.
- 2005: The Bruce Museum mounts an exhibition.
- Foto Museum in Antwerp organizes a survey of Belgian photography.
- 2007: "The Heroic Present: Jan Yoors Photographs" opens at Kenneshaw, Atlanta; Kansas State University, and Asheville, North Carolina.
- 2009: Fifty-One Fine Art, Antwerp shows Yoors's work at "Paris Photo".
- L. Parker Stephenson Photographs, NY shows Yoors's work in "La France de Profil".
- 2010: L. Parker Stephenson Photographs presents "Jan Yoors: Harlem, c. 1963".
- "Mid Century Style and Studio Pottery" at Greenwich House Pottery NY includes Jungle (1977).
- ReGeneration Furniture organizes "Tapestries, Drawings, and Photographs from the Estate of Jan Yoors". The gallery will organize two additional exhibitions.
- "Wandering the World City: Jan Yoors' New York Photographs, 1960s" is presented at Columbia University.

2011–2012

- Stormy Sky (1976) is hung at the 2011 "Armory Show" at the ReGeneration Furniture lounge.
- The Museum of Arts and Design, NY presents "Crafting Modernism".
- "Couleurs shock", a solo-exhibition of tapestries is presented by Galerie Chevalier, Paris.
- Fifty-One Fine Art, Antwerp includes Yoors's photographs at "Paris Photo".
- L. Parker Stephenson, New York Gallery presents Yoor's photographs at "AIPAD Photography Show".
- Fifty-One Fine Art photography, Antwerp exhibits Yoors's photographs.
- FeliXart Museum in Drogenbos-Brussels organizes the first retrospective of Yoors's work since his death
- L. Parker Stephenson, New York, organizes "Jan Yoors: Abstractions 1960s −1977 Photographs, Gouaches, and Drawings" on view 4 September – 1 November 2014.

2013-2015

- Art Brussels; represented by 51 Fine Art Photography, Brussels, Belgium.
- Suddenness + Certainty; Robert Miller Gallery, New York, NY.
- Life Among the Gypsies: The Pre-War Photographs of Jan Yoors – 1930-40; Anne Frank Center, New York, NY.
- The Heroic Present: The Gypsy Photographs of Jan Yoors; Kennesaw State University Center.
- What Would Mrs. Webb Do? A Founders Vision. Museum of Arts & Design. New York, NY.
- Jan Yoors: Abstractions 1960’s-1977; Photographs, Gouaches and Drawings; L. Parker Stephenson Photographs
- AIPAD Photography Fair; represented by 51 Fine Art Photography, New York
- Art Brussels; represented by 51 Fine Art Photography
- Jan Yoors Charcoal Drawings. 51 Fine Art Photography. Antwerp
- I, Gypsy: The Voyages of Jan Yoors. The Red Starline Museum. Antwerp, Belgium
- Jan Yoors, A Retrospective. Artis-Naples, The Baker Museum. Naples, Florida.
- Paris Photo. Represented by 51 Fine Art Photography. Paris, France

2016-2020

- Their Own Harlems. Studio Museum in Harlem. New York, NY.
- Machines for Living: Flamenco and Architecture in the Occupation and Eviction of Spaces. CentroCentro Cibeles en Cultura y Ciudadania. Madrid, Spain.
- Jan Yoors – Tantra Series, 1975-1977: Photographs, Gouaches and Tapestries. L. Parker Stephenson Gallery. New York. NY.
- Machines for Living: Flamenco and Architecture in the Occupation and Eviction of Spaces. La Virreina Centre de la Imatge. Barcelona, Spain.
- Photographic Traces of the Romany Worlds. Musee de i’histoire de L’Immirgation. Paris, France.

2021-Present

- Drawing Now. Gallery-Fifty One. Antwerp, Belgium
- Children of the Streets: Reminiscences of Jan Yoors. Tulane University. Online Exhibition.
- 100/Centennial. Gallery Fifty-One. Antwerp, Belgium
- Kairos. Schonfeld Gallery. Brussels, Belgium
- Street Chronicles. Gallery Fifty One. Antwerp, Belgium

== Awards ==
- 1969 – Europaprijs voor literatuur
- 1973 – Christophe Plantin Prize
