= Gruppo Sigma =

Gruppo Sigma (Greek: Ομάδα Σίγμα) was a short-lived group of young Greek artists founded in 1958 in Italy. It is a prime example of the Greek artistic avant-garde that flourished outside Greece during the postwar period and the first attempt by Greek artists who had been educated abroad to present joint exhibitions.

== History ==
Gruppo Sigma was founded in 1958 in Rome by the Greek painters Vlassis Caniaris, Yannis Gaïtis, Nikos Kessanlis, Mimis Kontos and Costas Tsoclis. The members of the group were young and avant-garde artists living abroad, all in Rome with the exception of Gaïtis, who lived in Paris, and were knowledgeable of the contemporary art movements of their time.

The group aimed to highlight the Greek presence and identity in the international art world and to foster artistic and exhibition-related cooperation among its members. As a group, it was short-lived and held only two exhibitions, in 1959 in Naples and Bologna; nevertheless, it managed to leave its mark, earning positive reviews in Greece and Italy. Moreover Gruppo Sigma was the first attempt by Greek artists who had studied abroad to organize joint exhibitions.

== Bibliography ==
- Bolis, Yannis; Misirloglou, Thouli. Untitled II Greek Postwar Abstraction: the heroic years (PDF). ΜΟΜus.
- Lambraki–Plaka, Marina, ed. (1999). Εθνική Πινακοθήκη 100 χρόνια: Τέσσερις αιώνες Ελληνικής Ζωγραφικής (in Greek). Athens: National Gallery of Greece.
