= Last Supper (Warhol) =

Series of paintings by Andy Warhol

- Artist: Andy Warhol
- Year: 1986
- Medium: Acrylic and silkscreen ink on canvas
- Movement: Pop Art

Last Supper is a series of silkscreen paintings and prints created by the American artist Andy Warhol in 1986. The works are based on The Last Supper mural by Leonardo da Vinci. Widely regarded as Warhol's final major body of work—and possibly his largest—the series has also been described as the most extensive group of religious artworks produced by any American artist.

== Background ==
Pop artist Andy Warhol was raised a Byzantine Catholic and remained a devout Catholic throughout his life. Conceived as a commission from the gallerist Alexander Iolas in 1985, the Last Supper series reinterpreted Leonardo da Vinci's The Last Supper (Il Cenacolo) through Warhol's characteristic strategies of appropriation, seriality, and repetition. Iolas paid Warhol $150,000 for a monumental Last Supper painting along with six smaller works, although Warhol ultimately expanded the project into a vast body of more than 100 silkscreen paintings and prints. Art historian Jane Dillenberger described the series as "the largest series of religious art by any American artist."

The series was first presented by Iolas in Milan in 1987. In addition to the commissioned paintings, Warhol lent 15 related works—including 12 drawings of Christ and three additional Last Supper paintings—for the exhibition. It was initially shown at the bank Credito Valtellinese before being installed at the former refectory of the Palazzo delle Stelline, opposite Santa Maria delle Grazie, which houses Leonardo's mural.

== Description ==
These works belong to a distinct group of fewer than 25 known silkscreen paintings derived from a black-and-white printed reproduction of The Last Supper, which Warhol cropped, stacked, overlaid, and rotated in his reinterpretations. Some of the iterations were on a 40-by-40-inch scale, presenting the image doubled and stacked in vivid colorways such as yellow, pink, green, blue, and camouflage.

== Interpretation ==
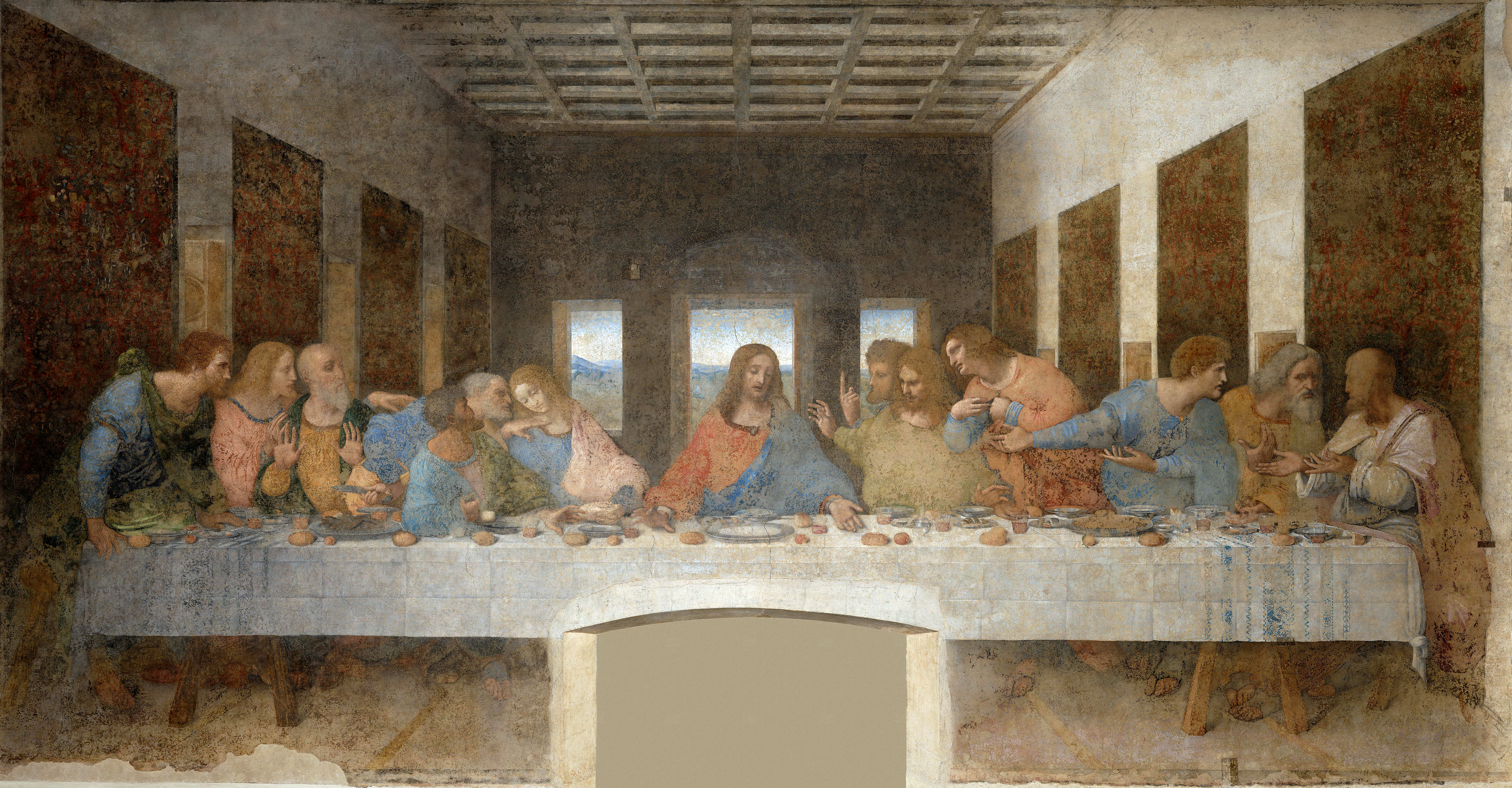
Leonardo da Vinci's The Last Supper (1495–1498)

Art historian Jane D. Dillenberger recounted how her research for her book The Religious Art of Andy Warhol (1999) began after she was "transfixed" by a photograph of Andy Warhol's studio showing a work based on Leonardo da Vinci's Last Supper. The image prompted Dillenberger to locate more work by Warhol inspired by the subject. While Warhol also produced works drawing on other religious imagery and texts, Dillenberger argues that it was in the Last Supper series that his "concealed religiosity" most fully emerged in his art. She cites curator Lynne Cooke's view that it was arguably Warhol's "greatest series."

In 2017, art historian Jessica Beck, former curator at the Andy Warhol Museum, proposed that the series can be interpreted as Warhol's artistic response to the AIDS crisis. The paintings are discussed in "Loving the Alien", the sixth and final episode of the 2022 Netflix docuseries The Andy Warhol Diaries.

== Exhibitions ==
Warhol shipped works from this series to Italy on Christmas Eve of 1986, and they were shown at the bank Credito Valtellinese in Milan. In his diary, Warhol recalled on January 21, 1987: "lolas was just presenting me at the bank Credito-Valtellinese. 'Alexander lolas Presents Andy Warhol.' He must've gotten all this money to 'present' us. My Last Supper show was closing down that day and my other show was opening, so there was lots of publicity."

The series was then presented in the exhibition Andy Warhol – Il Cenacolo at the Palazzo delle Stelline in Milan from January to March 1987. Warhol attended the opening, one of the last exhibitions of his lifetime. It coincided with his exhibition of the Statue of Liberty series at Galerie de Bellecour–Jean-Marc Michali in Lyon. Warhol died in February 1987, shortly before the Milan exhibition closed, and Iolas died four months later in June 1987. In 1988, ownership of the loaned works for the show became the subject of litigation between their estates after a proposed exchange of the paintings for antiquities from Iolas's collection was never completed before their deaths.

From June 1999 to July 2001, the Guggenheim Museum SoHo in New York hosted the significant, long-running exhibition Andy Warhol: The Last Supper.

In 2017, the Museo del Novecento in Milan held an exhibition of the works in honor of the thirtieth anniversary of their Milanese debut.

The Last Supper series was featured in the exhibition Andy Warhol: Revelation at the Brooklyn Museum in New York from November 2021 to June 2022. The exhibition examined Warhol's Catholic faith through a range of his works.

== Critical reception ==
The Last Supper series received a mixed but substantial critical response. In 1987, writing in Artforum, critic Jole De Sanna described it as Warhol's "most complex work that he produced in the years after his celebrated silkscreen prints of famous personalities."

In 1999, Claudia Schmuckli, a curatorial assistant at the Guggenheim wrote "the extent of the series indicates an almost obsessive investment in the subject matter, which takes on an added significance in light of the revelation of the secret religious life." By contrast, art critic Anthony Haden-Guest wrote for Artnet that "Warhol's Christ seems wishy-washy, religiose—an icon nobody quite knows," questioning the role of Warhol's Catholic faith in the series and suggesting that his beliefs may have "damped down the energy" and removed "the dry sulfurous crackle of the best work," leaving the paintings "paradoxically… spiritless."

== Collections ==
The large painting Camouflage Last Supper (1986), measuring more than 25 feet in length and overlaid with a military-style camouflage pattern is now held in the collection of the Menil Collection in Houston.

The collaborative sculpture Ten Punching Bags (Last Supper) (1985) with Jean-Michel Basquiat, was never shown during Warhol's lifetime. It is in the collection of the Andy Warhol Museum in Pittsburgh.

== Art market ==
In May 2008, art dealer Jose Mugrabi purchased Detail of the Last Supper (Christ 112 Times) (1986) for $9.5 million at Christie's in New York. Measuring 6 by 35 feet, it features a black grid with Christ's face outlines in yellow.

In May 2017, Last Supper (1986) a double image in pink and black, sold for $18.7 million at Christie's in New York.

In November 2017, Sixty Last Suppers (1986) sold for $60.9 million at Christie's in New York.

In May 2018, Last Supper (1986), a double image in yellow and black, sold for $8.7 million at Phillips in New York.

In May 2025, The Last Supper (1986), a double image in blue and black, sold for $7.07 million at Christie's in New York. That month, The Last Supper screenprint fetched $453,600 at Christie's.

In November 2025, The Last Supper (1986), a double image in yellow and black from the Edlis | Neeson Collection, achieved $8.1 million at Christie's in New York.
