= Costas Tsoclis =

Greek artist (born 1930)

Costas Tsoclis (Greek: Κώστας Τσόκλης; Athens,1930) is a Greek visual artist associated with post-war and contemporary Greek art. His work includes painting, constructions, installations and multimedia.

== Biography ==
Tsoclis was born in Athens into a large family with little income. Raised during the time of the Second World War, the Axis occupation of Greece and the Civil War that followed, he worked during his teen years as an assistant of head scenic artists in various Athenian cinemas.

He entered the Athens School of Fine Arts in 1948, studying painting under Yannis Moralis and graduated in 1954. In 1957 he earned a state scholarship in order to continue his studies in Rome. In Italy, he formed in 1958 Gruppo Sigma with fellow Greek visual artists Vlassis Caniaris, Yannis Gaïtis, Nikos Kessanlis and Mimis Kontos. Gruppo Sigma is regarded as a characteristic example of the Greek artistic avant-garde that emerged outside Greece during the post-war period, as well as the first attempt by Greek artists who had studied abroad to organize collective exhibitions.

Meanwhile in 1957, Tsoclis married Fania Kaplanidou with whom he has a daughter, journalist Maya Tsoclis. The couple lived together until Kaplanidou's death in 1968. For many years Tsoclis and his family lived between Rome and Paris. During this period, Tsoclis collaborated with art dealer Ileana Sonnabend and started exhibiting his art in Belgium, Italy and West Germany. In 1971–1972 he lived temporarily in Berlin under a DAAD scholarship. Following his return to Paris, Tscolis started his collaboration with Greek-American art gallerist Alexander Iolas. Despite living abroad, Tsoclis continued to display his work in multiple group and solo exhibitions in Greece.

In 1973, Tsoclis' daughter and his second wife, Eleni, returned to Greece while he lived for about 12 years between Paris and Athens, with his artistic presence in Greece gradually increased. In 2001 the National Museum of Contemporary Art in Athens organized a retrospective exhibition of his work, presenting 86 paintings, constructions, installations and video-projection. In 2011, he founded Costas Tsoclis Museum on the island of Tinos.

Tsoclis' work has been widely exhibited in solo and group exhibitions in Greece and abroad. In 1986, he represented Greece at the Venice Biennale with Christos Caras. There, he presented his works Portraits (five color video projections on paintings with acrylic on fabric) and the Harpooned Fish (a living-painting work), among others.

Some of his works occupy public spaces, including Tribute to Alexandros Iolas in the courtyard of the Archaeological Museum of Thessaloniki, Underground Park in Ethniki Amyna metro station in Athens,, Genesi in Pistoia etc.
