= Eugeen Yoors =

Eugeen Yoors (formerly Joors, 1879–1975) was a Flemish painter, draughtsman, engraver, and stained-glass artist.

== Life ==
Born as Eugène Joors on 7 November 1879 in Antwerp, Yoors spent his formative years in Seville, Spain, where his father held the position of liquor factory manager. He was educated in Spanish and French and undertook studies at the Academy of Fine Arts in Seville. He subsequently returned to Antwerp in 1899 to pursue his studies at the National Higher Institute for Fine Arts Antwerp (Nationaal Hoger Instituut voor Schone Kunsten).

From 1905, he pursued further studies at the École nationale supérieure des beaux-arts in Paris for a number of years. During his time in Paris, he became acquainted with the novelist Joris-Karl Huysmans, Jacques Brasilier, Joséphin Péladan, the founder of a Catholic Rosicrucian movement and Léon Bloy, also follower Péladan teachings. Additionally, he undertook further travel to England, Germany, Switzerland, and the Netherlands. In 1907, he established his permanent residence in Boechout, Antwerp.

In 1905, he encountered the emerging architect and artist Flor Van Reeth. Both subsequently became founding members of the Boechout art circle, Streven. At one of the aforementioned exhibitions, Huysmans and Van Reeth encountered the author Felix Timmermans. They held similar perspectives on art, religion, and mysticism and established a lifelong friendship. In 1908, Yoors and Van Reeth co-founded the Belgian branch of the spiritual society of the Rosicrucians, the Rosicrucian brotherhood La Rosace and joined the Antwerp art circle De Scalden. He designed his first stained-glass window for the Jozef Muls' villa in Kapellen in 1911. In 1913, Yoors and Van Reeth established the art school Le Scarabée d'Or, which focused on the production of objects related to the building and decorative arts.

Following the German invasion of Belgium in 1914, Yoors was forced to remain in the Netherlands as a military refugee. During this period, he created over 500 drawings of soldiers, which he produced in the internment camp of Amersfoort and was later transferred to the internment camp of Zeist. EIn 1918, he married the artist Magda Peeters (1892–1989). In order to provide for his young family, he subsequently focused his efforts on the production of stained glass windows. In 1924, he altered his original surname, Joors, to Yoors, in order to avoid confusion with an older fellow artist Eugène Joors.

In 1925, Yoors joined with Flor Van Reeth, Felix Timmermans, Ernest Van der Hallen, Anton Van de Velde, and Gerard Walschap, among others, to establish the core group of the progressive Catholic artists' association De Pelgrim. This society of artists professed the Christian faith in works of art, literature, and music that were artistically responsible and in accordance with their religious beliefs took a stand for the renewal of Christian art. The manifesto of this movement attracted international attention.

== Works ==
Yoor's reputation was primarily based on his pioneering approach to stained-glazing, which he developed in Belgium. His contributions to stained glass windows are recognized in Belgium, England, Mexico, and the Democratic Republic of the Congo. Notable examples include the stained glass windows in the chapel of St. Laurentius Church in Antwerp. In collaboration with architect Flor Van Reeth, he designed the stained glass windows for the chapel of the Sacred Heart Institute of the Sisters of the Annunciation in Heverlee (450 m^{2} of stained glass windows), the chapel of St. Aloysius College in Ninove, St. Walburgis Church, St. Lievens College, Christus-Koning Church, the St. Ludgardis School in Antwerp, several churches in Weelde and the Cistercian abbey of Notre-Dame of Clairfontaine in Bouillon and the Mater Dei church in Lubumbashi.

In the period between 1959 and 1965, he produced ten stained glass windows for the Yser Towers, which was undergoing reconstruction, based on Joe English drawings.

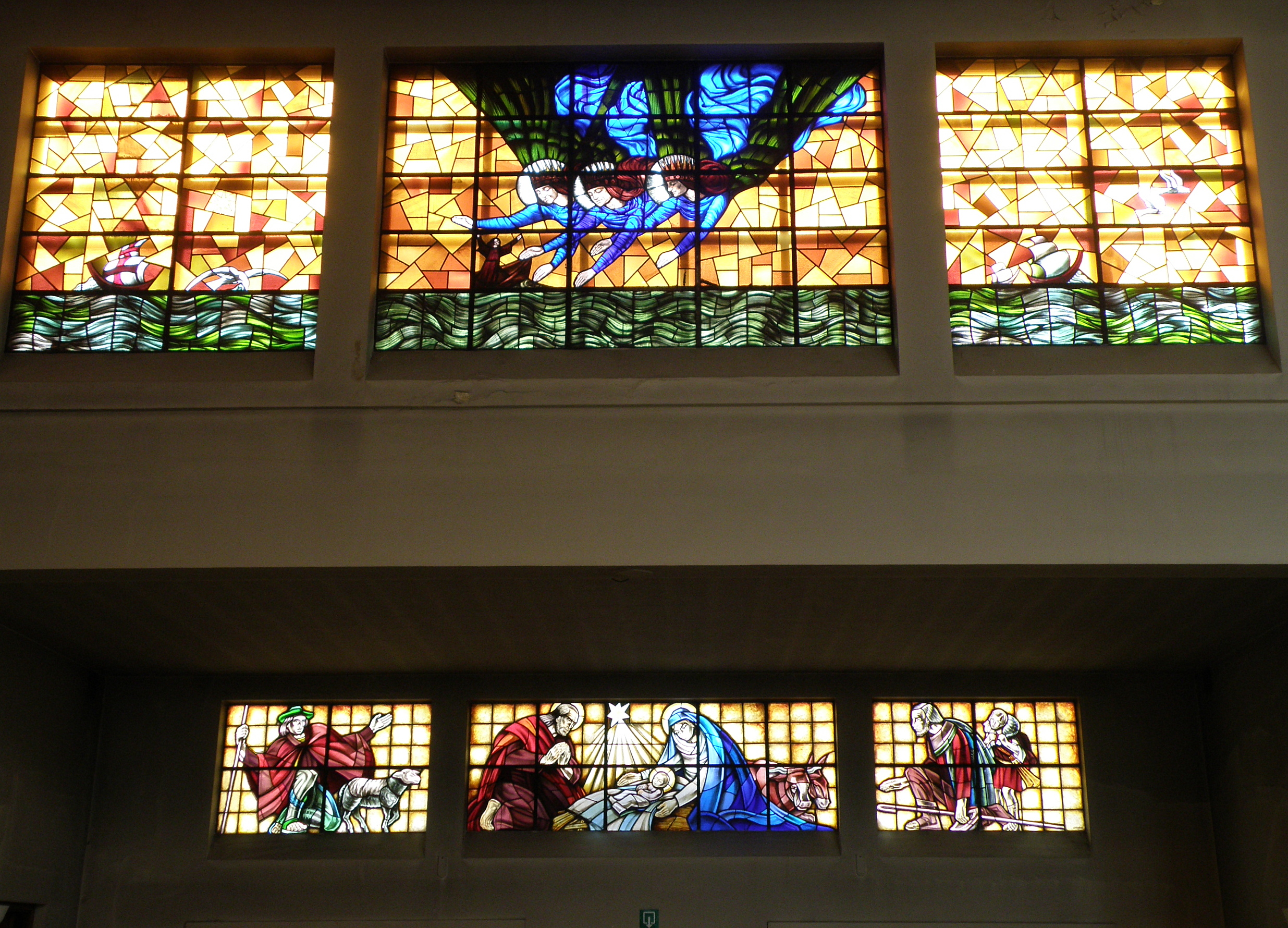
Sint-Walburgiskerk in Antwerp

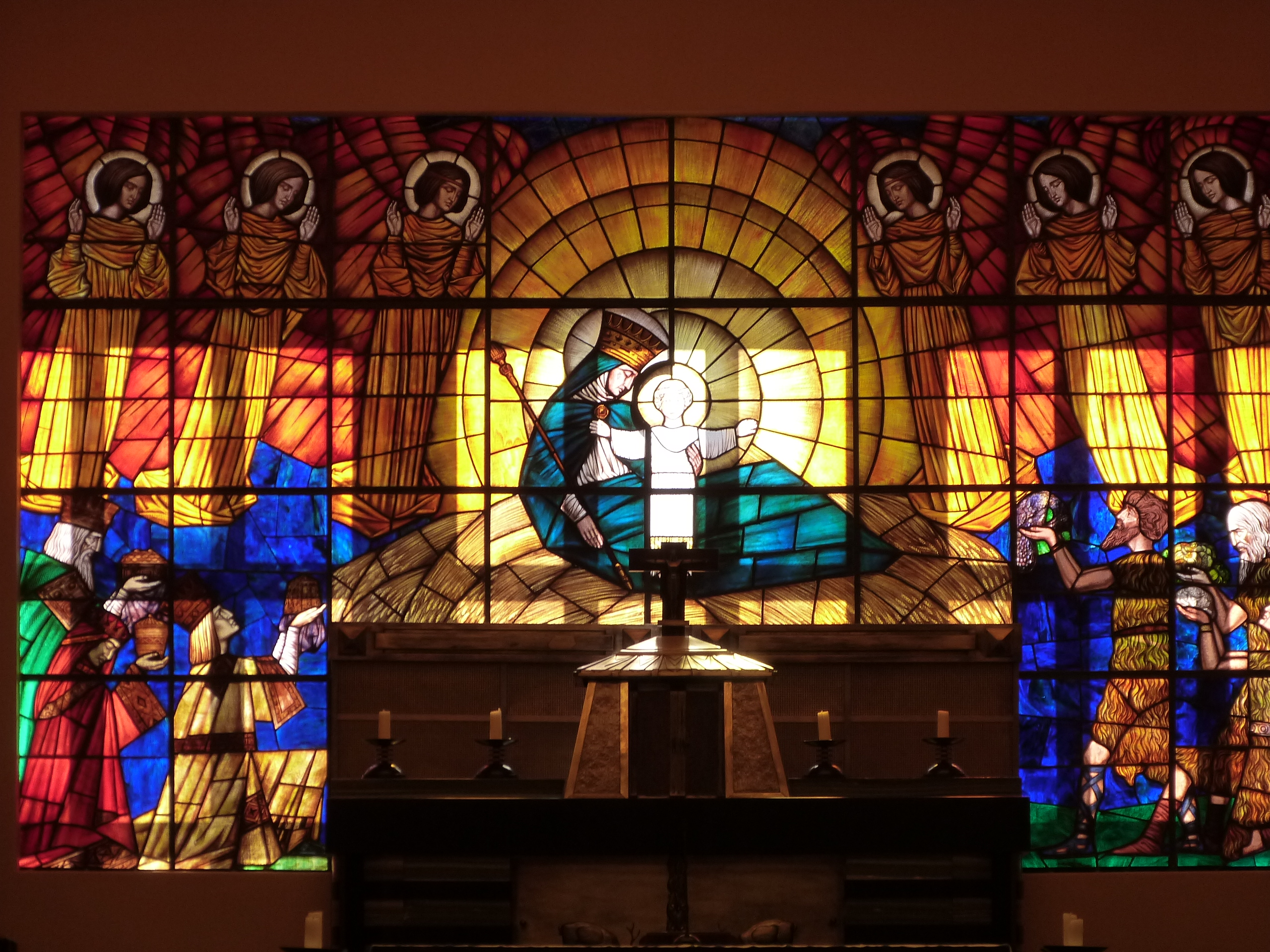
Onze-Lieve-Vrouw Boodschap, Heverlee

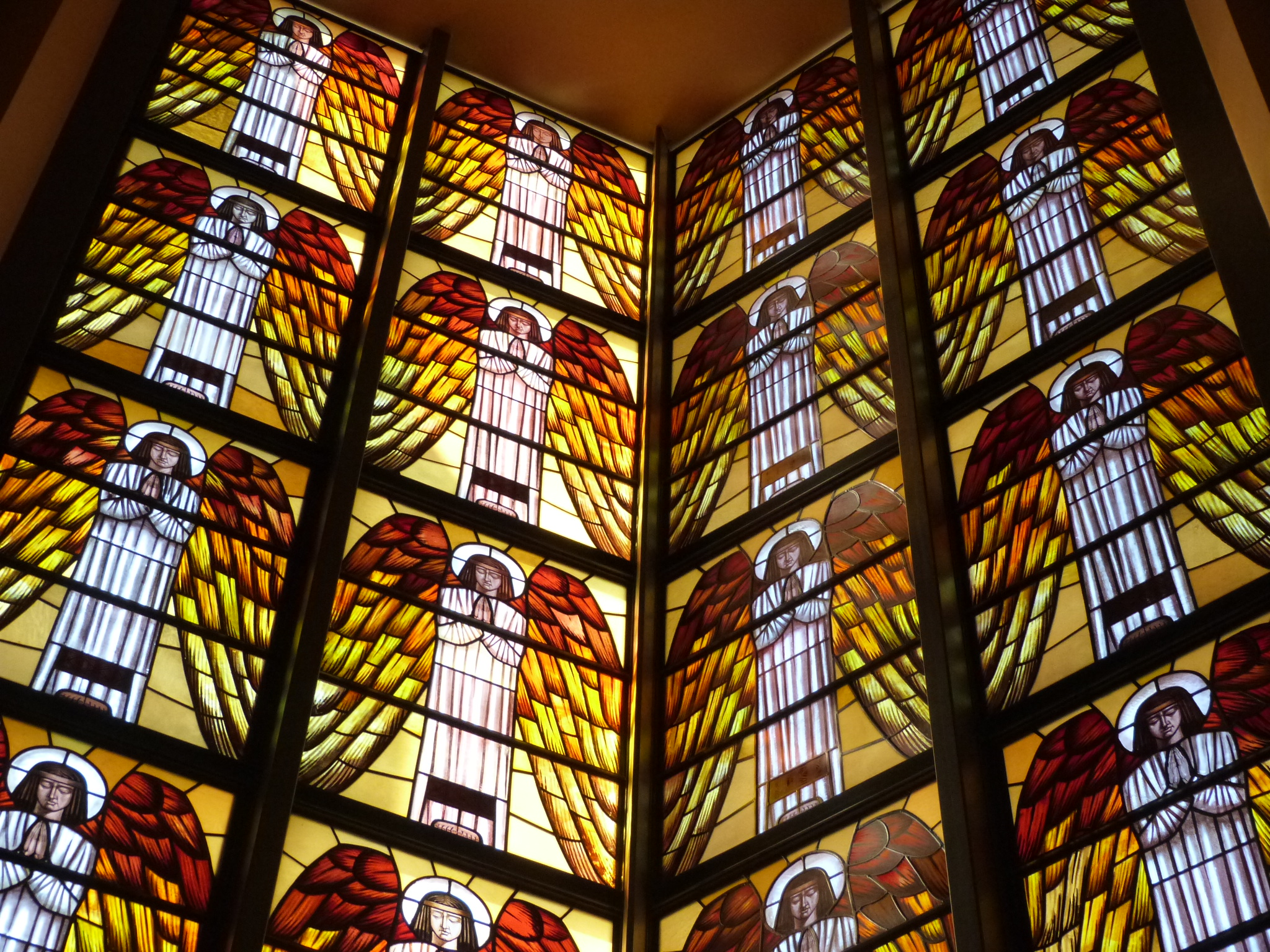
Onze-Lieve-Vrouw Boodschap, Heverlee

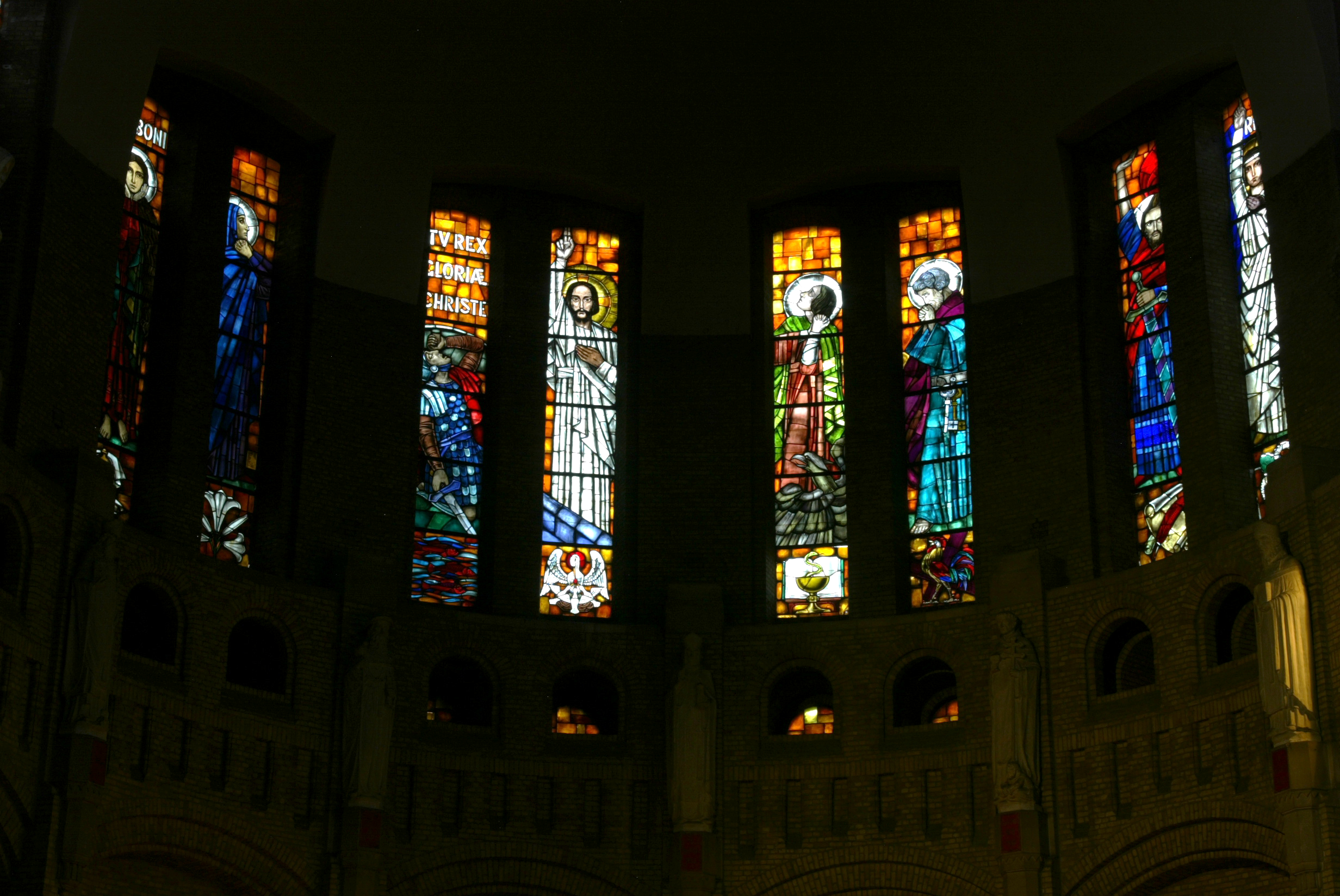
Christus Koningkerk in Antwerp

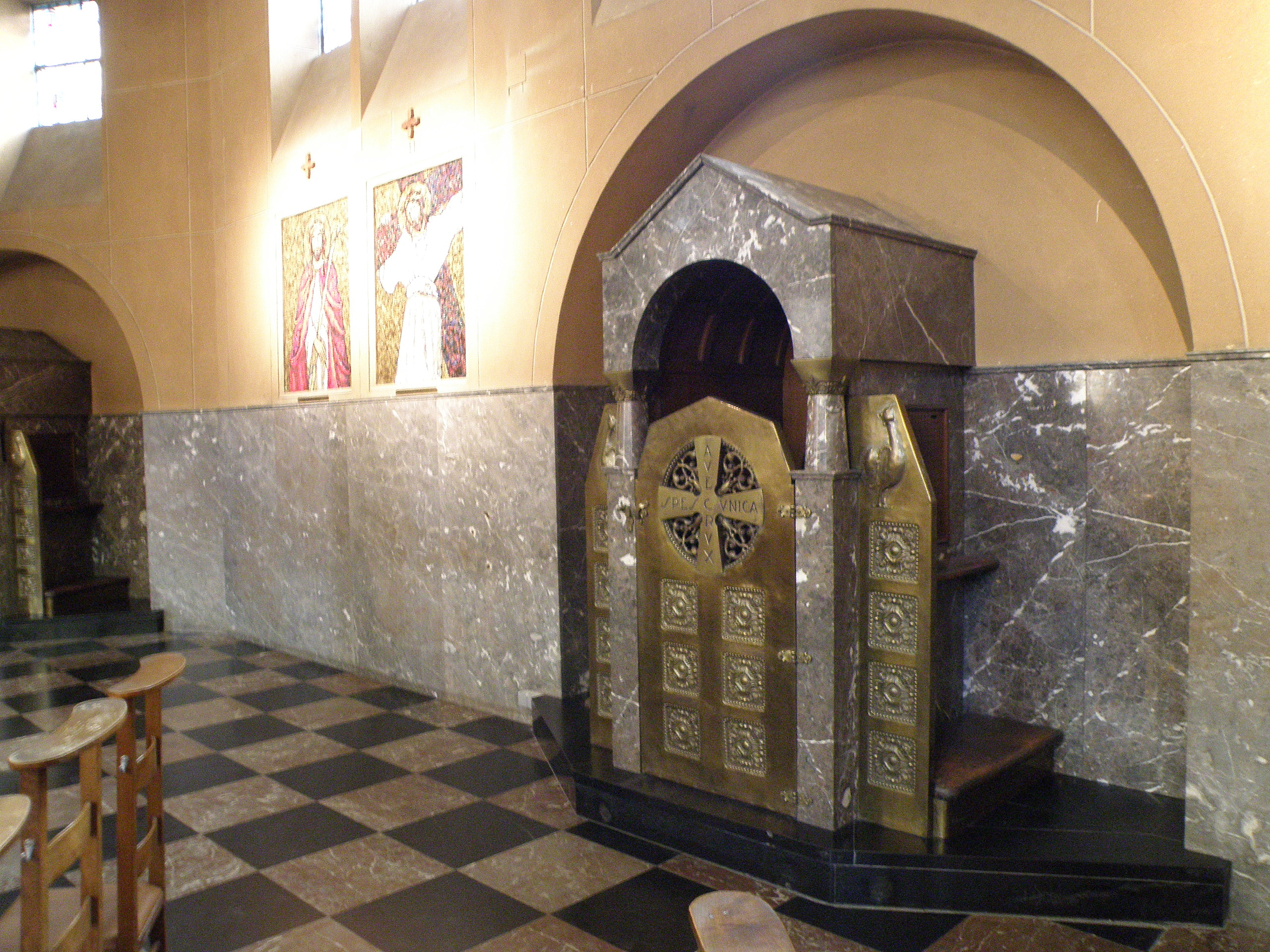
Stations of the Cross mosaic, Sint-Laurentiuskerk, Antwerp

In England, Yoors was awarded in 1946 the title of Fellow of the Royal Society on the occasion of the unveiling of the large stained glass window in Kingsley Hall, London, in memory of George Lansbury. In 1947 he created the 'Memorial Window' in memory of Lieutenant de Mey in the Jesuit Priory at Windsor. On 4 March 1967 he was made a Knight of the Order of St Sylvester.

In his final years, Yoors created a multitude of designs in gouache on cardboard for the Cathedral of World Peace, a project initiated by Flor Van Reeth that was ultimately unfinished.

Eugeen Yoors died on 1 April 1975 In Berchem and was buried in Schoonselhof cemetery. He was the father of New York-based sculptor, painter, and tapestry maker Jan Yoors.
