= Spyropoulos =

Spyropoulos or Spiropoulos Greek: Σπυρόπουλος is a Greek surname. It may refer to:

- Andrea Spyropoulos, British nurse
- Dimitris Spyropoulos, member of the Greek punk rock band Deus Ex Machina
- Farida Mazar Spyropoulos, birth name of Farida or Little Egypt, a Syrian belly dancer
- Georgia Spiropoulos (born 1965), Greek composer
- Jean Spiropoulos (1896–1972), Greek expert of international law
- Kostas Spiropoulos (born 1952), Greek painter and University Professor
- Nikos Spyropoulos (born 1983), Greek footballer
- Panagiotis Spyropoulos (born 1992), Greek footballer
- Theodore Spyropoulos, Greek archeologist
- Yiannis Spyropoulos (1912–1990), Greek painter
