= Eleni Mylonas =

Greek-born American artist

- Ελένη Μυλωνά
- Born: 14 September 1944 (age 81); Athens, Greece
- Education: University of Geneva; Columbia University Graduate School of Journalism; University of Westminster; New York Studio School
- Known for: photography performance multimedia

Eleni Mylonas (Greek: Ελένη Μυλωνά; born 14 September 1944) is a Greek-born American artist.

== Early life and education ==
Eleni Mylonas was born on 14 September 1944 in Athens to father politician Georgios Mylonas, who's served as minister of Culture and Education, and mother Alex Mylona, sculptor and co-founder of the MOMus Museum Alex Mylona in Athens. She received a BA from the University of Geneva in 1966 and an MA from the Columbia University Graduate School of Journalism in 1967 as a Fulbright scholar. She graduated in photography at the University of Westminster in 1972 and in painting and sculpture at the New York Studio School in 1995.

== Work ==
Mylonas is a multidisciplinary artist with works in traditional media, video art, and performance.

Her first exhibition was Nude Landscapes at the Zoumboulaki Gallery of Athens, in 1982.

Her work has been featured in solo exhibitions at the MoMA PS1 in New York City; Benaki Museum in Athens; Francoise Heitsch Gallery in Munich; Ileana Tounta Contemporary Art Center in Athens; Zoumboulaki Gallery in Athens; Foundation of Hellenic Culture in New York City and Art Resources Transfer. Her work has been shown at various museums and galleries including, the Queens Museum in New York City; MOMus Museum in Thessaloniki; EMST Museum in Athens; Cooper Union in New York; Museum of Contemporary Art of Crete; and the Alternative Museum in New York City. She has collaborated with international curators including Joanna de Vos, Beral Madra, Christian Oxenius, Edward Leffingwell and Sozita Goudouna. Three bodies of work from her photographic archive, Ellis Island, NY Graffiti/Street Art and Portraits of Artists & Personalities, are part of the MoMA Archives.

== Reviews ==
On the occasion of the New York exhibition of Mylonas's series of photographs of the abandoned Ellis Island, American art critic April Kingsley wrote the images make "rubble-covered rags look like the draperies on the Nike of Samothrace." She added that the artist's "eye finds the formal beauty of ancient Greece at its most glorious in the least of the modern world's visual material--graffiti, the rubble of abandoned buildings and empty lots, and, recently wrecked automobiles."

Critic Evely Vogel of the Süddeutsche Zeitung remarked that her 2014 exhibition "Town Crier" was "inspired by the demonstrators of the Arab spring" and "full of revolutionary urge and humor." The artist's "allegorical call," she concluded, "to "fight against tyranny is just too timeless." During the first Athens Biennial, from 10 September until 18 November 2007, named "Destroy Athens" with the intention to "lay waste to the association of Greece with classical culture," her video piece Lamb of God that closed the show had been reportedly "captured on the first day of the U.S. invasion of Iraq." According to ArtNet's Brian Skar, the "spare" clip "hammer[ed] together in a single point, myth, the abject, and the groping for larger social significance that characterizes [the whole Biennial]."

== Personal life ==
In 1967, she married writer Elias Kulukundis, who subsequently became involved in springing outside the country her father who, at the time, was imprisoned and exiled in the Aegean island of Amorgos by the regime. They divorced in the late 1970s.

== See also ==
- Chryssa

== Publications ==
- 1984: Ralph Lauren, Bo Niles. White Designs. Published by Stewart, Tabori & Chang. ISBN 0-941434-54-0
- 1985: Edward Booth-Clibborn. American Photography One Published by Polygon Editions S.A.R.L. ISBN 0-8109-1830-7
- 1985: Edward Booth-Clibborn. American Photography 6 Published by Rizzoli International Publications. ISBN 0-8478-5570-8
- 1985: Ivan Chermayeff, Fred Wasserman, Mary J. Shapiro. Ellis Island/An Illustrated History of the Immigrant Experience. Macmillan Publishers ISBN 0-02-584441-5
- 1992: Judith Smith, Celebrating Immigration History at Ellis Island. The Johns Hopkins University Press.
- 1997: Barbara Rose, Chryssa Cycladic Books 1957-1962.Goulandris Museum of Cycladic Art. ISBN 960-7064-20-8
- 1999: Peter Selz, William Valerio, Modern Odysseys: Greek American Artists of the 20th Century. Queens Museum of Art. ISBN 1-929641-00-1

== Collections ==
- National Museum of Contemporary Art in Athens
- Athens College
- American College of Greece
- Goulandris Museum of Natural History
- Ellis Island Museum
- G&A Mamidakis Foundation
- FKP Collection
