= Hugo Gallery =

Art gallery in New York

The Hugo Gallery was a New York City gallery, founded by Robert Rothschild, Elizabeth Arden and Maria dei Principi Ruspoli Hugo between 1945 and 1955 and operated by Alexander Iolas. The Hugo gallery was initially on East 55th Street and Madison Avenue.

On opening day, November 15th, 1945, a party was held at the gallery. This party was documented by journalist Edward Alden Jewell, who reported on the works of art on display from "first-rate" paintings to decorations from many florists in the area. Many in the dance world turned out, with high-profile guests, such as Pavel Tchelitchew and Tamara Toumanova, in attendance.

== Exhibitions ==
The gallery’s inaugural exhibition in November 1945, entitled “The Fantastic in Modern Art”, was organized by Charles Henri Ford and Parker Tyler, the editors of Surrealist magazine View.

The Christmas show of 1945 called “The Poetic Theatre” included among others Salvador Dalí, Pavel Tchelitchew and Joseph Cornell. In December 1946, Joseph Cornell had a solo exhibitions at the Hugo Gallery named "Romantic Museum at the Hugo Gallery: Portraits of Women by Joseph Cornell". For this exhibition Cornell conceived one of his most ambitious works, the untitled piece known as "Penny Arcade Portrait of Lauren Bacall".

In 1947 the gallery hosted "Bloodflames 1947", a show organized by Nicolas Calas and designed by Frederick Kiesler which was the last collective manifestation of the surrealist exiles' group in New York. The exhibition included work by David Hare, Arshile Gorky, Roberto Matta and Isamu Noguchi.

In April 1947, René Magritte had an exhibition at the Hugo Gallery in New York. Magritte achieves international recognition, in large part, to Hugo Gallery.

In 1952, Andy Warhol had his first solo exhibition at the Hugo Gallery named "Fifteen Drawings Based on the Writings of Truman Capote" (June 16 – July 3, 1952).

In 1953, Jan Yoors, the Belgian-born artist working in tapestry, painting, sculpture, and photography, had one of his first New York solo exhibitions at the gallery.

The director of the gallery was Alexander Iolas, assisted by David Mann. Alexander Iolas after working at the Hugo Gallery, founded the Jackson-Iolas Gallery in 1955 with former dancer, Brooks Jackson and later created a network of galleries under his own name. David Mann after working at the Hugo Gallery became the director of Bodley Gallery.

== Sources ==
- Andy Warhol and Hugo Gallery
- René Magritte and Hugo Gallery
- Smithsonian Archives of American Art - interview with Brooks Jackson, dealer
- Utopia Parkway: The Life And Work Of Joseph Cornell
