= National Museum of Contemporary Art, Athens =

National Museum of Contemporary Art

- Established: 2000
- Location: Kallirrois Ave. & Amvrosiou Frantzi Str., 117 43, Athens, Greece
- Type: Museum of contemporary art
- Director: Katerina Gregos
- Public transit access: Syngrou–Fix station
- Website: www.emst.gr

The National Museum of Contemporary Art (EMST Εθνικό Μουσείο Σύγχρονης Τέχνης (ΕΜΣΤ)), is a national museum focused on exhibiting contemporary Greek and international art in Athens. It was established in October 2000. Its founding director, Anna Kafetsi, previously served as curator for the 20th century collection at the National Gallery of Athens.

== History ==
The museum was initially opened on the ground floor of the old Fix Brewery in Athens, with approximately 1800 square meters of space. Ownership of the Fix building was transferred from the subway authority Attica Metro, which owned the former brewery since the 1990s, to the museum foundation.

The museum is located near the center of Athens as well as its primary archaeological sites, including the Acropolis and the Acropolis Museum. As of 2020, the building is being restored to create state-of-the-art facilities for the permanent collection, periodic exhibitions, educational programs, and workshops. 3SK Stylianidis Architects won an international competition to complete the renovation of the Fix Building, in collaboration with Ioannis Mouzakis and Associates and others.

While renovations are underway, EMST displays its exhibitions in parts of the Athens Conservatory.

The Greek government has spent 40 million euros on the museum by 2020, with the Stavros Niarchos Foundation giving a further 3 million euros. The delays in the museum's opening cost EMST a 3.3 million dollar subsidy from the European Union.

=== Directors ===
- Anna Kafetsi (2000-2014), Founding Director
- Katerina Koskina (2014-2018)
- Dimitris Antonakakis & Syrago Tsiara (2019-2021) Interim Directors
- Katerina Gregos (2021-present)

== Collections ==
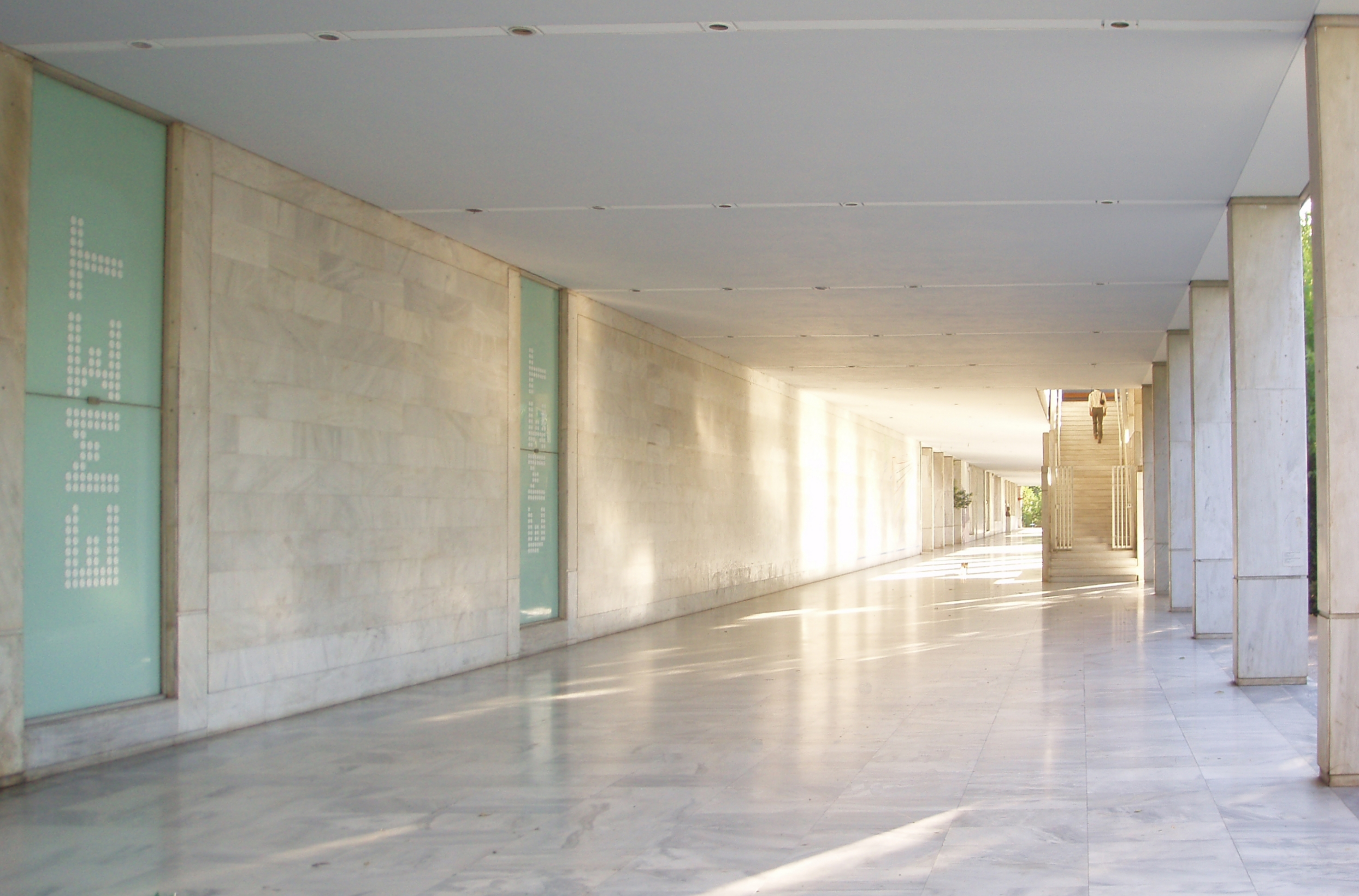
National Museum of Contemporary Art

The most important part of the EMST's artistic policy is enhancement and enrichment of its permanent collections with works from Greek and international artists. There are two main axons according to which the collections are structured: a historic one, dating from the second half of the 20th century, and a contemporary one.

The museum is growing its permanent collections through purchasing works of art as well as seeking donations. EMST aims at developing, within the next few years, a core collection of works representative of the basic directions of contemporary art.

Among the museum's acquisitions are works by Ilya Kabakov, Stephen Antonakos, Gary Hill, Nan Goldin, Vadim Zakharov, Gillian Wearing, Ann Sofi Siden, Vlassis Caniaris, Nikos Kessanlis, Eleni Mylonas, Dimitris Alithinos, Nikos Navridis, Joel Sanders, Allan Sekula, Costas Tsoclis, George Hadjimichalis, Chryssa, Yiannis Psychopedis, Andreas Angelidakis, LTL Architects and Tessera.

A rich collection of video art has also been developed. Among the most prominent artists are: Bill Viola, Bruce Nauman, Nam June Paik, Mona Hatoum, Vito Acconci, Dan Graham, Robert Wilson, Tony Oursler, Marina Abramović & Ulay, Eleni Mylonas, Chris Burden, Lynda Benglis, Sadie Benning, Sophie Calle & Gregory Shephard, Carolee Schneemann, Martha Rosler, Dara Birnbaum, Walid Ra’ad/The Atlas Group and Jayce Salloum.

In 2022, EMST received a donation of 140 contemporary art pieces through the D.Daskalopoulos Collection Gift, including major works by artists Kutluğ Ataman, Abraham Cruzvillegas, Paul McCarthy, Ana Mendieta, Annette Messager as well as many Greek artists.

== Exhibitions ==
Within the framework of the exhibition policy of EMST, series of periodical exhibitions of open and explorative character are presented, on issues, investigations, and quests of international contemporary art, individual works commissioned by the Museum, mid-career retrospectives of contemporary artists, and historical retrospectives on the fields of painting, installations, photography, video, new media, and "experimental" architecture. Until the Museum building will have been completed and will be able to open its doors to the public, the permanent collections (both historical and contemporary) are presented in periodical exhibitions with selections of thematic and conceptual nuclei or artistic tendencies.

== Educational Programs ==
Within the framework of the educational policy of EMST educational programs for school groups and families, children workshops, tours for adults, and educators' seminars are realized, aiming at contributing to the discovery of and familiarization with contemporary art, Greek and international, of all age audiences.

== Research ==
Aside from the permanent collection, periodic exhibitions and educational programming, the museum directs its efforts toward establishing an important infrastructure for research and artistic creation in its premises. Within this framework, the National Museum of Contemporary Art will establish and organize a center for the production of audiovisual works of art as well as a center of digital documentation of contemporary art. Both centers will be developed with the support of the Ministry of Culture and the funding programs “Culture” and “Information Society” of the European Union.

== Publications ==
The EMST editorial program includes bilingual (in Greek and English) exhibition catalogs, which host theoretical and critical essays, as well as interdisciplinary interpretational approaches bu sociologists, anthropologists, philosophers, e.a. Special educational booklets for Primary and Secondary ( High School and Lyceum) education, as well as editions with the Museum new Acquisitions. A series of editions of Critical Essays on contemporary art, as well as artists' monographs based on unpublished material of The Archives of Greek Artists is being prepared.

== Library and Archives ==
The Library of EMST includes a significant number of specialized editions and journals on the fields of History and Theory of Art, Museology and Conservation of art works as well as on the field of History of Philosophy, Anthropology, Architecture and Industrial Design, New Technologies and Multimedia and is constantly enriched in order to serve scientific research and writing as well as the induction of the staff, of the visitors/researchers and artists. Also, a project for the exchange of editions with institutions in Greece and abroad has already been initiated.

Greek artists and galleries have granted to the museum archives related to contemporary Greek art, after an invitation by EMST. The archives are constituted by catalogues, books, exhibition invitations, audiovisual material, texts by artists, correspondence, critiques, reviews, reproductions of works and biographical data.

The donation of the archives of Bia Davou and Pandelis Xagoraris by their son Zafos Xagoraris is exceptionally significant. It contains more than 2.000 articles and manuscripts of the two artists, their correspondence between them and also with other fellow artists, correspondence with official Fine Arts institutions, such as the Chamber of Fine Arts and the Ministry of Culture, archival material of the DESMOS gallery, which played a leading role in the artistic scene of the '70s, archival material from the Association of Contemporary Art and Artists and more.

== See also ==
- List of national galleries
- National Gallery (Athens)
- Municipal Gallery of Athens
- Benaki Museum, Athens
- State Museum of Contemporary Art, Thessaloniki
