= Georgios Mylonas =

Greek politician

- Γεώργιος Μυλωνάς
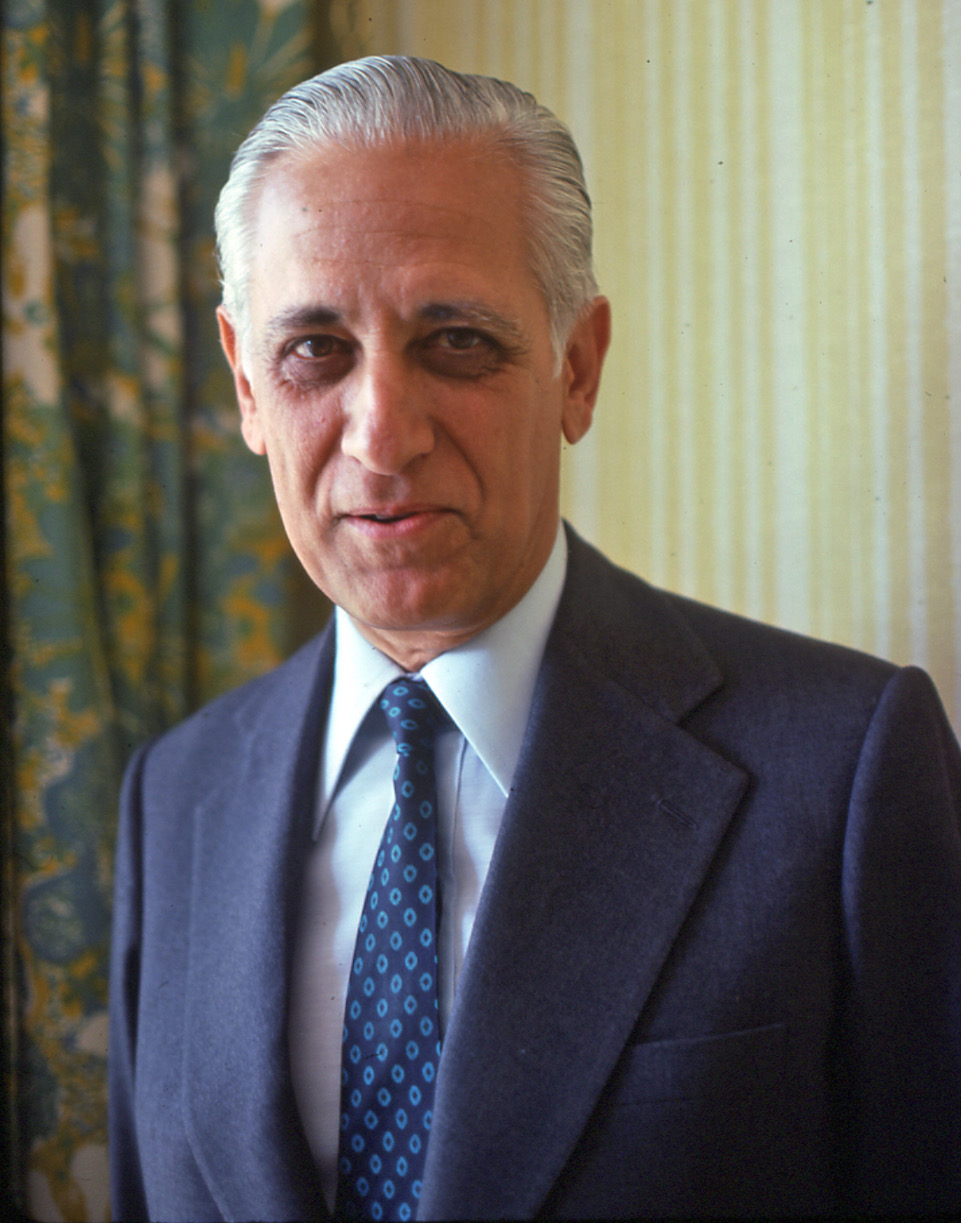
- Georgios Mylonas in 1983
- Born: 6 April 1919; Paris, France
- Died: 14 February 1998 (aged 79); Kifisia, Athens, Greece
- Spouse: Alex Mylona (m. 1940; div. 1976) Kakia Saranti (m. 1977)
- Children: Maria Mylona-Kyriakidi, Eleni Mylonas, Alexandros Mylonas
- Relatives: Panagiotis Danglis (grandfather), Alexandros Mylonas (father)

Georgios Mylonas (Greek: Γεώργιος Αλεξάνδρου Μυλωνάς; 6 April 1919 – 14 February 1998) was a Greek Center Union politician and government minister. He was a close aide to Greek statesman and premier Georgios Papandreou, and was repeatedly elected deputy for the Ioannina seat with the Center Union. Mylonas had served as an undersecretary to the premier's office and education undersecretary from 1963 to 1965. He assumed the transport ministry in the first post-junta government in 1974 and was Minister for Culture from 1989 to 1990. Mylonas was the author of the book Escape From Amorgos, detailing his escape from the island, where he was exiled during the 1967-1974 military dictatorship. The escape was organized by his then, son-in-law Elias B.M. Kulukundis and his daughter Eleni Mylonas with the help of Maria Becket.

== Books ==
- George Mylonas (1974). Escape From Amorgos: The Story of a Greek Political Prisoner's Struggle for Freedom. Scribners. ISBN 0-684-13729-1
- Απόδραση από την Αμοργό, Γιώργος Μυλωνάς, Ποταμός, 2015, ISBN 978-960-545-045-8
- Elias B.M. Kulukundis (2013). The Amorgos Conspiracy. ISBN 978-960-20-0166-0

== Documentary ==
- Stelios Kouloglou, Escape From Amorgos, 1984 Productions AE-Tvxs.gr, 2015

== Press ==
- Nicholas Gage (21 September 1969). "The Prisoner of Amorgos". The New York Times.
- Thomas J. Hamilton (11 October 1969). "Greek Who Fled Hopes to Mobilize All Shades of Opinion Against Military Regime". The New York Times.
- "Greece: The L.B.J. Caper", Time. 17 October 1969.
- "International, Greece: One Man's Odyssey". Newsweek. 20 October 1969.
- Hendrik Hertzberg (10 April 1970). "Democrat". The New Yorker.
- Nicholas Gage & Ilias Kulukundis (1970). "Report From Greece - Under the Junta". The American Scholar.

Political offices
| Preceded by Melina Mercouri | Minister for Culture; 1989 | Succeeded by Sotiris Kouvelas |
| Preceded by Sotiris Kouvelas | Minister for Culture; 1990 | Succeeded by Tzannis Tzannetakis |
