= MOMus–Museum of Contemporary Art =

Contemporary art museum in Thessaloniki, Central Macedonia, Greece founded in 1979

Coordinates: 40.6272°N 22.9548°E

MOMus Contemporary, in full MOMus–Museum of Contemporary Art–Macedonian Museum of Contemporary Art and State Museum of Contemporary Art Collections, is a contemporary art museum in Thessaloniki, Central Macedonia, Greece, located in the area of the Thessaloniki International Fair. It was formerly known as the Macedonian Museum of Contemporary Art (MMCA, Greek: Μακεδονικό Μουσείο Σύγχρονης Τέχνης, ΜΜΣΤ).

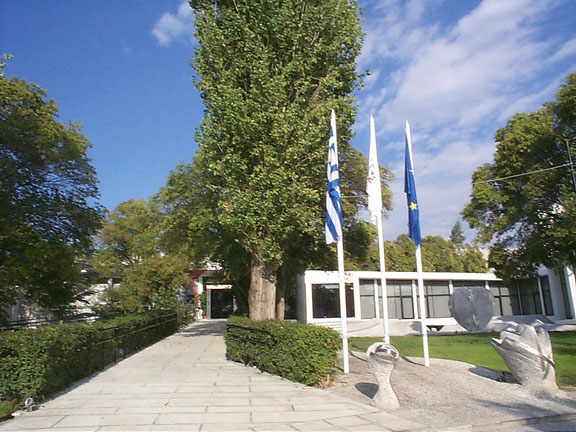
View from outside

== History ==
The museum was founded in 1979 by a group of visionary citizens of Thessaloniki. In a conversation between Maro Lagia and gallerist and collector Alexandros Iolas, after the latter had shown a keen interest in the damage inflicted on monuments by the 1978 Thessaloniki earthquake, Lagia proposed the creation of a contemporary art centre in Thessaloniki. Iolas's response was immediate –"Oh yes, no more hospitals and orphanages; a centre of contemporary art; that's exactly what Thessaloniki needs."

Alexandros Iolas's encounter with Thessaloniki was to acquire special significance, not only for the city but also for the posthumous fame of this singularly perceptive collector. There is nothing in Greece today to recall his inspired and creative sojourn in the country save the collection of the 47 works that he donated a generation ago as a "nucleus" around which to build a museum of contemporary art in this city.

It was with great joy that the board of directors decided to honour him by giving his name to the museum's new three-storey wing and to dedicate to him the catalogue of the permanent collection, which now numbers more than one thousand works (paintings, sculptures, installations, assemblages, engravings, photographs), in the hope that the museum will remain independent, unconventional and open-minded, that is guided by the same principles that characterised Iolas himself.

The gesture made by Alexandros Iolas, the museum's first great benefactor, found its followers. Well-known collectors, including Magda Kotzia, Franz Geiger, Alexandros and Dorothea Xydis, Giorgos Apergis and Dimitris Meïmaroglou, and with them a host of artists, continue to offer collections and individual works, constantly expanding the museum's collection.

In addition to our gratitude to all the artist-donors who have thus supported the museum, we wish to express our immense appreciation of their work. The formal and conceptual qualities of their work succeed in establishing a dialectic relation with the young students through the museum's educational programmes. Thus, the artistic message is conveyed to the young people promoting their cultural awareness.

Since 2018, the museum has merged with MOMus Modern, MOMus Experimental, MOMus Photography, and other institutions under the Metropolitan Organisation of Museums of Visual Arts of Thessaloniki (MOMus) umbrella.

== The permanent collection ==
At present the museum's permanent collection comprises 2000 works by Greek and foreign artists, it is constantly being augmented by gifts from collectors, artists, gallery owners, and private individuals and constantly presented in the museum's new wing.

Apart from the permanent display, the museum has mounted over 100 exhibitions of works by Greek and foreign artists: retrospectives of the work of Yannis Tsarouchis, Tsoclis, Photios Kontoglou, Nikos Hadjikyriakos-Ghikas, Kokkinidis, Alekos Fassianos, Aggelika Korovessi, Spyropoulos, Psychopaidis, Pavlos, Kessanlis, Akrithakis, Andy Warhol, Katzourakis and Perdikidis have been held for the first time in Greece; and other exhibitions have been devoted to the works of Fluxus, Robert and Sonia Delaunay, Roberto Matta, Viallat, Joseph Beuys, Uecker, David Hockney, Max Ernst, Barlach, Max Beckmann, Vlassis Kaniaris, Takis, Molfessis, Lazongas, Papadimitriou, Stephen Antonakos, Zongolopoulos, Mytaras, Triandafyllou, Ekonomopoulos, Alithinos and many other artists.

The museum has published more than fifty bilingual catalogues to accompany solo and group exhibitions.

== Educational programs ==
The museum organises educational programmes relating to its temporary exhibitions and permanent display, and also devises programmes for other visual arts institutions. With the help of museum educationalists, tens of thousands of children have enjoyed learning about art.

It also offers guided tours and, in the framework of EU programmes, collaborates with other museums with a view to devising educational programmes for adults.

== Events ==
Other events hosted by the museum include lectures, discussions on subjects relating to aesthetics, art history, and the organisation of museums and collections, presentations of books and art projects, meetings with artists, happenings, and bazaars.

== Library ==
In the library two-and-a-half thousand titles of books and periodicals on subjects relating to painting, sculpture, engraving, architecture, and photography, all the catalogues published by the museum, audio-visual material, and the museum's archive of artists are available to the public.

== Art shop ==
The art shop sells the museum's own publications, other art publications, both for adults and for children, works of art both unique and produced as series, utilitarian objects of an artistic nature, jewellery designed by artists, educational CD-ROMs, music CDs, posters, cards, and other inspired and inspiring gifts.

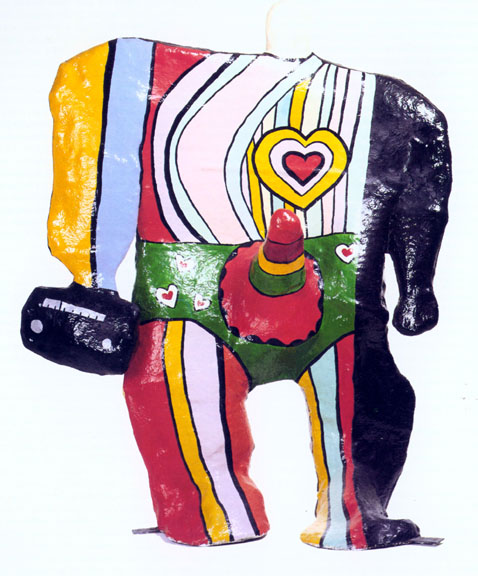
Niki de Saint Phalle, Adam

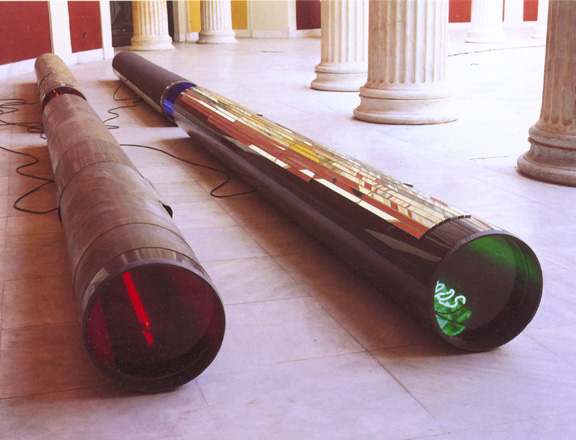
Bouteas, 4 dimensions

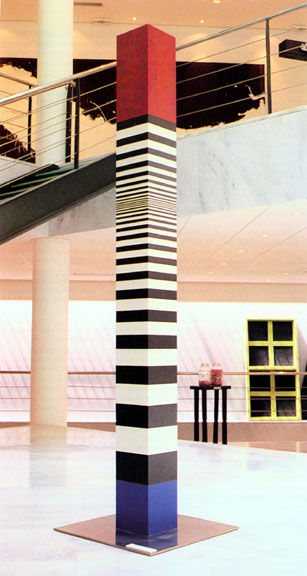
Zouni, Red column

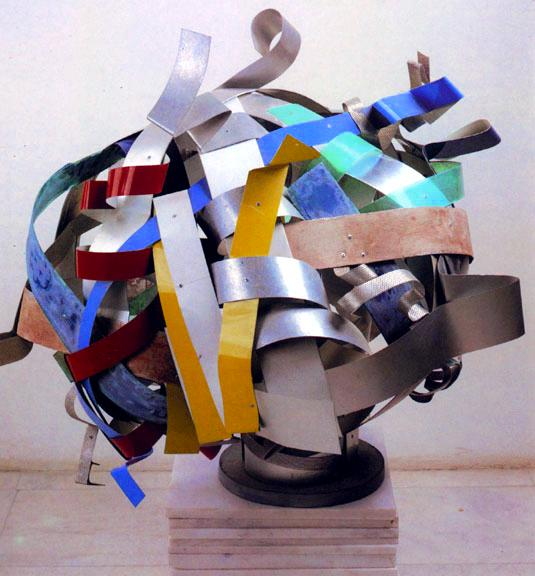
Dennis Oppenheim, Explosions
