= Streit =

Streit is a surname, and may refer to:

- Albert Streit (born 1980), German football player
- Clarence Streit [ʃtʀaɪ̯t] (1896–1986), American journalist and Atlanticist
- Esther Streit-Wurzel (1932−2013), Israeli children's books author and educator, a daughter of Shalom Streit
- Georgios Streit, Στρέιτ (1868–1948), Greek lawyer and professor
- Jindřich Štreit (born 1946), Czech photographer and pedagogue
- Kurt Streit (born 1959), Austrian-American tenor
- Mario Streit (born 1967), German rower
- Mark Streit (born 1977), Swiss ice hockey player
- Marlene Streit (born 1934), Canadian golfer
- Martin Streit (born 1977), Czech ice hockey player
- Michael J. Streit (born 1950), American lawyer and judge
- Oscar Streit (1873–1935), American baseball player
- Roberto Streit (born 1983), Brazilian racing driver
- Saul S. Streit (1897–1983), Polish-American lawyer, politician, and judge
- Shalom Streit (1888–1946), Hebrew-language educator, literary critic, and writer
- Sigismund Streit (1687–1775), German merchant and art patron
- Stefanos Streit, Στρέιτ (1837–1920), Greek jurist, banker and politician

Surname used as given name

- Samuel Streit Coursen (1926–1950), American military officer and Medal of Honor recipient
- Richard Streit Hamilton (1943–2024), American mathematician
- Christian Streit White (1839–1917), American military officer, court clerk, and politician

Organizations

- Streit Council, a nonprofit foreign-policy organization
- C. F. Streit Mfg. Co., a Cincinnati furniture manufacturer in the 19th and 20th centuries
- STREIT Group, an armoured vehicle manufacturer, based in Ras Al Khaimah, United Arab Emirates
