= Konstantinos Tsaldaris =

Greek politician

- Κωνσταντίνος Τσαλδάρης
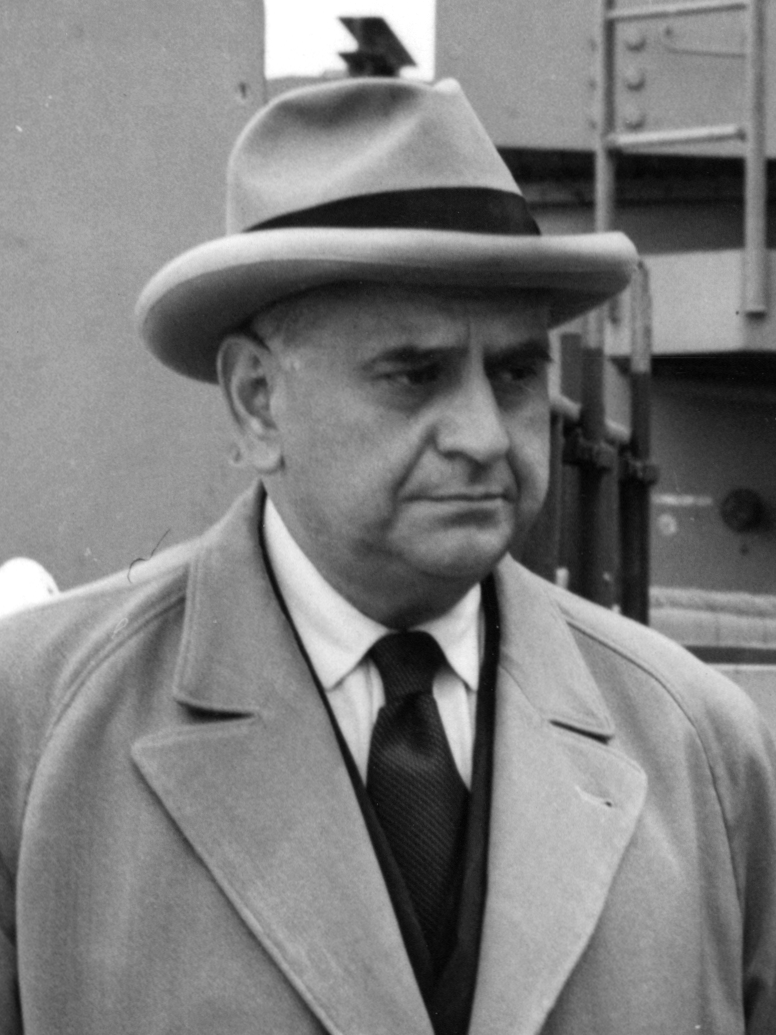

Prime Minister of Greece
- In office 29 August 1947 – 7 September 1947
- Monarch: Paul
- Preceded by: Dimitrios Maximos
- Succeeded by: Themistoklis Sofoulis
- In office 18 April 1946 – 24 January 1947
- Monarch: George II
- Regent: Archbishop Damaskinos (until September 1946)
- Preceded by: Panagiotis Poulitsas
- Succeeded by: Dimitrios Maximos

Personal details
- Born: 14 April 1884 Alexandria, Egypt
- Died: 15 November 1970 (aged 86) Athens, Greece

Konstantinos Tsaldaris (Greek: Κωνσταντίνος Τσαλδάρης; 14 April 1884 – 15 November 1970) was a Greek politician and twice Prime Minister of Greece.

== Biography ==
Tsaldaris was born in Alexandria, Egypt. He studied law at the University of Athens as well as Berlin, London and Florence. He became a prefectural politician from 1915 to 1917.

In 1926, he was elected as a deputy for the first time in the Argolidocorinthia prefecture (now split into Argolis and Corinthia) with the Freethinkers' Party of Ioannis Metaxas. In 1928, he became a member of the People's Party, the leader of which was his uncle Panagis Tsaldaris. He entered Panagis Tsaldaris' second government as Vice Minister of Transportation from 1933 to 1935, and continued as Under-Secretary to the Prime Minister. After the death of Panagis Tsaldaris in 1936, he became a member of the administrative commission of the People's Party, which was however soon dissolved under the dictatorship of Metaxas.

After Liberation in 1944, he was recognized as the leader of the reborn People's Party, and won in the controversial 1946 elections as leader of the right-wing "United Patriotic Party" coalition and became prime minister of Greece from April 1946 through January 1947. His government carried out the plebiscite on the return of the monarchy in August 1946.

During 1947-1949 he acted as the head of the Greek representation in the UN General Assembly. He was Deputy Prime Minister during the governments of Dimitrios Maximos (1947), Themistoklis Sophoulis (1947–1949) and Alexandros Diomidis (1949–1950). He once again became prime minister from August 1947 until September of the same year.

With the foundation and rise to power of the Greek Rally of Marshal Alexandros Papagos, the People's party lost a large part of its electoral base and Tsaldaris did not win in the 1952 election. He was voted into Parliament with the Liberal Democratic Union, in the 1956 elections, but in the 1958 elections, as head of the Union of Populars, he failed to be elected. Shortly afterwards he ended his political career. He died in Athens in 1970.

Political offices
Preceded by Panagiotis Poulitsas	Prime Minister of Greece; 1946–1947	Succeeded by Dimitrios Maximos
Preceded by Dimitrios Maximos	Prime Minister of Greece; 1947	Succeeded by Themistoklis Sofoulis
