= Dimitrios Maximos =

Greek banker and politician

- Δημήτριος Μάξιμος
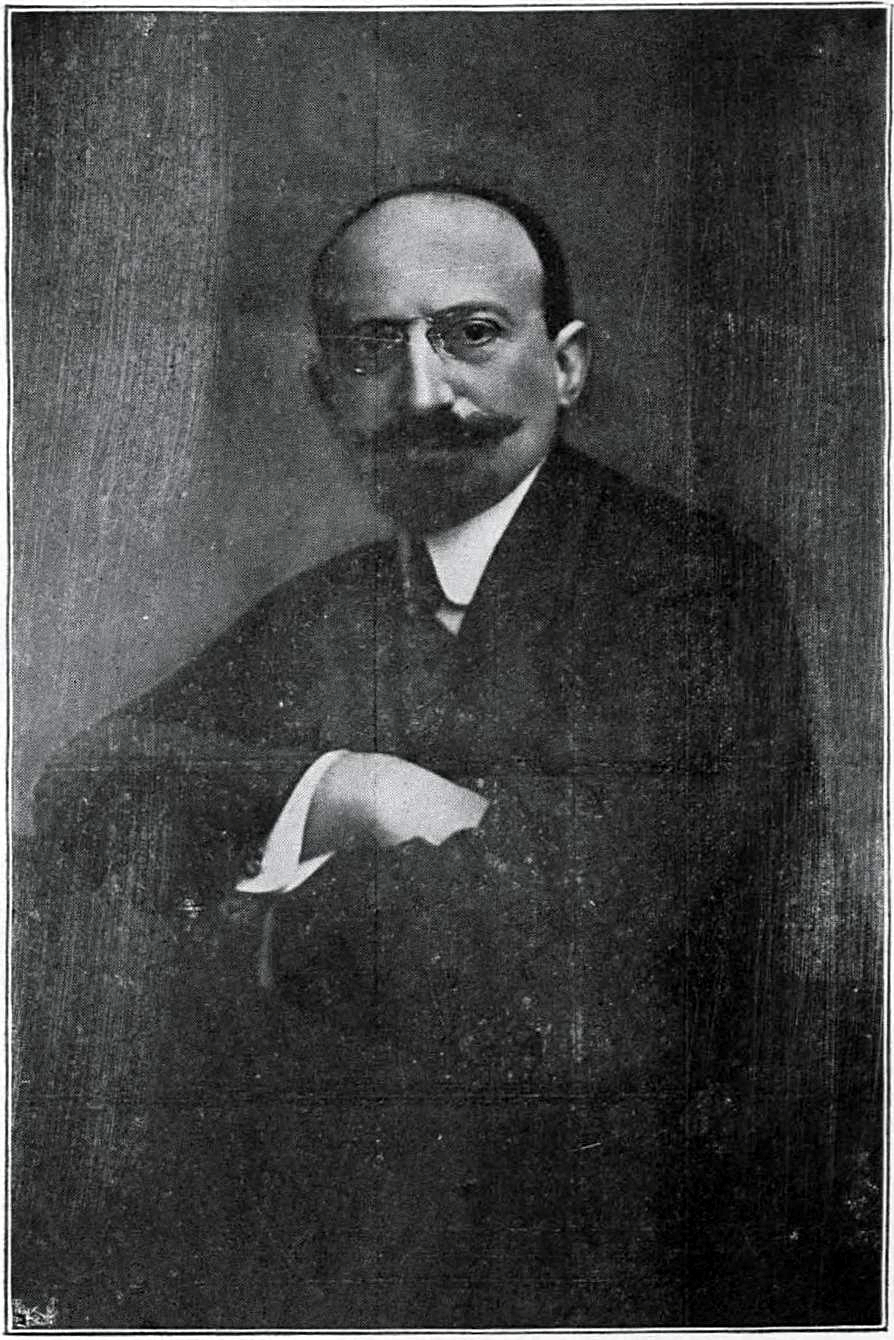
- A photograph of Dimitrios Maximos

Prime Minister of Greece
- In office 24 January 1947 – 29 August 1947
- Monarch: George II; Paul
- Preceded by: Konstantinos Tsaldaris
- Succeeded by: Konstantinos Tsaldaris

Foreign Minister
- In office 10 March 1933 – 3 March 1935
- President: Alexandros Zaimis
- Prime Minister: Panagis Tsaldaris
- Preceded by: Nikolaos Mavroudis
- Succeeded by: Panagis Tsaldaris

Senator
- In office 31 March 1933 – 1 April 1935
- President: Alexandros Zaimis
- Prime Minister: Panagis Tsaldaris

Personal details
- Born: 6 July 1873 Patras, Kingdom of Greece
- Died: 17 October 1955 (aged 82) Athens, Kingdom of Greece
- Party: People's Party
- Relations: Andreas Londos; Stefanos Streit (uncle); Georgios Streit (cousin)
- Education: University of Athens; University of Paris
- Occupation: Banker
- Profession: Banker; Politician

Dimitrios E. Maximos (Greek: Δημήτριος Μάξιμος; 6 July 1873 – 17 October 1955) was a Greek banker and politician. He briefly served as Prime Minister of Greece after World War II.

== Life ==
Maximos was born on 6 July 1873 in Patras. He began his career in banking in 1891 and was employed at the National Bank of Greece. In 1920 Maximos became governor of the bank before resigning in 1922. Between 1933 and 1935, he became Foreign Minister of the government of Panagis Tsaldaris. He was Prime Minister of Greece in 1947.

He died on 17 October 1955.

His home in central Athens, the Maximos Mansion, serves since 1982 as the official seat of the Prime Minister of Greece.

Political offices
Preceded by Nikolaos Mavroudis	Foreign Minister of Greece; 1933–1935	Succeeded by Panagis Tsaldaris
Preceded by Panagis Tsaldaris	Foreign Minister of Greece; 1935	Succeeded by Ioannis Theotokis
Preceded by Konstantinos Tsaldaris	Prime Minister of Greece; 25 January – 29 August 1947	Succeeded by Konstantinos Tsaldaris
