= Georgios Ergazakis =

Greek lawyer and politician

Georgios K. Ergazakis (Greek: Γεώργιος Κ. Εργαζάκης; Pigaidouri, Kastelli, 1889 – 1979) was a Greek lawyer, politician and member of parliament for Heraklion.

== Biography ==
Ergazakis was born in Polithea, Heraklion. He studied law in Athens and worked as a lawyer in Heraklion. He was a candidate for Heraklion with the Liberal Party in the 1926 Greek legislative election, getting 1,584 votes, and in the 1946 election with the Independent Liberals, getting 606 votes. He was elected member of parliament for Heraklion with the Democratic Union in 1956.

His wife was Eutychia Plataki, from Tzermiado, Lasithi, who died in 1977.

Ergazakis died in 1979. In his will he created a scholarship for poor students, founding the Ergazakeio Foundation.
