= Tlumach Raion =

Former subdivision of Ivano-Frankivsk Oblast, Ukraine

Tlumach Raion Тлумацький район
- Raion
- Tlumatskyi raion
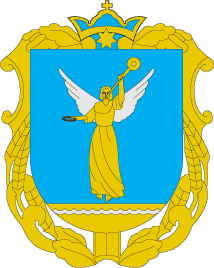
- Flag Coat of arms

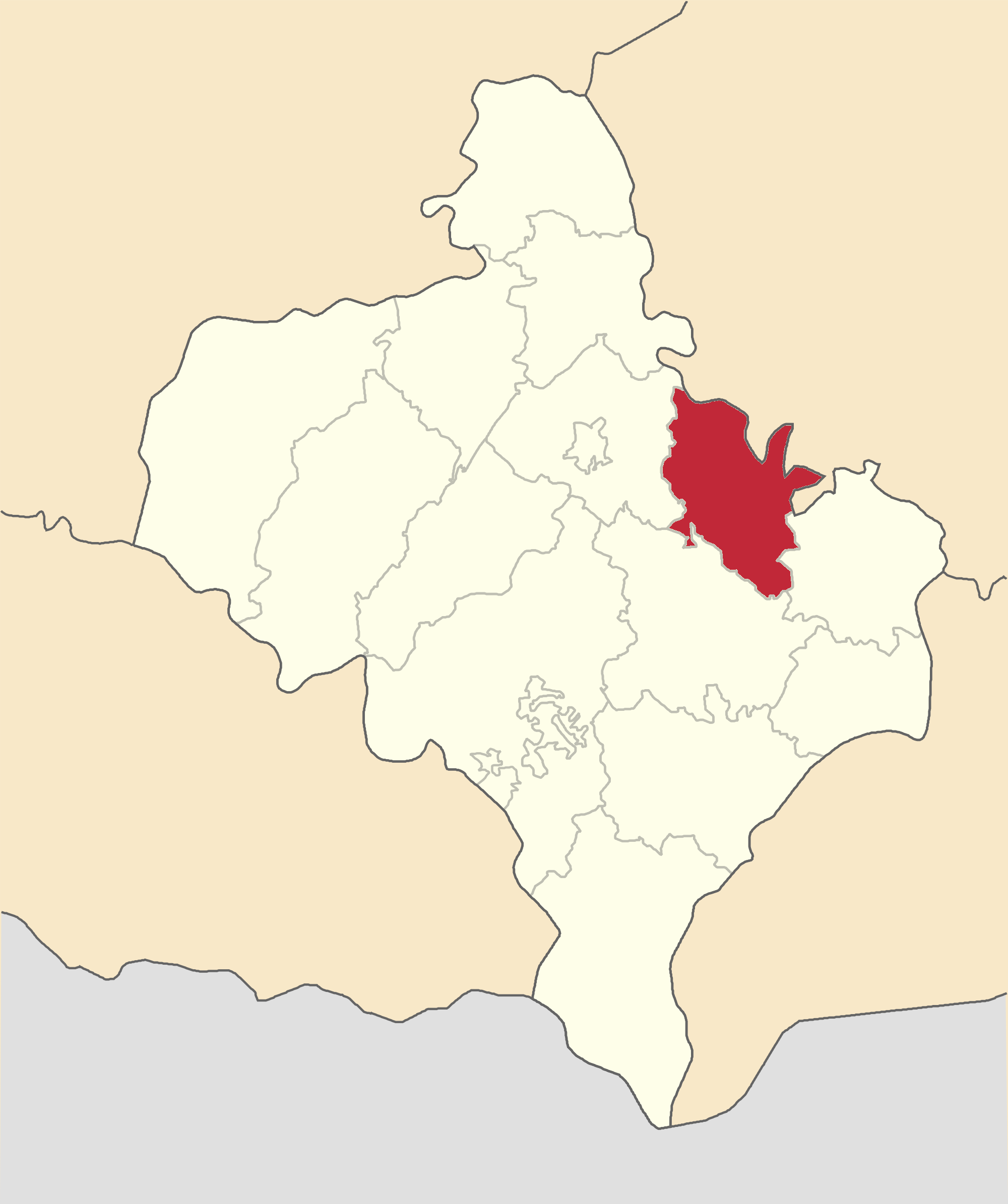
- Coordinates: 48°49′46″N 25°5′26″E
- Country: Ukraine
- Region: Ivano-Frankivsk Oblast
- Disestablished: 18 July 2020
- Subdivisions: List: — city councils; — settlement councils; — rural councils; Number of localities: — cities; — urban-type settlements; — villages; — rural settlements

Population (2020)
  - Total: 45,699
- Time zone: UTC+02:00 (EET)
  - Summer (DST): UTC+03:00 (EEST)
- Area code: +380

Tlumach Raion (Ukrainian: Тлумацький район, romanized: Tlumac'kyj rajon) was a raion (district) of the Ivano-Frankivsk Oblast (region) in Ukraine. The city of Tlumach was the administrative center of the raion. The raion was abolished on 18 July 2020 as part of the administrative reform of Ukraine, which reduced the number of raions of Ivano-Frankivsk Oblast to six. The area of Tlumach Raion was merged into Ivano-Frankivsk Raion. The last estimate of the raion population was 45,699 (2020 est.)

At the time of disestablishment, the raion consisted of three hromadas:

- Obertyn settlement hromada with the administration in the urban-type settlement of Obertyn;
- Olesha rural hromada with the administration in the selo of Olesha;
- Tlumach urban hromada with the administration in Tlumach.
