= Nikolaos A. Papageorgiou =

Greek doctor and politician

Nikolaos A. Papageorgiou (Greek: Νικόλαος Α. Παπαγεωργίου; 21 July 1901 - October 1983), was a Greek medical doctor and politician, who served as a Member of Parliament (MP) in Thessaly.

He was honoured with special commendations from Greece.

== Political career ==
He studied medicine. He was elected MP in the electoral district of Larissa Prefecture with the Liberal Party in 1950. He was reelected MP of Larissa-Magnesia with the National Radical Union in 1956 and of Magnesia in 1958 and 1961.

He died in October 1983 at age 82. His son, Ioannis, was elected MP with New Democracy in 1990.
