= PADE =

PADE may refer to:

- Deering Airport, Alaska, United States
- Progressive Agricultural Democratic Union, a Greek political party

== See also ==
- Pade, a village
