= Themistoklis Sofoulis =

19/20th-century Greek politician

- Θεμιστοκλής Σοφούλης
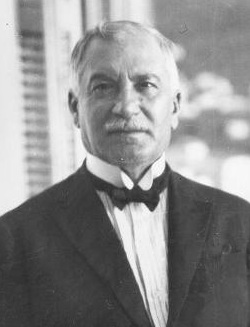

Prime Minister of Greece
- In office 7 September 1947 – 24 June 1949
- Monarch: Paul
- Preceded by: Konstantinos Tsaldaris
- Succeeded by: Alexandros Diomidis
- In office 22 November 1945 – 4 April 1946
- Monarch: George II
- Regent: Archbishop Damaskinos
- Preceded by: Panagiotis Kanellopoulos
- Succeeded by: Panagiotis Poulitsas
- In office 24 July 1924 – 7 October 1924
- President: Pavlos Kountouriotis
- Preceded by: Alexandros Papanastasiou
- Succeeded by: Andreas Michalakopoulos

Speaker of the Hellenic Parliament
- In office 26 November 1926 – 2 July 1928
- In office 15 February 1918 – 10 September 1920

Personal details
- Born: 24 November 1860 Vathy, Principality of Samos, Ottoman Empire (now Greece)
- Died: 24 June 1949 (aged 88) Athens, Greece
- Cause of death: Pulmonary edema
- Occupation: politician
- Profession: archaeologist

Themistoklis Sofoulis or Sophoulis (Greek: Θεμιστοκλής Σοφούλης; 24 November 1860 – 24 June 1949) was a prominent centrist and liberal Greek politician from Samos Island, who served three times as Prime Minister of Greece, with the Liberal Party, which he led for many years.

== Early life ==
Sofoulis was born in 1860 in Vathy of Samos, then an autonomous principality under Ottoman suzerainty. His father was Panagiotis Sofoulis, who had fought for the autonomy of the island. Sofoulis studied in the faculty of philosophy of the National and Kapodistrian University of Athens and then in Germany, where he specialised in archaeology. As an archaeologist he published certain insightful surveys and he participated actively in various excavations around Greece.

== Entering Samian politics ==
In 1900 he abandoned archaeological excavations and he was elected a deputy for Samos, being the leader of his own radical faction, which was fighting for the political freedoms of Samos, as stipulated by the Treaty of Autonomy of 1832. Soon, Sofoulis established himself as the head of the Progressives, who favoured reforms and union with the Kingdom of Greece. In 1902, he was elected president of the Samian parliament, effectively Prime Minister of the island.

Pro-Greek agitation and the reaction of the pro-autonomy faction led to increased tensions, and in May 1908 the Prince, Andreas Kopasis Omoudopoulos, asked for the intervention of the Turkish military. The ensuing riots left several dead and Sofoulis was forced to flee to Greece. With the outbreak of the First Balkan War, Sofoulis landed on the island with a group of exiled Samians and swiftly took control: the Ottoman garrison withdrew to Anatolia, and on 11/24 November 1912, the island's parliament officially declared union with Greece.

== Entering Greek politics ==
The unification took place officially on 2 March 1913. Sofoulis remained for a while as the president of the interim government of Samos until April 1914, when he was appointed Governor General of Macedonia. He remained in Thessaloniki until February 1915 when he resigned following the resignation of Eleftherios Venizelos as Prime Minister after a bitter dispute with King Constantine I.

Sofoulis was first elected a deputy to the Hellenic Parliament in the elections of May 1915. He also served as Interior Minister in Venizelos's National Defence government in Thessaloniki, during the National Schism. After the exile of Constantine I, Eleftherios Venizelos and his government returned to Athens, where Sofoulis was elected speaker of the Parliament. He held his post until 1920.

== Leader of the Liberal Party ==
After Venizelos fled from Greece, Sofoulis became the new leader of the Liberal Party. He served as prime minister, for the first time, from the 25 July 1924 to the 27 November 1924.

In 1926, after the overthrow of Theodoros Pangalos's dictatorship, he served as Speaker of the Parliament, until 1928, when Venizelos achieved a landslide victory in the elections of 1928. He served as Minister of Military Affairs until 1930, when he was re-elected as Speaker of the Parliament. During all these years he was recognised as the deputy leader of the Liberal Party, although such post did not, officially, exist. Sophoulis remained Speaker of the Parliament until the elections of 1933, when the Liberal Party suffered a defeat and the People's Party formed a government under the leadership of Panagis Tsaldaris.

During the dramatic events, which led to the resignation of Panagis Tsaldaris and the restoration of the constitutional monarchy, Themistoklis Sofoulis kept a moderate stance, which was appreciated by King George II. On 16 March 1936 Sofoulis was re-elected Speaker of the Parliament. The same year he signed the notorious Sofoulis-Sklavainas Pact with the KKE.

During Ioannis Metaxas's dictatorship, Sofoulis remained aloof from developments, although the regime's increasing tendency towards Fascism caused him to send a warning letter to King George II in April 1939. During the Axis Occupation of Greece, Sofoulis, like most of the established politicians, remained rather passive, although he maintained contacts to the Allies in the Middle East. He refused an offer to cooperate with the National Liberation Front (EAM), and accused it of plotting to seize power and install a Communist regime after Liberation. On 19 May 1944, the Germans arrested him along with other politicians and imprisoned him in the Haidari concentration camp, where he remained until Liberation in October.

Themistoklis Sofoulis served as head of the Greek government from 1945 to 4 April 1946, but in the legislative elections of 1946 he suffered defeat at the hands of the People's Party of Konstantinos Tsaldaris. His efforts to prevent the outbreak of the Greek Civil War by reaching out to the Communists and offering amnesty were rebuffed by the People's Party, leading Sofoulis to abstain from the government of Dimitrios Maximos. However, on 7 September 1947 he became prime minister once again in a government of both the Liberal Party and the People's Party. Sofoulis undertook further efforts to end the conflict, negotiating with KKE for a general amnesty and a possible coalition government between it and the Liberals, provided that EAM's new armed force, known as the "Democratic Army of Greece", disarmed. Under intense US pressure, these proposals were abandoned, and the war took its course.

He died, however, before the end of the civil conflicts, in Kifissia, on the 24 June 1949, at the age of 88.

== Legacy ==
Although he belonged to the center, Sofoulis led the government and the royal army during the civil war. He was admired for his lucidity and his courage despite his age and he was revered by all the politicians of the center-left, the center and the right.

The main characteristic of his political career was his ability to balance. That is why during 1935–1940 he was not outspoken against the King or against the dictatorship. This ability of his allowed him to lead the country during the Civil War and to convince General Alexandros Papagos to return to active service, although the latter belonged to the right wing of the political spectrum.

Political offices
Preceded by Alexandros Papanastasiou	Prime Minister of Greece; 24 July 1924 – 7 October 1924	Succeeded by Andreas Michalakopoulos
Preceded by Panagiotis Kanellopoulos	Prime Minister of Greece; 22 November 1945 – 4 April 1946	Succeeded by Panagiotis Poulitsas
Preceded by Konstantinos Tsaldaris	Prime Minister of Greece; 7 September 1947 – 24 June 1949	Succeeded by Alexandros Diomidis
