= Yakivka =

Rural locality in Ivano-Frankivsk Oblast, Ukraine

Yakivka Яківка
- Location in Ivano-Frankivsk Oblast Yakivka (Ukraine)
- Coordinates: 48°39′30″N 25°10′16″E
- Country: Ukraine
- Oblast: Ivano-Frankivsk Oblast
- Raion: Ivano-Frankivsk Raion
- Hromada: Obertyn settlement hromada
- Time zone: UTC+2 (EET)
  - Summer (DST): UTC+3 (EEST)
- Postal code: 78064

Yakivka (Ukrainian: Яківка) is a village in the Obertyn settlement hromada of the Ivano-Frankivsk Raion of Ivano-Frankivsk Oblast in Ukraine.

== History ==
The village was founded in 1673.

On 19 July 2020, as a result of the administrative-territorial reform and liquidation of the Tlumach Raion, the village became part of the Ivano-Frankivsk Raion.

== Religion ==
- Church of the Nativity of the Virgin Mary (1824, wooden)

== Notable residents ==
- Władysław Kozicki (1879–1936), Polish art historian, critic and playwright
