= Nyzhniv =

Rural locality in Ivano-Frankivsk Oblast, Ukraine

Nyzhniv Нижнів
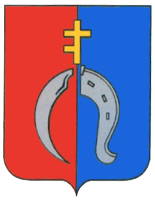
- Coat of arms
- Interactive map of Nyzhniv
- Coordinates: 48°56′42″N 25°05′48″E
- Country: Ukraine
- Oblast: Ivano-Frankivsk Oblast
- Raion: Ivano-Frankivsk Raion

Area
  - Total: 18,454 km^{2} (7,125 sq mi)

Population (2022 census)
  - Total: 2,000
  - Density: 10,789/km^{2} (27,940/sq mi)
- Time zone: UTC+2 (EET)
  - Summer (DST): UTC+3 (EEST)
- Postal code: 78013
- Area code: +380 3479

Nyzhniv (Ukrainian: Нижнів, Polish: Niżniów, German: Niznow) is a village in Ivano-Frankivsk Raion (district) of the Ivano-Frankivsk Oblast (province) in western Ukraine. Dniester River flows near the eastern edge of the village. Nyzhniv belongs to Tlumach urban hromada, one of the hromadas of Ukraine. In the village lived 2000 inhabitants in 2022.

Dniester Canyon begins near the village.

== History ==
Until 18 July 2020, Nyzhniv belonged to Tlumach Raion. The raion was abolished in July 2020 as part of the administrative reform of Ukraine, which reduced the number of raions of Ivano-Frankivsk Oblast to six. The area of Tlumach Raion was merged into Ivano-Frankivsk Raion.

== People ==
- Antin Levytsky, a Greek Catholic priest, who was Kost Levytsky's father.
- Anastasia Stanko, a Ukrainian journalist and television hostess, a member of the "Stop censorship" movement.

== Sources ==
- Dmytro Blazejowskyj, Historical Šematism of the Archeparchy of L'viv (1832-1944).— Kyiv: Publishing house «KM Akademia», 2004.— 570 p. ISBN 966-518-225-0
- Niżniów w Słowniku geograficznym Królestwa Polskiego i innych krajów słowiańskich, Tom VII (Netrebka – Perepiat) z 1886 r., P. 169. (in Polish)
