= Popular Social Party =

Popular Social Party Λαϊκό Κοινωνικό Κόμμα
- Founder: Stefanos Stefanopoulos
- Founded: 1956
- Dissolved: 1961
- Split from: People's Party
- Merged into: Centre Union
- Ideology: National conservatism Nationalism
- Political position: Right-wing

The Popular Social Party (Greek: Λαϊκό Κοινωνικό Κόμμα) was a Greek political party that formed after a split from the People's Party. It was founded in January 1956 by Stefanos Stefanopoulos.

The Popular Social Party participated in the elections of 1956 but failed to enter the parliament. In the elections of 1958 it participated with other right-wing parties in the Union of Populars and elected two MPs.

== Political program ==
Its main political program, as it was claimed, was social and economic justice. The party suggested social reforms and a new organization of the Greek economy.

== See also ==
- List of political parties in Greece
