= Kozicki =

Kozicki (feminine: Kozicka; plural: Koziccy) is a Polish surname. Notable people with the surname include:

- Marian Kozicki (born 1941), Polish equestrian
- Władysław Kozicki (1879–1936), Polish art historian and playwright
