= Anastasia Stanko =

Ukrainian journalist (born 1986)

- Анастасія Романівна Станко
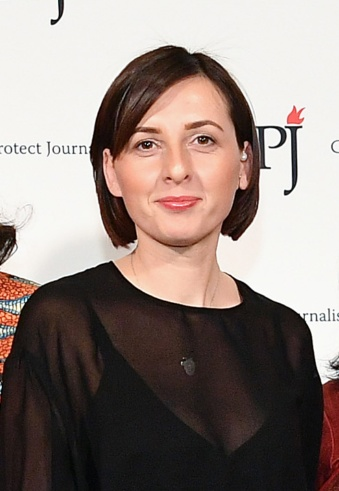
- Stanko at the 2018 CPJ International Press Freedom Awards
- Education: Lviv University
- Occupations: Journalist, war correspondent, television presenter
- Employer: Slidstvo.info
- Known for: Co-founding Hromadske; live-streaming the Euromaidan protests
- Title: Editor-in-chief
- Awards: Mezhyhiria Festival main prize (2016); CPJ International Press Freedom Award (2018); Courage in Journalism Award (2019)

Anastasia Romanivna "Nastia" Stanko (Ukrainian: Анастасія Романівна Станко, Anastasiia Romanivna Stanko, born 1986) is a Ukrainian journalist, war reporter and TV broadcaster. She co-founded Hromadske, Ukraine's first independent newsroom, and is the editor-in-chief of Slidstvo.info and a member of the "Stop Censorship" movement of journalists and media organizations. Stanko's reputation grew during her live-streaming of the Maidan Revolution. She was briefly held hostage in 2014 while covering the Donbas conflict.

== Biography ==
=== Early life and career ===
Stanko was born in 1986 in the village of Nyzhniv, Ivano-Frankivsk Oblast. After graduating from a gymnasium in Ivano Frankivsk, in 2003 she entered the journalism faculty of Lviv University. While a journalism student in Lviv, in 2004, Stanko participated in the Orange Revolution, which succeeded in ousting Russia-backed President Viktor Yanukovich from his first term in office.

In 2008 Stanko moved to Kyiv, where she worked as journalist for Pershyi, and, between 2011 and 2013, for TVi channel.

=== Later career ===
In 2013 Stanko co-founded Hromadske, Ukraine's first independent newsroom.

Stanko covered the 2013-2014 Maidan Revolution anti-government protests against Ukraine's second Yanukovych regime in Kyiv's central Maidan Square, by live-streaming the protests. Her channel was dubbed the voice of Maidan. She authored several investigations about the mass shooting of unarmed protestors by police in early 2014, and was awarded the Mezhyhiria Festival main prize in 2016 for this work.

In March 2014, she reported from Crimea on the illegitimate referendum and annexation of the peninsula by Russia. Two months later, she reported from the field about Russia's occupation of Donbas, a region in eastern Ukraine.

==== Kidnapping by Russian troops and their proxies ====
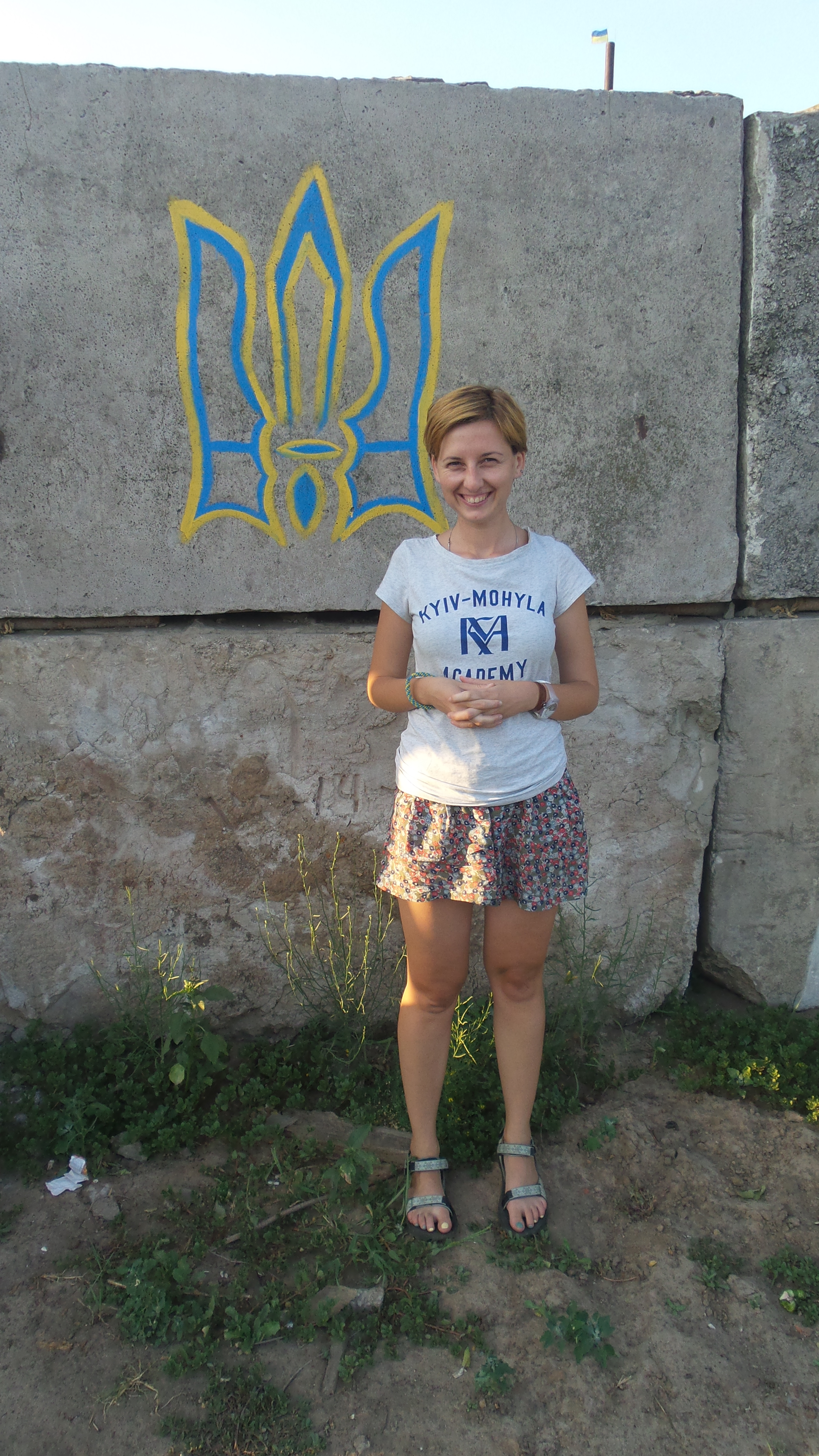
Stanko in Luhansk Oblast, 2014

On June 14, 2014 at around 12:30 pm, Stanko was detained for four hours by Russian Border Troops when she accidentally crossed the Russia–Ukraine border in the settlement of Milove, Luhansk Oblast (Ukraine). After her detention, Stanko was handed over to Ukrainian authorities with the request to pay a fine of 3,000 rubles and delete any photo and video materials.

On June 16, 2014, "Stop Censorship" organized a press conference in Kharkiv, where Stanko shared her experience. In an interview with the ATN television broadcasting company, she said that she went on the assignment because Milove — where the Ukraine-Russia border ran unmarked along one street — would be the best place to report on the condition of the Ukraine-Russia border.

On June 30, 2014, while Stanko and her cameraman, Ilya Bezkorovainy were on a fact-finding mission for Hromadske near Stanytsia Luhanska in eastern Ukraine, five men armed with AK-47s boarded their bus and put black hoods over their heads. They were taken by mini-bus, allegedly by agents of Russia's People's Commissariat for Internal Affairs (NKVD) to a basement which she later learned was located near the administrative offices of the Luhansk People's Republic (LNR), which was created in 2014 in the region by Russian-backed paramilitaries.

On July 1, LNR leader Valeriy Bolotov announced that they had been charged with "spying for the Ukrainian army." On July 2, 2014 they were released. Soon afterwards, one of Stanko's captors texted her several "lovesick" messages, and her husband joined the Ukrainian Army.

In an interview on Podrobnosti on July 6, 2014 Stanko claimed that she had been held by same people who were holding Nadiya Savchenko.

In 2018 Stanko received the International Press Freedom Award, and in 2019 was honored by the International Women's Media Foundation. She was editor-in-chief of Hromadske from 2020 to 2021, and left to report from the front of the Russian invasion of Ukraine. Since 2023 she been the editor-in-chief of Slidstvo.info, an investigative news agency.

== Recognition ==
- Mezhyhiria Festival main prize, 2016
- Committee to Protect Journalists International Press Freedom Award, 2018
- International Women's Media Foundation Courage in Journalism Award, 2019

== Other activities ==
Stanko is a member of the Plast organization.
