= Union of Populars =

Union of Populars Ένωσις Λαϊκών
- Leader: Konstantinos Tsaldaris
- Founded: 1957
- Dissolved: 1958
- Ideology: National conservatism Nationalism
- Political position: Right-wing

The Union of Populars (Greek: Ένωσις Λαϊκών) was a coalition of Greek right-wing political parties for the elections of 1958.

Its main leader was Konstantinos Tsaldaris. Members to the coalition were:

- People's Party
- Popular Social Party
- Party of Nationalists
- Reform Party
- and other small right-wing parties

== See also ==
- List of political parties in Greece
