= Władysław Kozicki =

Polish art historian, critic and playwright (1879–1936)

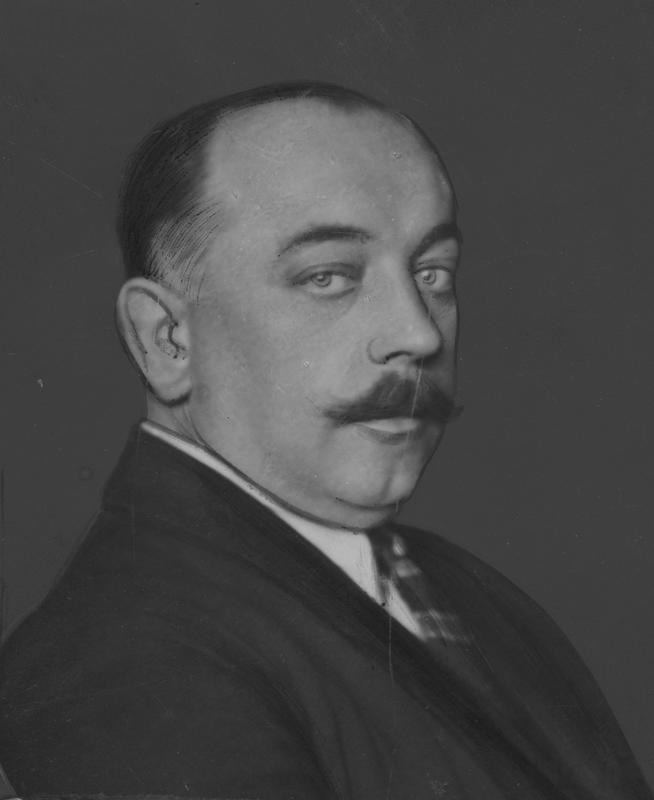
- Born: 29 October 1879; Yakivka, Ivano-Frankivsk Oblast, Ukraine
- Died: 12 January 1936 (aged 56); Lviv
- Education: University of Lviv
- Occupations: Art historian, critic and playwright

Władysław Kozicki (29 October 1879 – 12 January 1936) was a Polish art historian, critic and playwright. Member of the Polish Philosophical Society (1908), and the Scientific Society of Lviv.

== Biography ==
Władysław Kozicki was born on 29 October 1879, in Yakivka (now Obertyn Hromada, Ivano-Frankivsk Raion, Ivano-Frankivsk Oblast, Ukraine).

He studied jurisprudence and philosophy while a student at the Faculty of Philosophy of University of Lviv.

In 1905, he received his doctoral degree, and in 1922, he completed his habilitation, using his published dissertation "Michał Anioł" (Lviv; Warsaw, 1908) as the basis.

In 1898, he became an official of the Galician governorship, and in 1912, he became a member of the Council of Conservators of Eastern Galicia (he was the editor of the journal "Sprawozdania Grona Konserwatorów Galicji Wschodniej").

From 1922, he worked at University of Lviv, where from 1926 to 1933 he was the head of the Department of Modern Art History, and from 1933 to 1934, he held the position of privatdozent.

He died in Lviv and was buried in field 70 of Lychakiv Cemetery. The grave has not been preserved.

== Works ==
Kozicki was the author of numerous works on various aspects of art. His research covered periods such as the Renaissance and Baroque, as well as Western European and Polish painting of the 19th and 20th centuries. He paid special attention to famous artists, delving into the psychological aspects of their work and the issue of the national character of art.

His articles and reviews, mostly of a popular science nature, were published in leading Lviv publications such as the magazines "Sztuki Piękne", "Wiadomości Artystyczne", "Kwartalnik Historyczny", and the newspaper "Slowo Polskie".

Works:

- "Leonardo da Vinci" (1908);
- "W gaju Akademosa: poezye i szkice krytyczne" (1912);
- "Henryk Rodakowski" (1927);
- "Władysław Jarocki" (1928).

Among his important works are the novel "Ziemia" (1925) and the plays "Wolne duchy" (1911), "Euforion" (1919), and "Święto kos" (1928).

== Bibliography ==
- Kozytskyi Vladyslav / A. M. Kozytskyi // Encyclopedia of Modern Ukraine [Online] / Eds. : I. М. Dziuba, A. I. Zhukovsky, M. H. Zhelezniak [et al.] ; National Academy of Sciences of Ukraine, Shevchenko Scientific Society. – Kyiv : The NASU institute of Encyclopedic Research, 2013.
- Ś. p. prof. dr. Władysław Kozicki. „Gazeta Lwowska”, s. 2, Nr 9 z 14 stycznia 1936.
- Jan Draus (2007). Uniwersytet Jana Kazimierza we Lwowie 1918-1946. Portret kresowej uczelni. Kraków: Księgarnia Akademicka. p. 41. ISBN 978-83-7188-964-6.
