= Obertyn =

Rural locality in Ivano-Frankivsk Oblast, Ukraine

Obertyn Обертин
- Rural settlement
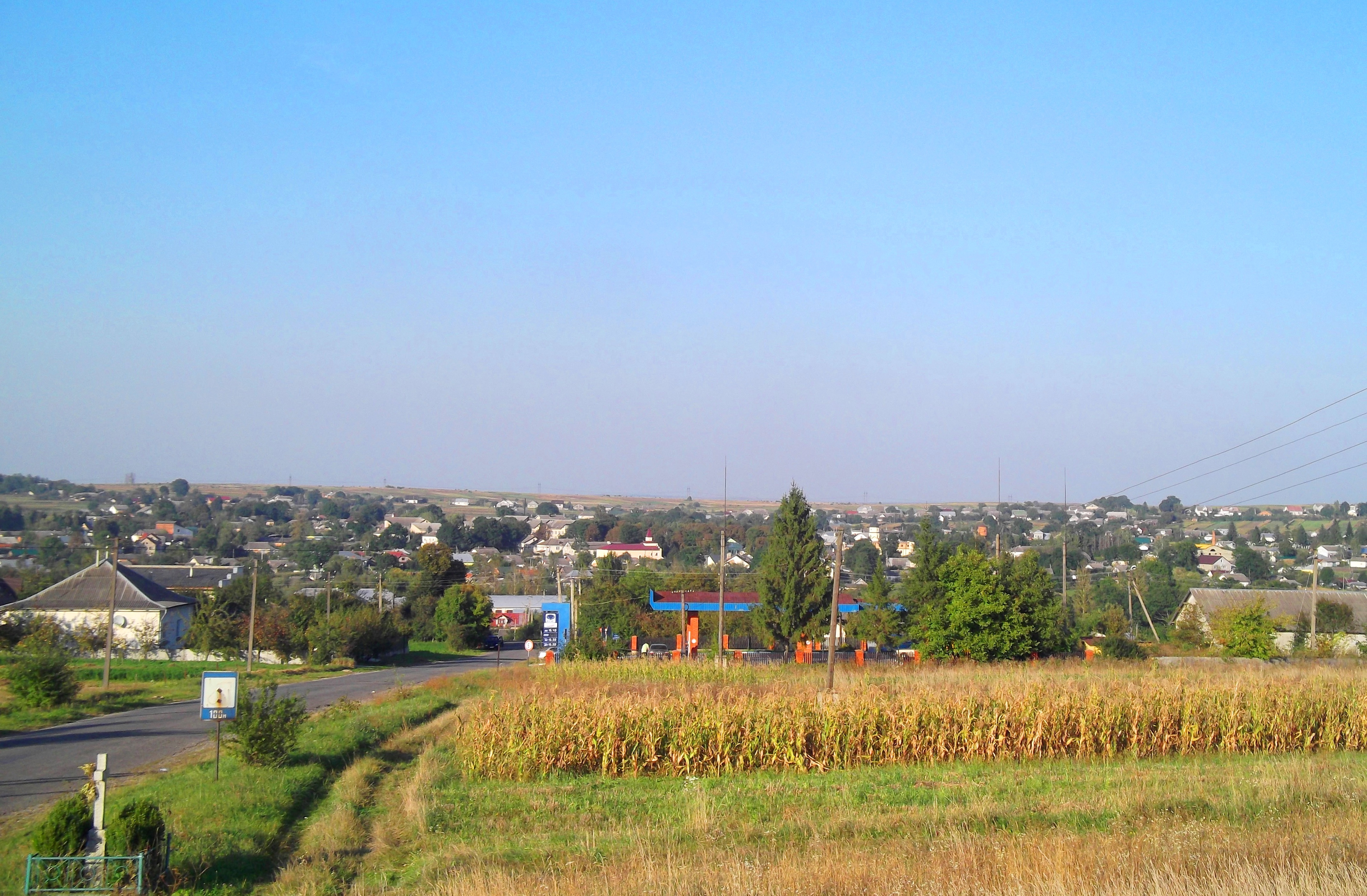

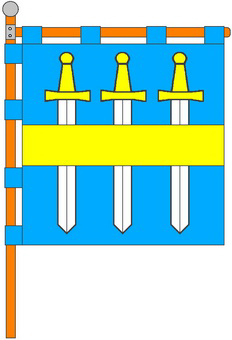
- Flag Coat of arms

- Location within Ivano-Frankivsk Oblast Location within Ukraine
- Coordinates: 48°42′N 25°10′E
- Country: Ukraine
- Oblast: Ivano-Frankivsk Oblast
- Raion: Ivano-Frankivsk Raion
- Hromada: Obertyn settlement hromada

Population (2022)
  - Total: 2,920

Obertyn (Ukrainian: Обертин; Polish: Obertyn; Hebrew: אוברטין; also Obertin) is a rural settlement in Ivano-Frankivsk Raion, Ivano-Frankivsk Oblast, western Ukraine. It hosts the administration of Obertyn settlement hromada, one of the hromadas of Ukraine. Population: 2,920 (2022 estimate).

== History ==
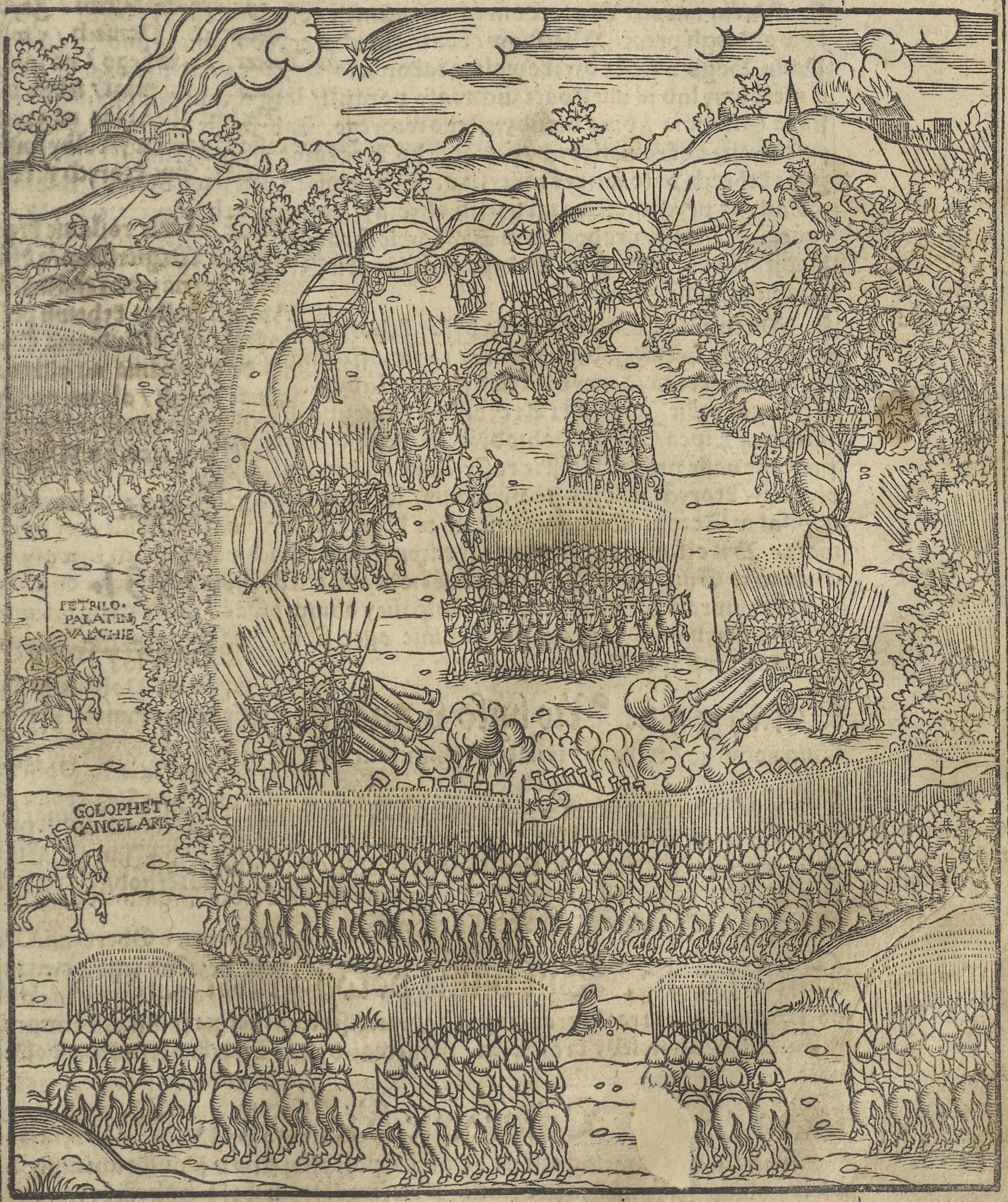
Battle of Obertyn (1531), depicted by Marcin Bielski

The Battle of Obertyn took place here on August 22, 1531, fought between Moldavian Prince Petru Rareş and Polish King Zygmunt Stary. The battle ended with a Polish victory and the reconquest of Pokuttia. It formed part of the Kingdom of Poland until the First Partition of Poland in 1772, when it was annexed by Austria. Obertyn was home to one of the communities of Armenians in Poland.

Following the joint German-Soviet invasion of Poland, which started World War II in September 1939, the town was occupied by the Soviets until 1941, then by Germany until 1944, and then re-occupied by the Soviets in 1944, and eventually annexed from Poland in 1945. The town had an important Jewish community before World War II. In June and September 1942, the Jewish community was moved to a ghetto in Kolomyia and then on to the extermination camp in Bełżec. In 1943, the German occupiers killed nearly all the remaining Jews in Obertyn by shooting them or burning them alive in their houses. Only one Jewish child, Krystyna Carmi, survived the Holocaust.

Until 18 July 2020, Obertyn belonged to Tlumach Raion. The raion was abolished in July 2020 as part of the administrative reform of Ukraine, which reduced the number of raions of Ivano-Frankivsk Oblast to six. The area of Tlumach Raion was merged into Ivano-Frankivsk Raion.

Until 26 January 2024, Obertyn was designated urban-type settlement. On this day, a new law entered into force which abolished this status, and Obertyn became a rural settlement.
