= Panagiotis Poulitsas =

Greek judge and archeologist (1881–1968)

- Παναγιώτης Πουλίτσας
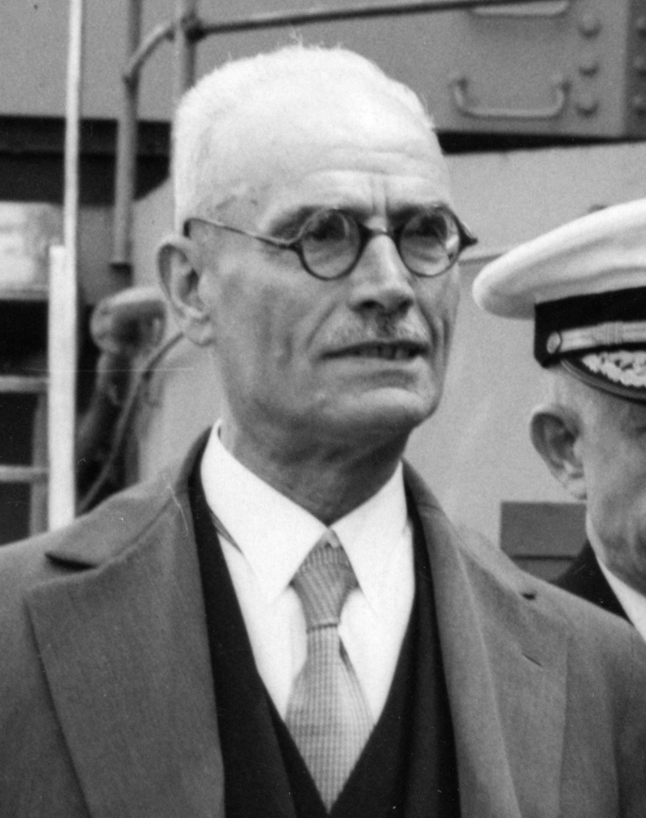
- Panagiotis Poulitsas photographed while USS Missouri was visiting Piraeus, Greece, c. 10–14 April 1946

Prime Minister of Greece
- In office 4 April 1946 – 18 April 1946
- Monarch: George II
- Regent: Archbishop Damaskinos
- Preceded by: Themistoklis Sofoulis
- Succeeded by: Konstantinos Tsaldaris

Personal details
- Born: 9 September 1881 Geraki, Laconia, Greece
- Died: 16 January 1968 (aged 86) Athens, Greece
- Party: Independent
- Relatives: Taki Theodoracopulos (grandson)

Panagiotis Poulitsas (Greek: Παναγιώτης Πουλίτσας; 9 September 1881 – 16 January 1968) was a Greek judge and archeologist who briefly served as interim Prime Minister of Greece from 4 April 1946 to 18 April 1946. He was born in Geraki, Laconia on 9 September 1881.

As President of the Council of State, he took the premiership of an interim government from 4 to 18 April 1946 after the troubled 31 March 1946 elections, which were simultaneous with the reigniting of the Greek Civil War.

In 1947, he became a member of the Archaeological Society of Athens and of the Academy of Athens, of which he was elected president in 1954.

He died in Athens on 16 January 1968 at the age of 86. He was the maternal grandfather of the famous author and playboy Taki Theodoracopulos.

Political offices
Preceded by Themistoklis Sofoulis	Prime Minister of Greece (interim); 4–18 April 1946	Succeeded by Konstantinos Tsaldaris
Legal offices
Preceded by Panagiotis Triantafyllakos	President of the Council of State; 1943–1951	Succeeded by Sotirios Souliotis
