= Tlumach =

Urban locality in Ivano-Frankivsk Oblast, Ukraine

Tlumach Тлумач
- City
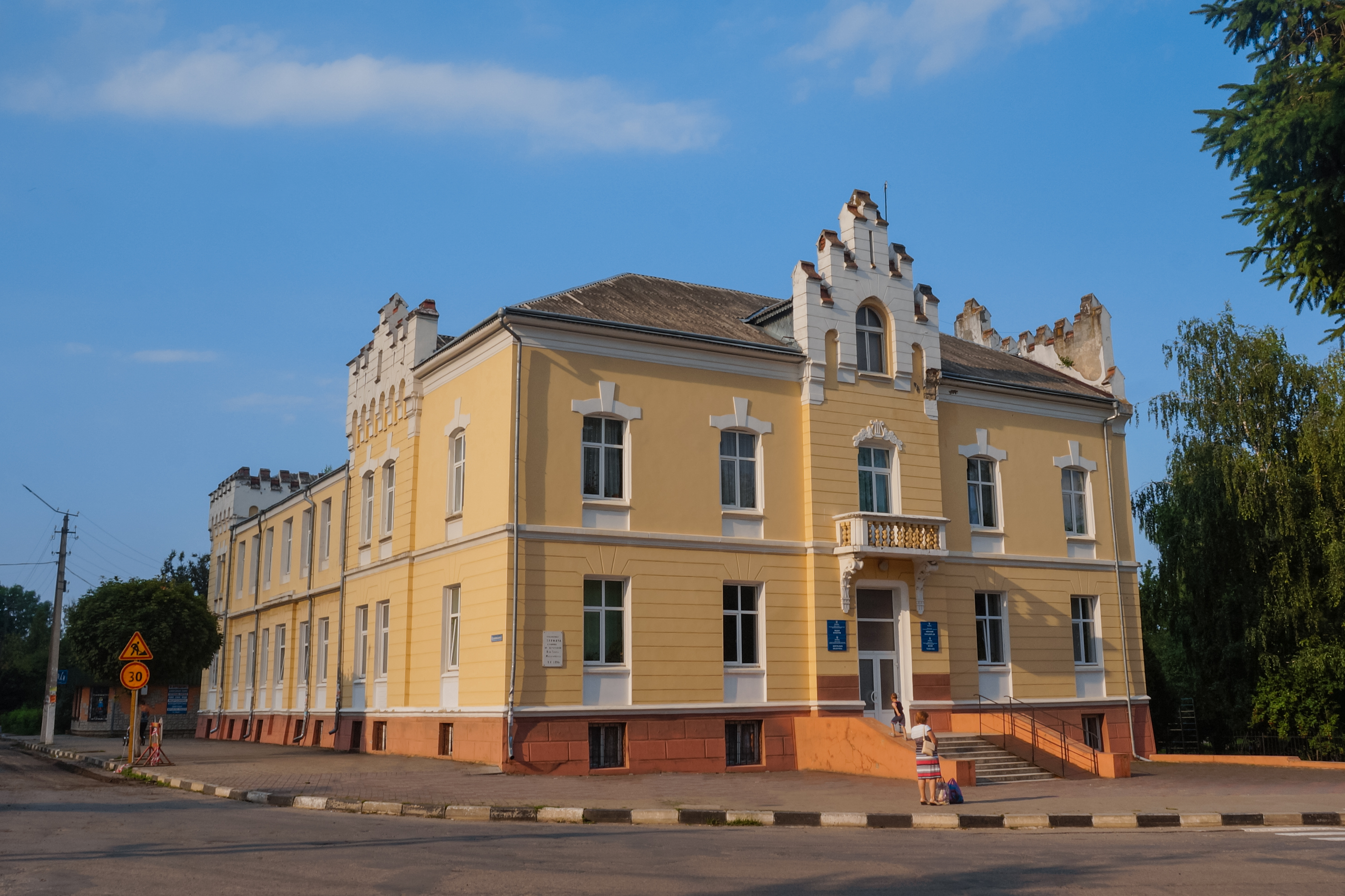
- Building of the "Sokil" society

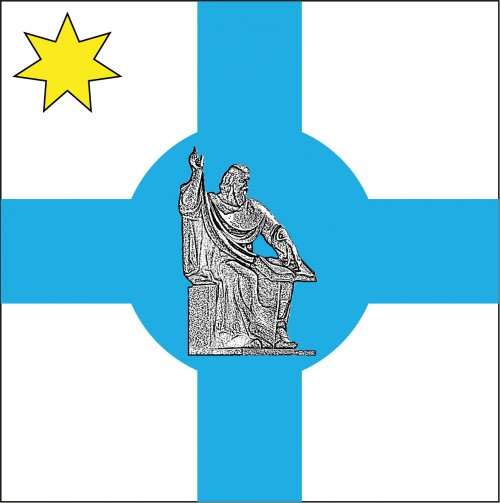
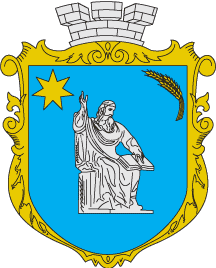
- Flag Coat of arms

- Location of Tlumach within Ukraine Tlumach (Ukraine)
- Coordinates: 48°52′0″N 25°0′0″E
- Country: Ukraine
- Oblast: Ivano-Frankivsk Oblast
- Raion: Ivano-Frankivsk Raion
- Hromada: Tlumach urban hromada

Population (2022)
  - Total: 8,689

Tlumach (Ukrainian: Тлумач, IPA: [ˈtlumɐtʃ]; Polish: Tłumacz; Yiddish: טאַלמיטש, romanized: Talmitsh), also referred to as Tovmach (Ukrainian: Товмач), is a small city in Ivano-Frankivsk Raion, Ivano-Frankivsk Oblast, western Ukraine. It hosts the administration of Tlumach urban hromada, one of the hromadas of Ukraine. Population: 8,689 (2022 estimate). In 2001, its population was around 8,800.

== Name ==
In Polish and Ukrainian, the word means interpreter of the one who explains the meaning of words. Possibly it was named by the White Croats that once inhibited the area.

== History ==
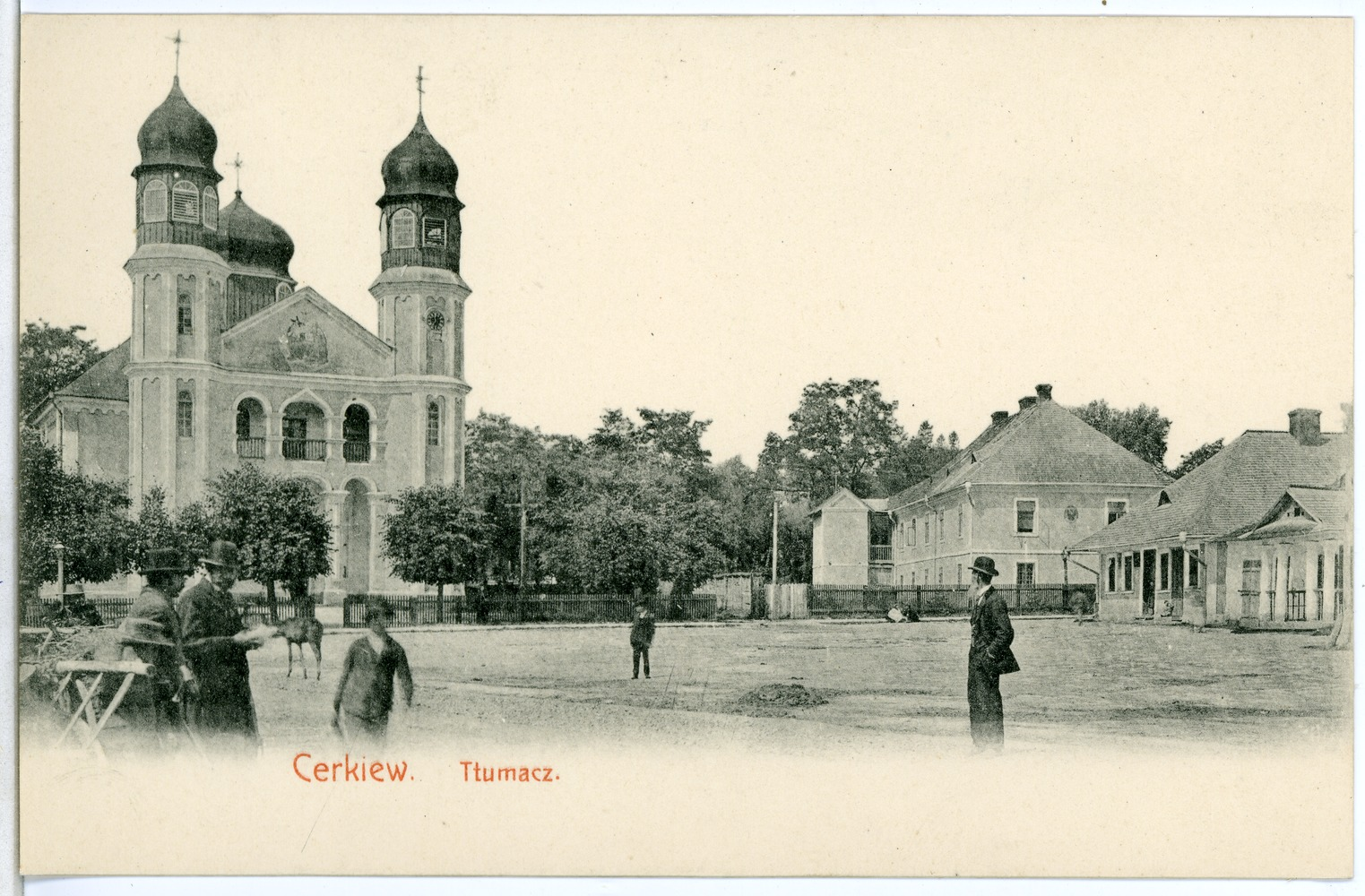
Tłumacz in 1903

From the First Partition of Poland in 1772 until 1918, the town (named Tłumacz) was part of the Austrian monarchy (Austria side after the compromise of 1867), head of the district with the same name, one of the 78 Bezirkshauptmannschaften in Austrian Galicia province (Crown land) in 1900. A post-office was opened in 1858.

Historical population
Year	Pop.	±%
1921	5,788	—
1931	6,836	+18.1%
2022	8,689	+27.1%

After the collapse of Austria-Hungary the town briefly became part of the Western Ukrainian Republic before returning to Poland when Poland repulsed the invading Red Army. The Peace of Riga in 1921, confirmed the Polish possession of Galicia. Tłumacz was the seat of a Powiat (district) in the Second Polish Republic. In 1921, its population was around 5,000, consisting of 3,319 Poles, 1,395 Jews, 999 Ukrainians. The Ukrainians dominated in the villages around the town.

Following the joint German-Soviet invasion of Poland, which started World War II in September 1939, the village was occupied by the Soviet Union until 1941, then by Germany until 1944, and re-occupied by the Soviet Union, which annexed it from Poland in 1945. The Germans, with the assistance of local Ukrainians, murdered the Jews. Only about 30 Jews survived. Poles who survived the war were forced by the Soviets to leave Tlumacz after 1945. Most of them settled in Lower Silesia; they organized themselves into the Association of Inhabitants of Tlumacz, which is located in Wrocław.

Until 18 July 2020, Tlumach was the administrative center of Tlumach Raion. The raion was abolished in July 2020 as part of the administrative reform of Ukraine, which reduced the number of raions of Ivano-Frankivsk Oblast to six. The area of Tlumach Raion was merged into Ivano-Frankivsk Raion.

Local orientation

Regional orientation

== Notable people ==
- Stanislaw Bober – Polish photographer and painter
- Maria Dawska – Polish painter
- Ostap Ortwin – Polish journalist and literary critic
- Shalom Streit – Hebrew-language writer and literary critic
- Jozef Woroszczak – Polish politician
