= Progressive Agricultural Democratic Union =

Progressive Agricultural Democratic Union Προοδευτική Αγροτική Δημοκρατική Ένωσις
- Leader: Alexandros Baltatzis
- Founded: 1958
- Dissolved: 1961
- Preceded by: Liberal Democratic Union
- Merged into: Centre Union
- Ideology: Liberalism; Liberal conservatism Agrarianism; National conservatism
- Political position: Centre

The Progressive Agricultural Democratic Union (Greek: Προοδευτική Αγροτική Δημοκρατική Ένωσις, abbr. ΠΑΔΕ (PADE)) was a coalition of four Greek political parties for the elections of 1958.

Its main leader was Alexandros Baltatzis. Members to the coalition were:

- Peasants and Workers Party
- Progressive Party
- National Progressive Center Union
- Democratic Party of Working People

== See also ==
- List of political parties in Greece
