= Ioannis Theotokis =

Greek politician

- Ιωάννης Θεοτόκης

Prime Minister of Greece
- In office 6 January 1950 – 23 March 1950
- Monarch: Paul
- Preceded by: Alexandros Diomidis
- Succeeded by: Sofoklis Venizelos

Personal details
- Born: 24 September 1880 Athens, Greece
- Died: 6 June 1961 (aged 80) Corfu, Greece
- Party: People's Party
- Parent: Georgios Theotokis (father)

Ioannis Theotokis (Greek: Ιωάννης Θεοτόκης; 24 September 1880 – 6 June 1961) was a Greek politician. He was born in Athens in 1880, son of Georgios Theotokis.

He was elected a member of the Hellenic Parliament seven times and served as Minister for Agriculture three times, before being shortly Prime Minister of a caretaker government in 1950. He died in Corfu in 1961.

Political offices
Preceded by Alexandros Diomidis	Prime Minister of Greece (caretaker); 6 January – 23 March 1950	Succeeded by Sofoklis Venizelos
