= Esther Streit-Wurzel =

Israeli children's book author and educator (1932–2013)

Esther Dickson אסתר שטרייט-וורצל
- Born: Esther Streit; 25 July 1932; Petah Tikva, Central District, Mandatory Palestine
- Died: 7 December 2013 (aged 81); Petah Tikva, Central District, Israel
- Other names: Esther Streit, Zvi Hadas
- Education: Hebrew University of Jerusalem
- Occupations: Children's author, educator
- Years active: 1944–2008
- Spouse: Mordechai Wurzel (1954–2013; her death)
- Children: 3

Esther Streit-Wurzel (Hebrew: אֶסְתֵּר שְטְרייט-ווֹרְצֶל; July 25, 1932, − December 7, 2013) was an Israeli children's author and educator.

Streit-Wurzel was born in Petach Tikva, Central District, in Mandatory Palestine. Her father, Shalom Streit, was an educator who founded Ahad Ha'am Gymnasium in Petach Tikvah. She wrote her first book at age 12, in 1944, under the pen name Zvi Hadas, as she was too shy to credit herself with her work. She graduated from the Hebrew University of Jerusalem in 1952, with a degree in literature and psychology. Apart from writing, she was also an educator.

Esther Streit-Wurzel died following a serious illness on 7 December 2013, aged 81, in Petach Tikva, Central District, Israel. Her funeral took place the next day on 8 December and was attended by thousands.

== Selected works ==
- From the Straits, 1962 (מן המצר)
- Baba's Story, 1964 (סיפורה של בבה)
- Happy New Year to Dana, 1969 (שנה טובה לדנה)
- Boys of the Resistance, 1969 (נערי המחתרת)
- The Escape, 1973/09/14 (הבריחה)
- Uri, 1976 (אורי)
- Adventure in Eilat, 1978 (הרפתקה באילת)
- Aliphim (Freshmen), 1982 (אליפים)
- The Hostage, 1987 (בן הערובה)
- Letters to Tzofia, 1987 (מכתבים לצופיה)
- My Son, Daniel, 1989 (בני דניאל)
- Shahar, 1990 (שחר)
- The Australians / Anna, 1990 (אוסטרלים / אנה)
- The Prayer of the Monk, 1994 (תפילת הנזיר)
- Seven Locks, 1995 (שבעת המנעולים)
- Moments of Light, 1998 (רגעי האור)
- Eddie, King of the Stoners, 1998 (אדי מלך המסטולים)
- Friendship, 2003 (חברות)
- Roey, 2004 (רועי)
- Autobiography: From Ori to Eddit: The Tales of My Books, 1999 (אוטוביוגרפיה: מאורי עד אדי: קורות ספרי)
- Atarot, 2006 (עטרות)
- Two Mothers, 2006 (שתי אמהות)
- Orange Summer, 2008 (קיץ כתום)

=== Books For Toddlers ===
- The Doll from the Little House, 1964 (הבובה מהבית הקטן)
- Happy New Year to Dana, 1969 (שנה טובה לדנה)
- Chiri Biri from Chiriboom Land, 1991 (צ'ירי בירי מארץ צ'יריבום)
