= Olesha rural hromada =

Hromada in Ivano-Frankivsk Oblast, Ukraine

Olesha rural hromada Олешанська сільська громада
- hromada
- Location within Ivano-Frankivsk Oblast Location within Ukraine
- Coordinates: 48°50′11″N 25°08′11″E
- Country: Ukraine
- Oblast: Ivano-Frankivsk Oblast
- Raion: Ivano-Frankivsk Raion
- Administrative center: Olesha

Area
  - Total: 9,251 km^{2} (3,572 sq mi)

Population (2018)
  - Total: 5,652
- Villages: 15
- Website: oleshaotg.gov.ua

Olesha rural hromada (Ukrainian: Олешанська сільська громада) is a hromada in Ukraine, in Ivano-Frankivsk Raion of Ivano-Frankivsk Oblast. The administrative center is the village of Olesha.

== Settlements ==
The hromada consists of 15 villages:

- Budzyn
- Deleva
- Dolyna
- Zhyvachiv
- Isakiv
- Luh
- Mostyshche
- Odaiv
- Ozeriany
- Olesha
- Petriv
- Pidverbtsi
- Sokyrchyn
- Sokolivka
- Sukhodil
