= Olesha, Ivano-Frankivsk Oblast =

Village in Ivano-Frankivsk Oblast, Ukraine

Olesha Олеша
- Village
- Location of Olesha in Ivano-Frankivsk Oblast Location of Olesha in Ukraine
- Coordinates: 48°50′11″N 25°08′11″E
- Country: Ukraine
- Oblast: Ivano-Frankivsk Oblast
- Raion: Ivano-Frankivsk Raion
- First mentioned: 1219

Olesha (Ukrainian: Олеша; German: Olescha; Polish: Olesza) is a village in Ivano-Frankivsk Oblast, Ukraine, in the Ivano-Frankivsk Raion. It is the capital of the Olesha rural hromada.

== History ==
Olesha was first mentioned in 1219 within the Galician–Volhynian Chronicle. Tools have also been found in the village dating back to the late Bronze Age. Its name may possibly be derived from the name Oleh, a theory that is matched by local legend. Residents of Olesha participated in the Khmelnytsky Uprising and the Ukrainian Insurgent Army.

Prior to the Soviet invasion of Poland, Olesha was under the Ukrainian Greek Catholic Church. In the present day, both the UGCC and the Orthodox Church of Ukraine possess churches in the village.
