= Tlumach urban hromada =

Hromada in Ivano-Frankivsk Oblast, Ukraine

Tlumach urban hromada Тлумацька міська громада
- hromada
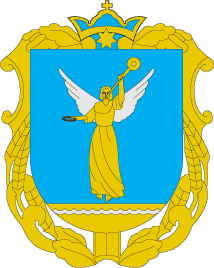
- Seal

- Location within Ivano-Frankivsk Oblast Location within Ukraine
- Coordinates: 48°51′58″N 25°01′14″E
- Country: Ukraine
- Oblast: Ivano-Frankivsk Oblast
- Raion: Ivano-Frankivsk Raion
- Administrative center: Tlumach

Area
  - Total: 18,127 km^{2} (6,999 sq mi)

Population (2018)
  - Total: 18,099
- Sity: 1
- Villages: 34
- Website: tlumacka-gromada.gov.ua

Tlumach urban hromada (Ukrainian: Тлумацька міська громада) is a hromada in Ukraine, in Ivano-Frankivsk Raion of Ivano-Frankivsk Oblast. The administrative center is the city of Tlumach.

== Settlements ==
The hromada consists of 1 city (Tlumach) and 34 villages:

- Antonivka
- Bortnyky
- Bratyshiv
- Bukivna
- Bushkalyk
- Vikniany
- Vilne
- Honcharivka
- Hostiv
- Hrabychanka
- Hrynivtsi
- Hrushka
- Dibrova
- Zahiria
- Zolota Lypa
- Kolintsi
- Korolivka
- Kupeliv
- Kutyshche
- Lysa Hora
- Lokitka
- Melnyky
- Nadorozhna
- Nyzhniv
- Novosilka
- Oleshiv
- Ostrynia
- Palahychi
- Petryliv
- Popeliv
- Prybyliv
- Puzhnyky
- Smerkliv
- Tarasivka
