= C. F. Streit Mfg. Co. =

Furniture maker in Cincinnati, Ohio, US

The C. F. Streit Mfg. Co. was a furniture maker located on Kenner St. in Cincinnati, Ohio. Streit manufactured a number of adjustable furniture pieces, most notably the Slumber Chair which had a combination upholstered seat and back element which could be inclined at various angles. Streit also manufactured a Slumber Davenport with a fold down back which converted to a bed. The Streit Shakespeare Chair was a shallow theater chair with a flip-up upholstered seat.

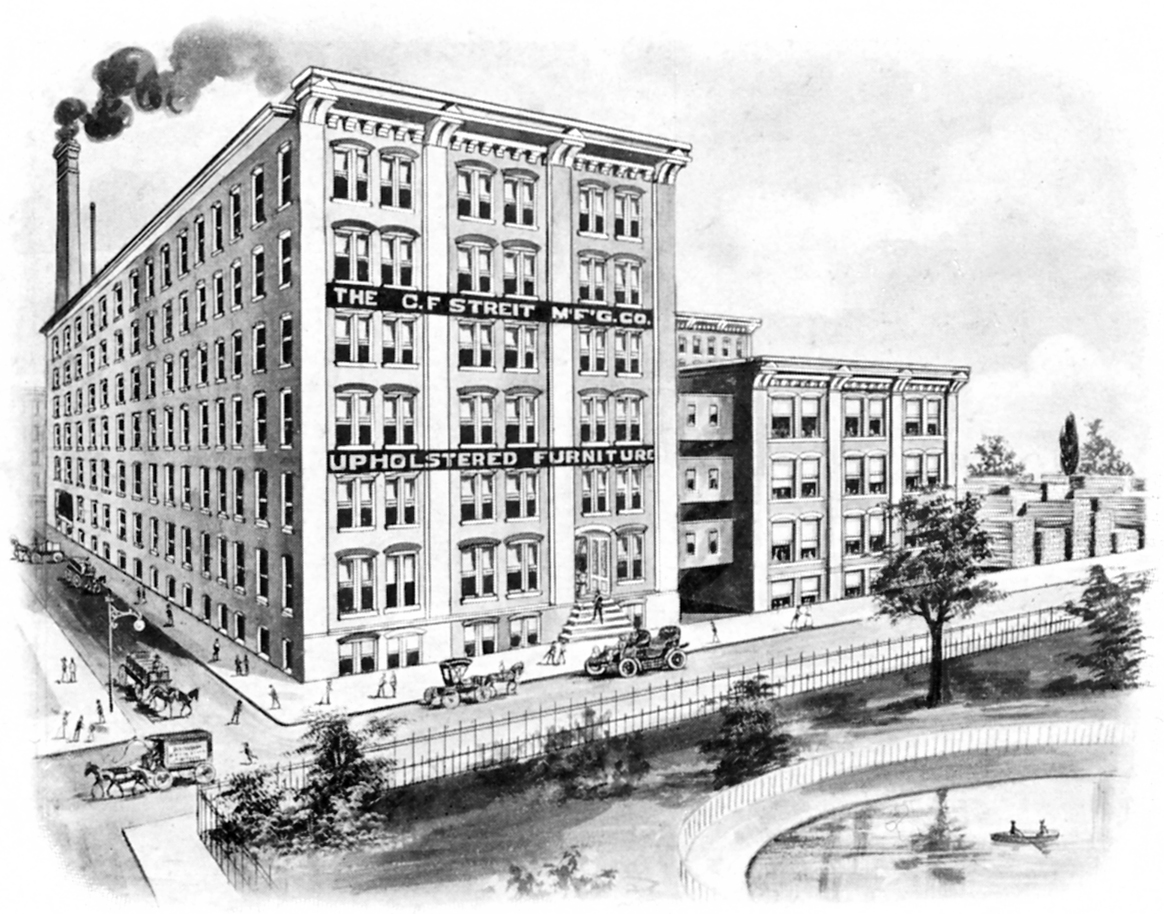
Streit factory about 1907

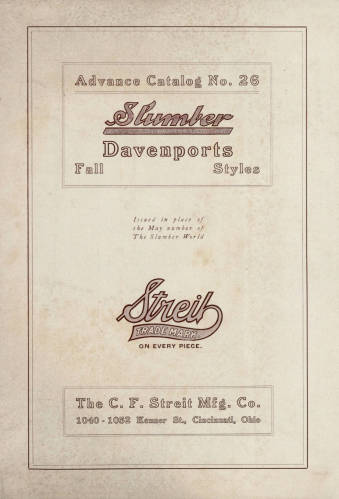
Slumber Davenports - Fall Styles

== Patents ==
- US PAT No. Re 9,046
- US PAT No. Re 9,099, February 14, 1880, Extension Lounge
- US PAT No. 125,767
- US PAT No. 137,505
- US PAT No. 158,869
- US PAT No. 312,927
- US PAT No. 585,366
- US PAT No. 607,293
- US PAT No. 668,268, February 19, 1901, Foot Rest For Chairs
- US PAT No. 693,456
- US PAT No. 994,797
- US PAT No. 1,175,389
- US PAT No. 1,674,846, June 26, 1928, Chair
- US PAT No. 1,720,102, July 9, 1929, Chair
- US PAT No. 1,973,916
- US PAT No. 2,274,506
- US PAT No. 2,325,716, August 13, 1943, Chair
- US PAT No. 2,705,042
- US PAT No. D82,592
- US PAT No. D84,007
