= Shalom Streit =

Shalom Streit (Hebrew: שלום שטרייט; June 5, 1888 – June 23, 1946) was a Hebrew-language educator, literary critic, and writer. Born in Austrian Galicia, in 1908 he emigrated to Ottoman Palestine and spent most of his life there, founding the moshav of Kfar Malal and a high school in Petah Tikva. He taught at the high school, published literary criticism, and hosted literary meetings. His daughter was Esther Streit-Wurzel, a major Israeli young-adult Hebrew novelist.

== Biography ==
Streit was born in 1888 in Tlumach, in eastern Galicia, to Yaakov and Tzviya (née Haber) Streit, who had an older son named Yeshayahu Streit.

Streit received traditional Jewish education in Cheder and Yeshiva, but also took the external state exams.

In 1908, Streit immigrated to Palestine and took up farming. He was among the founders of Kfar Malal (then still called Ein Chai) on land purchased by Zionists from Odesa. He later settled in Petah Tikva, building with his older brother a two-family house for both their families. His home became a frequent meeting place for Second Aliyah writers, as well as a first home for extended family members immigrating to Palestine themselves.

With Baruch Gordon, Streit founded the first high school in Petah Tikva, named after Ahad Ha'am, and was its first principal.

He married Charlotte (Lotte) Goldschläger, and had two children with her: chemist and poet Shmuel Yariv, and major young-adult Hebrew novelist Esther Streit-Wurzel.

In 1946, Streit tripped over a tree root on his way back from synagogue and broke his hip bone. During the subsequent operation in the Yarkon hospital, he suffered a cardiac arrest and died on the operating table, aged 58.

Petah Tikva named a street "The Streit Brothers", after Shalom and Yeshayahu Streit.

== Works ==
- Ba'alot Hashachar (English: "At dawn"), essays, Tel Aviv: Hedim, 1926.
- Pney Hasifrut (English: "The literary landscape"), essays (2 volumes, including a complete republishing of Ba'alot Hashachar), Tel Aviv: Dvir, 1939.

Streit also published criticism and essays in contemporary literary journals like Yitzhak Lamdan's Gilyonot and the Hebrew Writers Association in Israel's Moznayim, as well as in the major daily newspaper Davar. Influenced by his revered friend Yosef Haim Brenner's approach to criticism, Streit avoided aggressive criticism, and practically never emphasized a reviewed writer's weaknesses or shortcomings. This quality of his essays is also praised by fellow Hebrew essayist and critic Yaacov Rabinovich (1875–1948), who described Streit as "intimately sympathetic" to the authors he writes about, and that his reading is "not only with the eyes and the mind, but with all the senses of the body. One feels Streit is practically smelling the text."
