= Alexandros Diomidis =

Greek politician (1875–1950)

- Αλέξανδρος Διομήδης
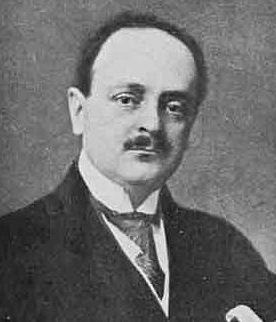

Prime Minister of Greece
- In office 28 June 1949 – 6 January 1950
- Monarch: Paul
- Preceded by: Themistoklis Sofoulis
- Succeeded by: Ioannis Theotokis

Personal details
- Born: 3 January 1875 Athens, Greece
- Died: 11 November 1950 (aged 75) Athens, Greece
- Party: Liberal
- Occupation: Economist

Alexandros Diomidis (Greek: Αλέξανδρος Διομήδης; 3 January 1875 – 11 November 1950) was a governor of the Central Bank of Greece who became Prime Minister of Greece upon the death of Themistoklis Sofoulis.

== Early life ==
Diomidis was born in Athens, Greece, to an Arvanite family from Spetses on 3 January 1875. His grandfather was former prime minister Diomidis Kiriakos. He studied law and economics in Weimar and Paris and earned a doctorate from the University of Berlin. In 1905, he became a professor at the National and Kapodistrian University of Athens. He was a member of the Athens Academy.

== Career in politics ==
Diomidis was appointed prefect ("nomarch") of the Attica and Boeotia Prefecture in 1909. In 1910, he was elected to the Hellenic Parliament under the banner of the Liberal Party. From 1912 to 1915 and again in 1922 he served as minister for finance. Diomedes became governor of the National Bank of Greece in 1923 and governor of the Bank of Greece in 1928.

Diomidis became prime minister upon the death of Sofoulis. It was during his brief term in office (28 June 1949 – 6 January 1950) that the Greek Civil War was concluded. He was forced to resign amid a scandal involving his Minister for Transport, Hatzipanos. He died later in that same year (11 November 1950).

== Personal life ==
Besides being an economist and politician, Diomidis also authored several literary works, including a two-volume work on Byzantine Empire studies.

Along with his wife Julia, Diomidis left part of his fortune to the Greek state for the purposes of establishing a botanical garden in Athens, opened in 1952 as the "Julia and Alexander N. Diomides Botanic Garden".

== Sources ==
Government offices
| Preceded by Themistoklis Sophoulis | Prime Minister of Greece; 28 June 1949 – 6 January 1950 | Succeeded by Ioannis Theotokis |
