= Democratic Union (Greece, 1956) =

Democratic Union Δημοκρατική Ένωσις
- Leader: Georgios Papandreou
- Founded: 1956
- Dissolved: 1957

The Democratic Union (Greek: Δημοκρατική Ένωσις, ΔΕ; DE) was a coalition of seven Greek political parties for the elections of 1956.

The core of the Democratic Union consisted of the Centre parties:

- Liberal Democratic Union, led by Sofoklis Venizelos
- Liberal Party led by Georgios Papandreou
- Peasants and Workers Party (KAE) led by Alexadros Baltatzis
- National Progressive Center Union (EPEK) led by Savas Papapolitis

The left-wing parties had already formed their own electoral alliance named National Movement for Change

- United Democratic Left (EDA) led by Ilias Iliou;
- Democratic Party of Working People led by Alexandros Svolos and Georgios Kartalis;

The Democratic Centre and the National Movement Joined as the "Democratic Union" in January 1956.
