= Georgios Streit =

Greek lawyer, government minister and professor

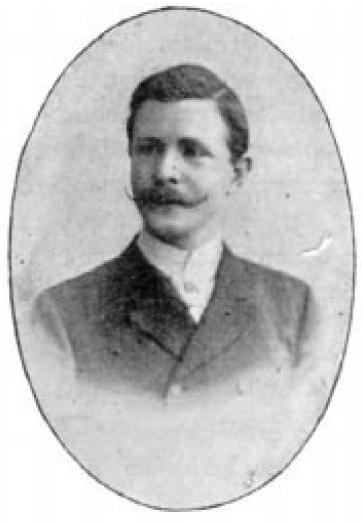
Georgios S. Streit

Georgios Streit (Greek: Γεώργιος Στρέιτ; 1868–1948) was a Greek lawyer and professor. A legal advisor to King Constantine I, Streit was Minister of Foreign Affairs from 1913–14, on the eve of World War I. Later, he served as a Judge at the Permanent Court of Arbitration in the Hague after 1929.

== Early life and family ==
Born in Patras, Greece in 1868, Streit was the son of law professor Stefanos Streit and his wife Victoria Lontou. He was the third generation born in Greece of a German family. He studied law in Athens and Germany and was later on the law faculty of University of Leipzig. In 1898, Streit married Julia Karatheodori.

== Law professor ==
In 1893, Streit was appointed to the faculty of International Law at the University of Athens. During this period, Streit was active in supporting the Greek population in Macedonia, which was still under the hegemony of the Ottoman Empire. He also wrote a number of seminal treatises on International Law in Greek.

== Service in government ==
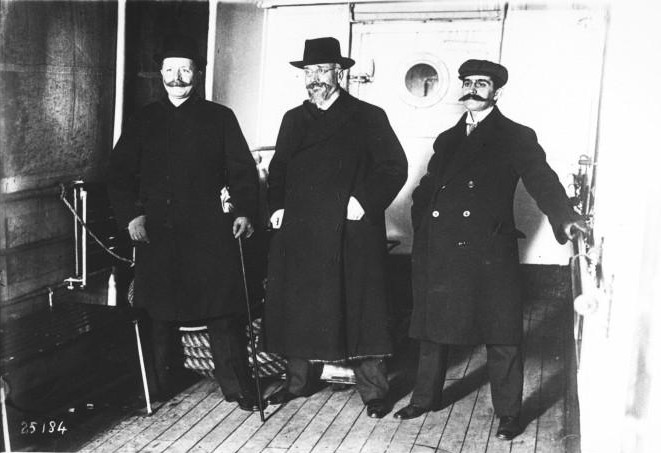
Streit (left) with Eleftherios Venizelos and Nikolaos Politis on ship for the London Conference of 1912–13

In addition to his academic post, Streit also served as an advisor to the Greek Foreign Ministry and in 1910, during the Ministry of Eleftherios Venizelos, he was appointed Greek ambassador to the Austro-Hungarian Empire serving in Vienna. In March 1913, Venizelos appointed Streit as foreign minister, despite his perceived inclination towards the Triple Alliance of Germany, Austria-Hungary and Italy. However, as events unfolded and World War I began to envelop Greece and the Greek National Schism grew, Venizelos began replacing pro-German ministers like Streit. On August 30, 1914 Venizelos succeeded Streit as foreign minister while serving concurrently as prime minister.

== In exile ==
In June 1917, with the government of Venizelos having overcome King Constantine's favored policy of neutrality in World War I and Greece actively joining the war on the side of the Triple Entente, the King abdicated his crown in favor of his second son and left Greece for exile in Switzerland. Streit accompanied the King as his personal secretary and chief advisor. When Constantine was reinstated as king by a plebiscite in December 1920, Streit was not permitted to accompany him. It was presumed that Streit's German heritage was the reason for this. Eventually, Streit returned under an amnesty granted to professors.

== University founder and international jurist ==
After the end of the Greco-Turkish War (1919–1922), an effort to create a major university in Thessaloniki, Greece's second city was realized when Streit, among others helped found the Aristotle University of Thessaloniki.

In 1928, Streit was admitted to the Academy of Athens and 1931, he served as its president.

In 1929, Streit was appointed a judge of the Permanent Court of Arbitration in The Hague. He was reappointed for the last time in 1938.

== Death and memorials ==
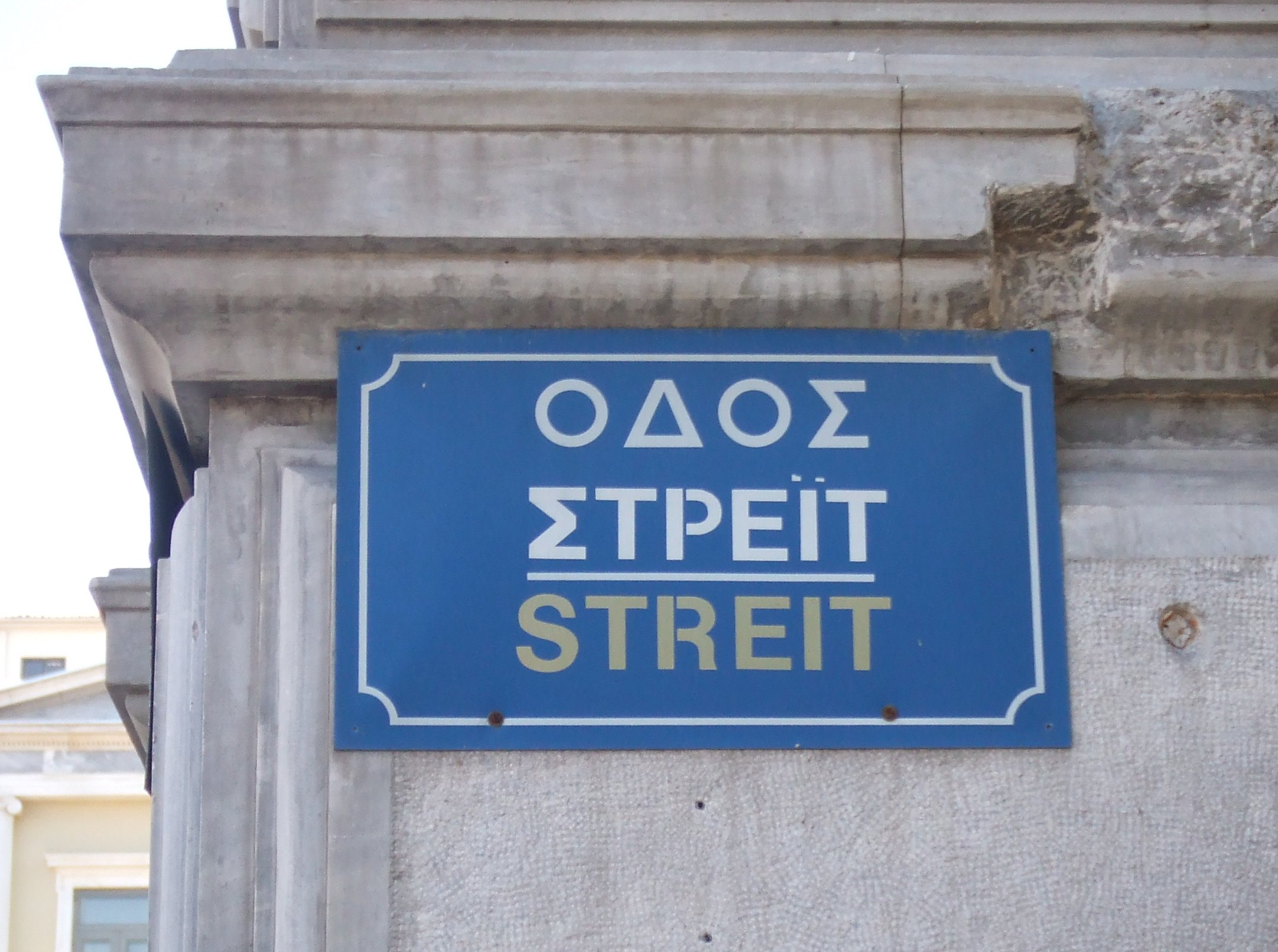
Streit Street in Athens, named after his father Stefanos Streit.

Streit died in 1948 in Athens. His great-grandson is former PASOK MP and Minister of Culture and Tourism Pavlos Geroulanos.
