= Obertyn settlement hromada =

Hromada in Ivano-Frankivsk Oblast, Ukraine

Obertyn settlement hromada Обертинська селищна громада
- hromada
- Location within Ivano-Frankivsk Oblast Location within Ukraine
- Coordinates: 48°41′22″N 25°10′12″E
- Country: Ukraine
- Oblast: Ivano-Frankivsk Oblast
- Raion: Ivano-Frankivsk Raion
- Administrative center: Obertyn

Area
  - Total: 1,623 km^{2} (627 sq mi)

Population (2021)
  - Total: 8,400
- Rural settlement: 1
- Villages: 8
- Website: www.obertynska-tg.gov.ua

Obertyn settlement hromada (Ukrainian: Обертинська селищна громада) is a hromada in Ukraine, in Ivano-Frankivsk Raion of Ivano-Frankivsk Oblast. The administrative center is the rural settlement of Obertyn.

== Settlements ==
The hromada consists of 1 rural settlement (Obertyn) and 8 villages:

- Havryliak
- Harasymiv
- Honchariv
- Zhabokruky
- Zhukiv
- Oleshchyn
- Khotymyr
- Yakivka
