= Stefanos Streit =

Greek jurist, banker and politician

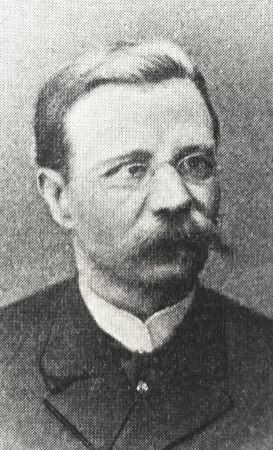
Stefanos Streit

Stefanos Streit (Greek: Στέφανος Στρέιτ; 6 April 1837, in Patras – 13 April 1920, in Athens) was a Greek jurist, banker and politician. He served as chairman of the National Bank of Greece and Minister of Finance.

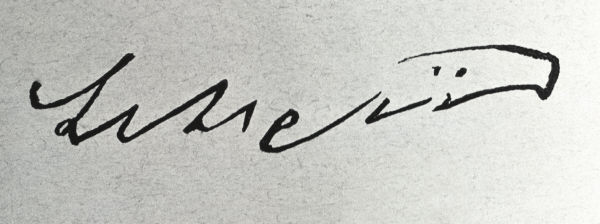
Signature

== Biography ==
He was born on 6 April 1837 in Patras as the son of the German philhellene and military officer Johannes Alexander Streit, who, after his resignation from the army, settled in Patras.

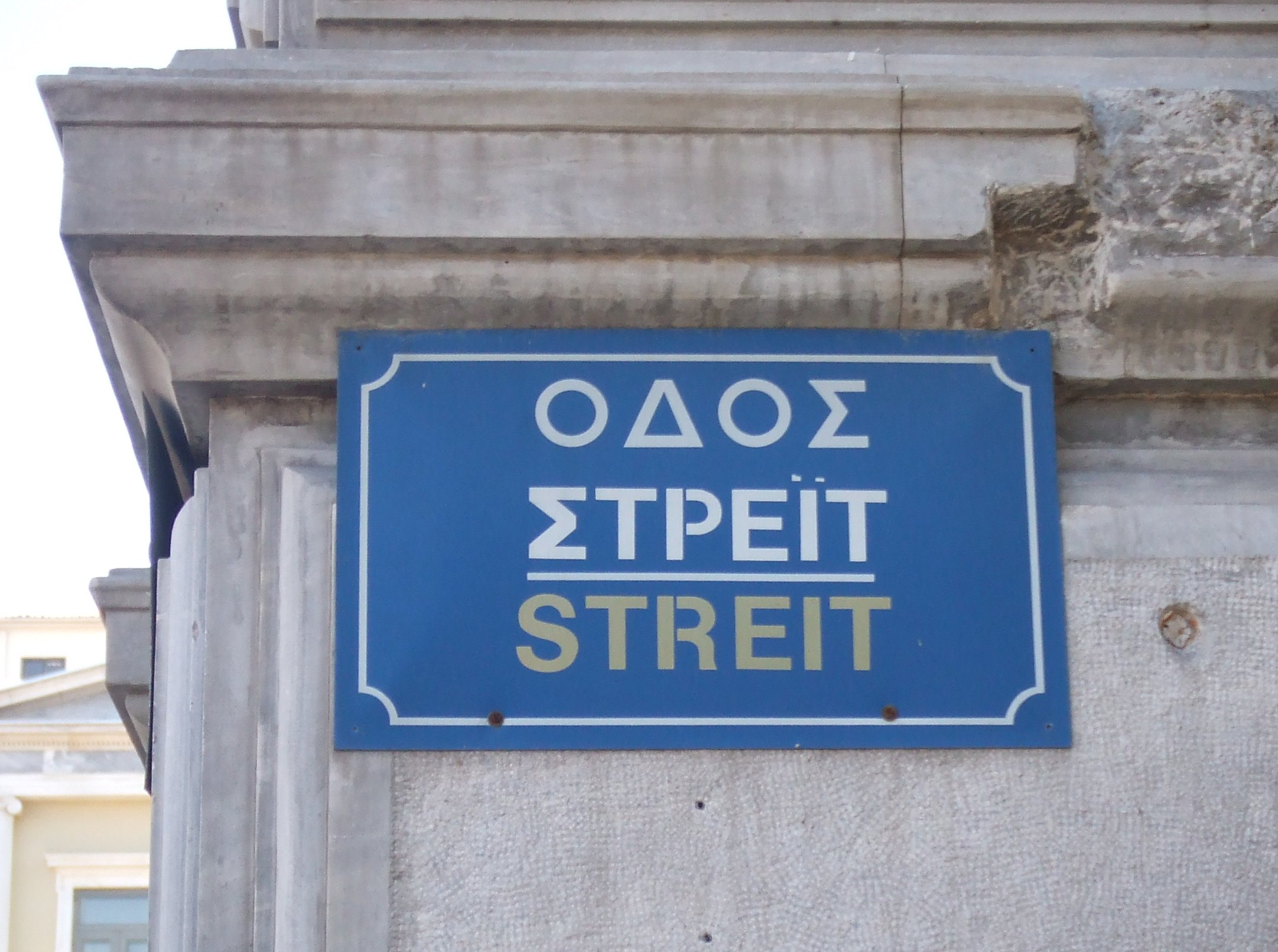
The (Stefanos) Streit Str. name sign in downtown Athens.

After completing his general education in his home town he studied law in Athens and Leipzig and when he returned to Greece in 1861 he was appointed a magistrate. In 1865 he was promoted to the rank of appellate, however the same year he resigned and practised law in Patras until 1872, when he was appointed director of the branch of the National Bank of Greece in Lamia. Later, he was appointed as inspector of the provincial branch of the bank and then he was transferred to the legal department. In 1875, he was nominated lecturer of the University of Athens and the next year he became professor of constitutional and international law. In 1880 he was appointed by the Greek government as its representative in the mission to Munich to settle the debt of the Greek state to Bavaria.

In 1889 he was elected assistant manager of the National Bank, while he was also chairman of the board of the National Insurance and the Corinth Canal Company. In 1896 he became Chairman of the National Bank, a position that he held until 7 December 1910, when he resigned for health reasons.

During his presidency, the activity of the National Bank was extended beyond the borders of Greece with the establishment of the Bank of Crete and the Bank of the East. At the same time the Macedonian Struggle was strengthened and National Defense Treasury loans were issued for the rehabilitation of the Greek refugees coming from Bulgaria and Romania. In 1897 he served as Finance Minister in the government of Alexandros Zaimis. While he was a minister he managed to achieve the settlement of Greece's debts, but also to acquire a new foreign loan. He also served as an advisor to the Ministry of Foreign Affairs.

He died in Athens on 13 April 1920 and his funeral was held at the next day. He was married since 1865 to Victoria Londou, daughter of former mayor of Patras, Andreas Londos. Together they had a son, the politician Georgios Streit.
