= 1958 Greek parliamentary election =

- 11 May 1958

All 300 seats in the Hellenic Parliament 151 seats needed for a majority
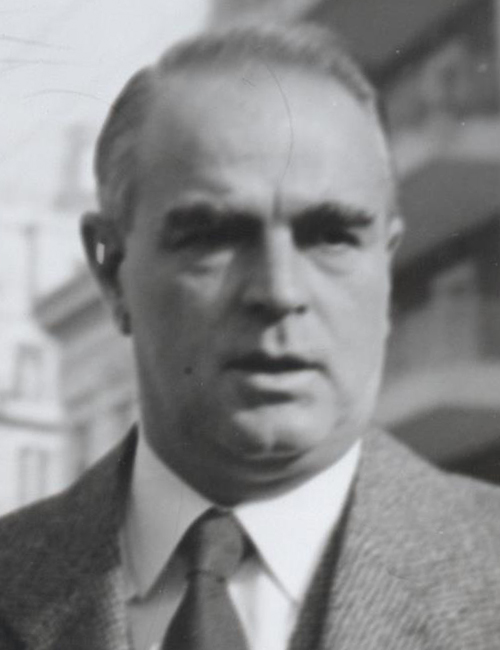

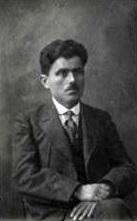

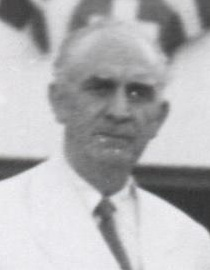

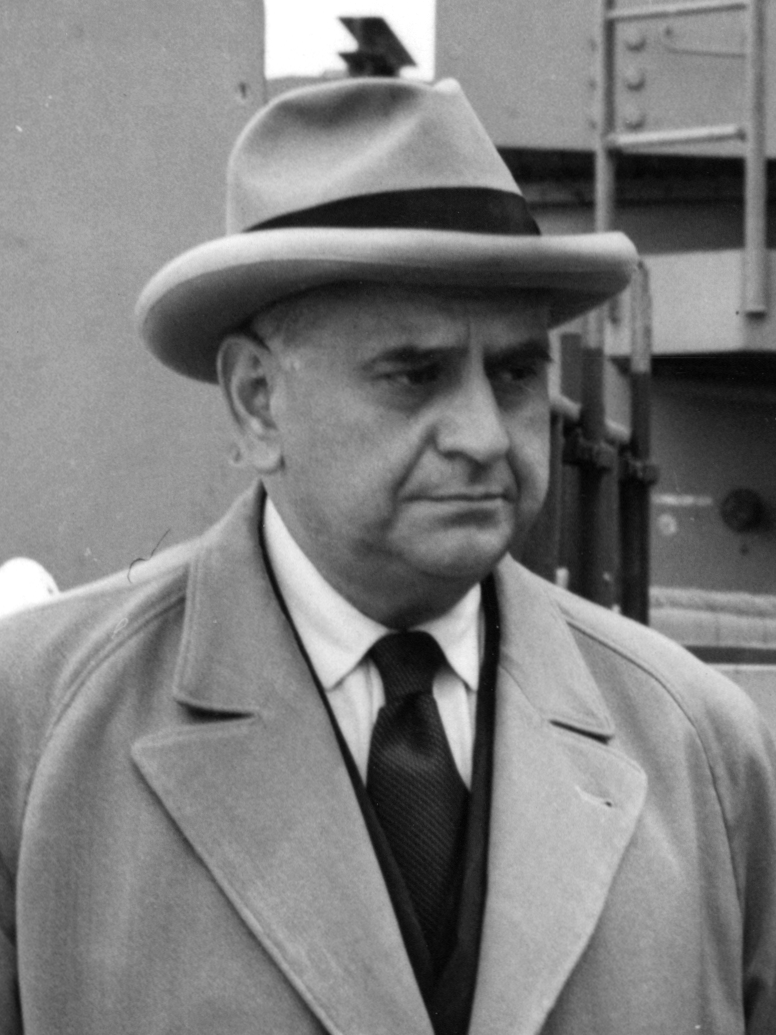
	First party	Second party	Third party
Leader	Konstantinos Karamanlis	Ioannis Passalidis	Georgios Papandreou
Party	ERE	EDA	Liberal
Seats won	171	79	36
Popular vote	1,583,885	939,902	795,445
Percentage	41.16%	24.43%	20.67%
	Fourth party	Fifth party
Leader	Alexandros Baltatzis	Konstantinos Tsaldaris
Party	PADE	ELK
Seats won	10	4
Popular vote	408,787	408,787
Percentage	10.62%	2.95%
Prime Minister before election
Konstantinos Karamanlis
ERE
Prime Minister after election
Konstantinos Karamanlis
ERE

Parliamentary elections were held in Greece on 11 May 1958. The result was a second consecutive victory for Konstantinos Karamanlis and his National Radical Union, which won 171 of the 300 seats in Parliament.

== Background ==
Karamanlis decided to call for early elections, after some of the most prominent members of the National Radical Union defected from the party, including George Rallis and Panagis Papaligouras. Although Karamanlis could have a parliamentary majority, he preferred to go for elections, in order to achieve a renewed public support.

The pretext of the defection was a new electoral law that Karamanlis passed. Rallis was opposed to the law, thinking that it is going to be extremely favorable for the United Democratic Left, a party believed to be linked with the then-banned Communist Party of Greece.

== Results ==
The outcome of the results proved that Rallis' "fears" were justified. The United Democratic Left (EDA) became the second biggest party, defeating a divided centre.

Party	Votes	%	Seats	+/–
National Radical Union	1,583,885	41.16	171	+6
United Democratic Left	939,902	24.43	79	–
Liberal Party	795,445	20.67	36	–
Progressive Agricultural Democratic Union	408,787	10.62	10	New
Union of Popular Parties	113,358	2.95	4	New
List of Independents	4,009	0.10	0	–2
Independents	2,339	0.06	0	–1
Total	3,847,725	100.00	300	0
Valid votes	3,847,725	99.58		
Invalid/blank votes	16,197	0.42		
Total votes	3,863,922	100.00		
Registered voters/turnout	5,119,148	75.48		
Source: Nohlen & Stöver

== Aftermath ==
Just after the elections Karamanlis formed a new government, taking back in his party the defectors.

The unexpected rise of EDA, barely nine years after the end of the Greek Civil War, sent alarms through the right-wing establishment, and measures were taken to combat the emergent "communist threat", including the division of the large urban electoral districts of Athens, Piraeus and Thessaloniki so that the left-voting areas would be separated (forming the Athens B, Piraeus B, etc. constituencies), as well as the establishment of a dedicated domestic security agency, the General Directorate of National Security.
