= 1956 Greek parliamentary election =

- 19 February 1956

All 300 seats in the Hellenic Parliament 151 seats needed for a majority
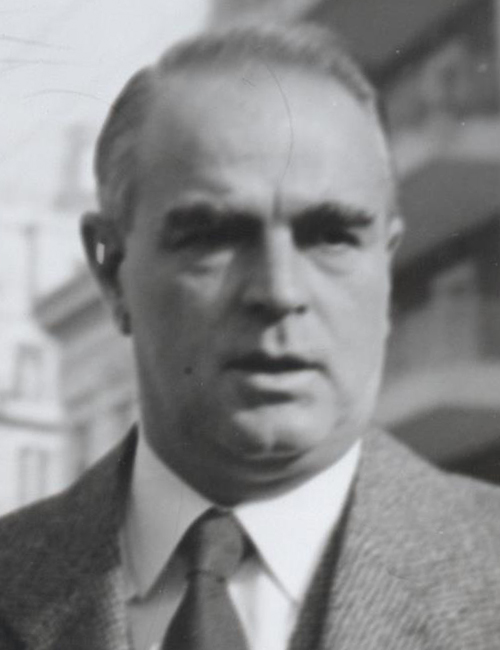

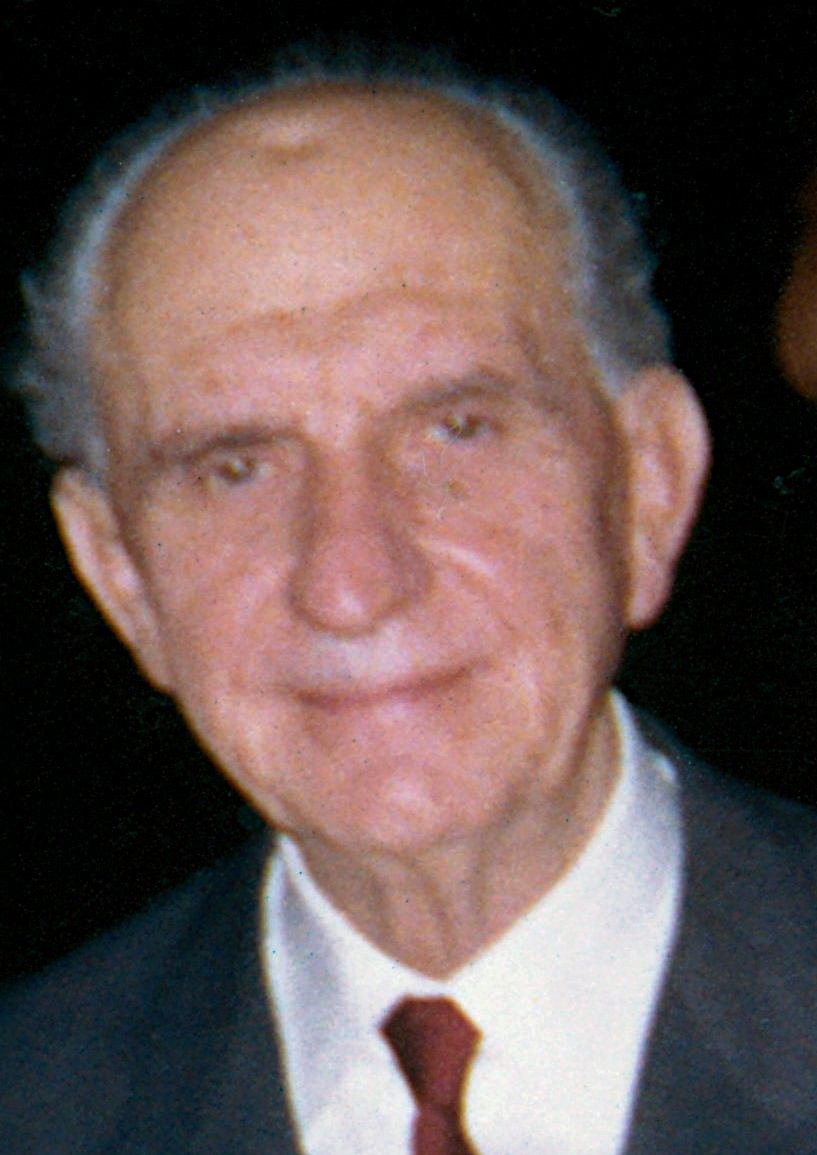
| | First party | Second party |
|---|---|---|
| Leader | Konstantinos Karamanlis | Georgios Papandreou |
| Party | ERE | DE |
| Seats won | 165 | 132 |
| Popular vote | 1,594,112 | 1,620,007 |
| Percentage | 47.38% | 48.15% |
Prime Minister before election
Konstantinos Karamanlis
ERE
Prime Minister after election
Konstantinos Karamanlis
ERE

Parliamentary elections were held in Greece on 19 February 1956. The result was a victory for Konstantinos Karamanlis and his National Radical Union (ERE) by securing the electoral vote despite trailing in the popular vote, due to gerrymandering employed by ERE. It was the first general election in Greece in which women had the right to vote although women had first voted in a by-election in Thessaloniki Prefecture in 1953 in which the first female MP was elected.

Although the Democratic Union, a coalition of centrist parties, received a slim plurality of votes, the conservative governing party, the National Radical Union, won the most seats due to a complex and controversial electoral system enacted by Karamanlis. A "first past the post" system was applied in the rural constituencies where the ERE was expected to gain a plurality, while proportional representation was reserved for the urban constituencies, where the Democratic Union was expected to lead. As a result, the Democratic Union came up 19 seats short of a majority.

The Democratic Union included centrist parties, as the Liberal Democratic Union led by Sophoklis Venizelos and the Liberal Party of Georgios Papandreou, as well as the left-wing EDA, led by Ioannis Passalidis. A few years later, Sophoklis Venizelos and Georgios Papandreou renounced their alliance with EDA, breaking up the Democratic Union.

== Background ==
In 1955, Karamanlis was chosen by the King Paul I as successor of prime minister General Alexandros Papagos, who had just died. The decision was controversial, as Karamanlis was not a leading member of Papagos' party, and caused the vehement reactions of the party's two most prominent members, Stefanos Stefanopoulos and Panagiotis Kanellopoulos.

Nevertheless, Karamanlis, thanks to the support of the royal family and his own dexterous handlings, managed to establish himself as a strong leader. After stabilizing his leadership, he dissolved the Greek Rally party and created his own conservative right-wing party, the National Radical Union, which also comprised some prominent centrists (Evangelos Averoff, Panagiotis Kanellopoulos, Konstantinos Tsatsos) and went on to dominate the Greek political scene for the next 8 years.

== Results ==
| Party | Votes | % | Seats |
|---|---|---|---|
| Democratic Union | 1,620,007 | 48.15 | 132 |
| National Radical Union | 1,594,112 | 47.38 | 165 |
| Progressive Party | 74,545 | 2.22 | 0 |
| List of Independents | 31,022 | 0.92 | 2 |
| Popular Social Party | 29,375 | 0.87 | 0 |
| Christian Democracy | 449 | 0.01 | 0 |
| Independents | 14,851 | 0.44 | 1 |
| Total | 3,364,361 | 100.00 | 300 |
| Valid votes | 3,364,361 | 99.55 | |
| Invalid/blank votes | 15,084 | 0.45 | |
| Total votes | 3,379,445 | 100.00 | |
| Registered voters/turnout | 4,507,907 | 74.97 | |
Source: Ministry of the Interior, Nohlen & Stöver
