= List of heads of state of Greece =

This is a list of the heads of state of the modern Greek state, from its establishment during the Greek War of Independence to the present day.

== First Hellenic Republic (1822–1832) ==
First Hellenic Republic is a historiographical term used by academics to label the earliest iteration of an independent Greek state. Its formal name in English was the Provisional Administration of Greece; it was established at the beginning of the Greek revolution and later renamed the "Hellenic State". There was no distinction between head of state and head of government.

=== Provisional Administration of Greece (Presidents of the Executive, 1822–1827) ===
No.	Head of state		Term of office			Title
No.	Portrait	Name (Birth–Death)	Took office	Left office	Time in office	Title
1		Alexandros Mavrokordatos; Αλέξανδρος Μαυροκορδάτος (1791–1865)	15 January 1822	26 April 1823	1 year, 117 days	President of the Executive
2		Petros Mavromichalis; Πέτρος Μαυρομιχάλης (Πετρόμπεης) (1765–1848)	26 April 1823	5 January 1824	235 days	President of the Executive
3		Georgios Kountouriotis; Γεώργιος Κουντουριώτης (1782–1858)	6 January 1824	17 April 1826	2 years, 101 days	President of the Executive
4		Andreas Zaimis; Ανδρέας Ζαΐμης (1791–1840)	18 April 1826	26 March 1827	353 days	President of the Government Commission
—		Vice-gubernatorial Committee of 1827	3 April 1827	20 January 1828	292 days	

=== Hellenic State (1827–1832) ===
No.	Governor		Term of office			Political affiliation
No.	Portrait	Name (Birth–Death)	Took office	Left office	Time in office	Political affiliation
1		Ioannis Kapodistrias; Ιωάννης Καποδίστριας (1776–1831)	18 January 1828	27 September 1831 o.s. (Assassinated)	3 years, 252 days	Independent
2		Augustinos Kapodistrias; Αυγουστίνος Καποδίστριας (1778–1857)	27 September 1831	28 March 1832 (o.s.) (Resigned)	183 days	Independent
—		Administrative Committee of Greece (1832)	28 March 1832	25 January 1833	303 days	Independent

== Kingdom of Greece (1832–1924) ==
=== House of Wittelsbach (1832–1862) ===
The London Conference of 1832 was an international conference convened to establish a stable government in Greece. Negotiations between the three Great powers (United Kingdom, France and Russia) resulted in the establishment of the Kingdom of Greece under a Bavarian prince. The decisions were ratified in the Treaty of Constantinople later that year.

The convention offered the throne to Prince Otto of Bavaria. They also established the line of succession which would pass the crown to Otto's descendants, or his younger brothers should he have no issue. It was also decided that in no case there would be a personal union of the crowns of Greece and Bavaria. Otto went on to rule Greece until he was exiled in the 23 October 1862 Revolution.

No.	King		Reign			Claim
No.	Portrait	Name (Birth–Death)	Reign start	Reign end	Duration	Claim
1		Otto; Όθων (1815–1867)	7 May 1832	23 October 1862 (o.s.) (Deposed)	30 years, 169 days	Ascended to the throne following the 1832 London Conference

=== House of Glücksburg (1863–1924) ===
In October 1862, King Otto was deposed in a popular revolt, but while the Greek people rejected Otto, they did not seem averse to the concept of monarchy per se. Many Greeks, seeking closer ties to the pre-eminent world power, Great Britain, rallied around the idea that Prince Alfred, the second son of Queen Victoria and Prince Albert, could become the next King. British Foreign Secretary Lord Palmerston believed that the Greeks were "panting for increase in territory", hoping that the election of Alfred as King would also result in the incorporation of the Ionian Islands, which were then a British protectorate, into an enlarged Greek state.

The London Conference of 1832, however, had prohibited any of the Great powers' ruling families from accepting the crown of Greece, and in any event, Queen Victoria was adamantly opposed to the idea. Nevertheless, the Greeks insisted on holding a referendum on the issue of the head of state in November 1862. It was the first referendum ever held in Greece.

Prince Alfred turned down the Kingship and Prince William of Denmark, son of Prince Christian of Denmark, was elected by the National Assembly to become King George I of the Hellenes.

Denotes Regent

No.	King		Reign			Claim
No.	Portrait	Name (Birth–Death)	Reign start	Reign end	Duration	Claim
2		George I Γεώργιος A΄ (1845–1913)	30 March 1863	18 March 1913 (Assassinated)	49 years, 353 days	Ascended to the throne following the 19 November 1862 referendum
3		Constantine I Κωνσταντίνος A΄ (1868–1923)	18 March 1913	11 June 1917 (Abdicated)	4 years, 85 days	Son of George I
4		Alexander; Αλέξανδρος (1893–1920)	11 June 1917	25 October 1920	3 years, 136 days	Second son of Constantine I
—		Admiral Pavlos Kountouriotis; Παύλος Κουντουριώτης (1855–1935)	28 October 1920	17 November 1920 (Resigned)	20 days	Regent
—		Queen Olga; Βασίλισσα Όλγα (1851–1926)	17 November 1920	19 December 1920	32 days	Regent; Widow of George I Mother of Constantine I
(3)		Constantine I Κωνσταντίνος A΄ (1868–1923)	19 December 1920	27 September 1922 (Abdicated)	1 year, 282 days	Restored to the throne following the 22 November 1920 referendum
5		George II; Γεώργιος Β΄ (1890–1947)	27 September 1922	25 March 1924 (Deposed)	1 year, 180 days	Eldest son of Constantine I

== Second Hellenic Republic (1924–1935) ==
The Second Hellenic Republic was a parliamentary republic which was proclaimed on 25 March 1924 and a referendum was held to abolish the Monarchy. The Second Republic was abolished after the 1935 monarchy referendum. The President of the Republic had a symbolic role as head of the state.

Status

Denotes Acting President

No.	President		Elected	Term of office			Political affiliation
No.	Portrait	Name (Birth–Death)	Elected	Took office	Left office	Time in office	Political affiliation
1		Admiral Pavlos Kountouriotis; Παύλος Κουντουριώτης (1855–1935)	1924	25 March 1924	15 March 1926 (Resigned)	1 year, 355 days	Military
2		Lt. General Theodoros Pangalos; Θεόδωρος Πάγκαλος (1878–1952)	—	15 March 1926	18 April 1926	160 days	Military
2		Lt. General Theodoros Pangalos; Θεόδωρος Πάγκαλος (1878–1952)	1926	18 April 1926	22 August 1926 (Deposed)	160 days	Military
(1)		Admiral Pavlos Kountouriotis; Παύλος Κουντουριώτης (1855–1935)	—	22 August 1926	24 August 1926	3 years, 110 days	Military
(1)		Admiral Pavlos Kountouriotis; Παύλος Κουντουριώτης (1855–1935)	—	24 August 1926	10 December 1929 (Resigned)	3 years, 110 days	Military
3		Alexandros Zaimis; Αλέξανδρος Ζαΐμης (1855–1936)	—	10 December 1929	14 December 1929	5 years, 304 days	Independent
3		Alexandros Zaimis; Αλέξανδρος Ζαΐμης (1855–1936)	1929; 1933	14 December 1929	10 October 1935 (Deposed)	5 years, 304 days	Independent

== Kingdom of Greece (1935–1973) ==
=== House of Glücksburg (1935–1973) ===
Denotes Regent

No.	King		Reign			Claim
No.	Portrait	Name (Birth–Death)	Reign start	Reign end	Duration	Claim
—		Lt. General Georgios Kondylis; Γεώργιος Κονδύλης (1878–1936)	10 October 1935	25 November 1935	46 days	Regent (Took power in the 10 October 1935 coup, abolished the republic, and declared himself regent)
(5)		George II; Γεώργιος Β΄ (1890–1947)	25 November 1935	31 December 1944	9 years, 36 days	Restored to the throne following the 3 November 1935 referendum
—		Archbishop Damaskinos; Αρχιεπίσκοπος Δαμασκηνός (1891–1949)	31 December 1944	27 September 1946	1 year, 270 days	Regent (Named regent after the Liberation of Greece, until the conclusion of a referendum on the monarchy)
(5)		George II; Γεώργιος Β΄ (1890–1947)	27 September 1946	1 April 1947	186 days	Restored to the throne following the 1 September 1946 plebiscite on the monarchy
6		Paul; Παύλος (1901–1964)	1 April 1947	6 March 1964	16 years, 340 days	Third son of Constantine I Brother of George II
7		Constantine II; Κωνσταντίνος Β΄ (1940–2023)	6 March 1964	1 June 1973 (Deposed)	9 years, 87 days	Son of Paul
—		Lt. General Georgios Zoitakis; Γεώργιος Ζωιτάκης (1910–1996)	13 December 1967	21 March 1972	4 years, 99 days	Regent; For Constantine II (Appointed by the Greek junta following the failed royal counter-coup of 13 December 1967 and the King's flight to Italy)
—		Colonel Georgios Papadopoulos; Γεώργιος Παπαδόπουλος (1919–1999)	21 March 1972	31 May 1973	1 year, 71 days	Regent; For Constantine II (Strongman of the Greek junta, declared himself regent)

== Republic under the Greek junta (1973–1974) ==
On 1 June 1973 the junta abolished the monarchy and replaced it with a presidential republic. The abolition of the monarchy was approved by a rigged referendum held on 29 July 1973.

No.	President		Term of office			Political affiliation
No.	Portrait	Name (Birth–Death)	Took office	Left office	Time in office	Political affiliation
1		Colonel Georgios Papadopoulos; Γεώργιος Παπαδόπουλος (1919–1999)	1 June 1973	25 November 1973 (Deposed)	177 days	Military
2		General Phaedon Gizikis; Φαίδων Γκιζίκης (1917–1999)	25 November 1973	24 July 1974	241 days	Military

== Third Hellenic Republic (1974–present) ==
On 24 July 1974, the junta was overthrown and democracy restored. A second referendum, held on 8 December 1974, confirmed the abolition of the monarchy and the establishment of the current parliamentary republic, with the President of the Republic in a symbolic role as head of the state.

Status

Denotes Acting President

No.	President		Elected	Term of office			Political affiliation
No.	Portrait	Name (Birth–Death)	Elected	Took office	Left office	Time in office	Political affiliation
—		General Phaedon Gizikis; Φαίδων Γκιζίκης (1917–1999)	— (Remained in office pro tempore)	24 July 1974	18 December 1974	147 days	Military
1		Michail Stasinopoulos; Μιχαήλ Στασινόπουλος (1903–2002)	1974 (Interim)	18 December 1974	19 July 1975	213 days	New Democracy
2		Konstantinos Tsatsos; Κωνσταντίνος Τσάτσος (1899–1987)	1975	19 July 1975	10 May 1980	4 years, 296 days	New Democracy
3		Konstantinos Karamanlis; Κωνσταντίνος Καραμανλής (1907–1998)	1980	10 May 1980	10 March 1985 (Resigned)	4 years, 304 days	New Democracy
—		Ioannis Alevras; Ιωάννης Αλευράς (1912–1995)	— (Acting)	10 March 1985	30 March 1985	20 days	PASOK
4		Christos Sartzetakis; Χρήστος Σαρτζετάκης (1929–2022)	1985	30 March 1985	5 May 1990	5 years, 36 days	Independent
(3)		Konstantinos Karamanlis; Κωνσταντίνος Καραμανλής (1907–1998)	1990	5 May 1990	10 March 1995	4 years, 310 days	New Democracy
5		Konstantinos Stephanopoulos; Κωνσταντίνος Στεφανόπουλος (1926–2016)	1995; 2000	10 March 1995	12 March 2005	10 years, 2 days	Independent
6		Karolos Papoulias; Κάρολος Παπούλιας (1929–2021)	2005; 2010	12 March 2005	13 March 2015	10 years, 1 day	PASOK
7		Prokopis Pavlopoulos; Προκόπης Παυλόπουλος (born 1950)	2014–15	13 March 2015	13 March 2020	5 years	New Democracy
8		Katerina Sakellaropoulou; Κατερίνα Σακελλαροπούλου (born 1956)	2020	13 March 2020	13 March 2025	5 years	Independent
9		Konstantinos Tasoulas; Κωνσταντίνος Τασούλας (born 1959)	2025	13 March 2025	Incumbent	1 year, 251 days	New Democracy

== Head of state titles ==
State	Years	Title
First Hellenic Republic	1827–1832	Governor
Kingdom of Greece (Under Wittelsbach dynasty)	1832–1862	King of Greece
Kingdom of Greece (Under Glücksburg dynasty)	1863–1924	King of the Hellenes
Second Hellenic Republic	1924	Governor
Second Hellenic Republic	1924–1935	President of the Republic
Kingdom of Greece (Restored Glücksburg dynasty)	1935–1973	King of the Hellenes
Hellenic Republic (Military Junta)	1973–1974	President of the Republic
Third Hellenic Republic	1974–present	President of the Republic

== See also ==
- Politics of Greece
- List of kings of Greece
- List of regents of Greece
- List of prime ministers of Greece
- List of cabinets of Greece
