= 1974 Greek presidential election =

- 18 December 1974
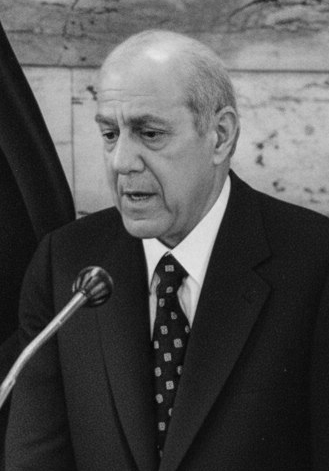
Nominee	Michail Stasinopoulos
Party	Non-political (supported by New Democracy)
President before election
Gen. Phaedon Gizikis
Military, appointed by the military junta
President
Michail Stasinopoulos
Non-political

An indirect election for the position of President of the Hellenic Republic was held by the Hellenic Parliament on 18 December 1974.

Following the restoration of democracy in Greece, the 17 November 1974 election, and the abolition of the Greek monarchy in the 8 December 1974 referendum, distinguished jurist and former president of the Council of State Michail Stasinopoulos was elected as the first, President of the Third Hellenic Republic on 18 December with 206 votes. He served as a provisional president until July 1975, when, following the promulgation of a new constitution Konstantinos Tsatsos replaced him as the first "regular" President with a full five-year term.
