= Third Hellenic Republic =

Current state of Greece, established after the fall of the Military Junta in 1974

Hellenic Republic Ελληνική Δημοκρατία (Greek) Ellinikí Dimokratía
- 1974–present
- Top: Flag (1975–1978); Bottom: Flag (1978–present) Coat of Arms (1975–present)
- Motto: "Eleftheria i thanatos" Ελευθερία ή θάνατος "Freedom or Death"
- Anthem: «Ύμνος εις την Ελευθερίαν» Ýmnos eis tin Eleftherían "Hymn to Liberty"
- Location of Third Hellenic Republic (dark green) – in Europe (green & dark grey) – in the European Union (green) – [Legend]
- Capital and largest city: Athens; 37°58′N 23°43′E
- Official language: Greek
- Religion: Greek Orthodoxy
- Demonym: Greeks, Hellenes
- Government: Unitary parliamentary republic (from 1975)
- President
  - Jul–Dec 1974: Phaedon Gizikis (First during the Democratic Transition)
  - 1974–1975: Michail Stasinopoulos (First after the Democratic Transition)
  - 1975–1980: Konstantinos Tsatsos
  - 1980–1985: Konstantinos Karamanlis
  - 10 Mar–30 Mar 1985: Ioannis Alevras (acting)
  - 1985–1990: Christos Sartzetakis
  - 1990–1995: Konstantinos Karamanlis
  - 1995–2005: Konstantinos Stephanopoulos
  - 2005–2015: Karolos Papoulias
  - 2015–2020: Prokopis Pavlopoulos
  - 2020–2025: Katerina Sakellaropoulou
  - 2025–present: Konstantinos Tasoulas
- Prime Minister
  - 1974–1980: Konstantinos G. Karamanlis (first)
  - 2019–May 2023, Jun 2023–present: Kyriakos Mitsotakis (current)
- Legislature: Hellenic Parliament

Establishment
  - Independence declared from the Ottoman Empire: 25 March 1821 (traditional starting date of the Greek War of Independence), 15 January 1822 (official declaration)
  - Recognised: 3 February 1830
  - Established: 24 July 1974
  - Current constitution: 11 June 1975

Area
  - Total: 131,957 km^{2} (50,949 sq mi) (95th)
  - Water (%): 0.8669

Population
  - 2017 estimate: 10,768,477
  - 2011 census: 10,816,286 (80th)
  - Density: 82/km^{2} (212.4/sq mi) (125th)
- GDP (PPP): 2019 estimate
  - Total: $326.700 billion (57th)
  - Per capita: $30,522 (47th)
- GDP (nominal): 2019 estimate
  - Total: $224.033 billion (52nd)
  - Per capita: $20,930 (38th)
- Gini (2018): ▼32.3 medium inequality (60th)
- HDI (2019): ▲0.888 very high (32nd)
- Currency: Euro (€) (since 2001); Modern drachma (until 2001) (EUR (since 2001), GRD (until 2001))
- Time zone: UTC+02:00 (Eastern European Time)
  - Summer (DST): UTC+03:00 (Eastern European Summer Time)
- Date format: dd/mm/yyyy (AD)
- Calling code: +30
- ISO 3166 code: GR
- Internet TLD: .gr^{a}.ελ
- 1. The .eu domain is also used, as in other European Union member states.

The Third Hellenic Republic (Greek: Γ΄ Ελληνική Δημοκρατία, romanized: Triti Elliniki Dimokratia) is the period in modern Greek history that stretches from 1974, with the fall of the Greek military junta and the final confirmation of the abolition of the Greek monarchy, to the present day. Today, it is the current government of Greece.

It is considered the third period of republican rule in Greece, following the First Republic during the Greek War of Independence (1821–1832) and the Second Republic during the temporary abolition of the monarchy in 1924–1935.

The term metapolitefsi (μεταπολίτευση, polity change) is commonly used for the entire period, but when used more strictly, this term refers to the early part of the period, beginning with the fall of the junta and culminating in the democratic transformation of the country. While the First and Second Hellenic Republics are not in common use except in a historiographic context, the term Third Hellenic Republic is used frequently.

The Third Hellenic Republic has been characterised by the development of social freedoms and the European orientation of Greece. Greece became the tenth member of the European Communities in 1981, ushering in sustained growth. Investments in industrial enterprises and heavy infrastructure, as well as funds from the European Union and growing revenue from tourism, shipping, and a fast-growing service sector raised the standard of living, a trend which reached its zenith around the time of the 2004 Summer Olympics to the Eurovision Song Contest 2006. The country adopted the euro in 2001 and successfully hosted the 2004 Summer Olympic Games in Athens. In 2010, Greece suffered from the Great Recession and related European sovereign debt crisis. The crisis ended around 2018, with the end of the bailout mechanisms and return of growth. Politically, the parties ND and PASOK have been dominant, although PASOK declined from the 2010s to the early 2020s, being replaced by Syriza as the largest party of the left. Since Alexis Tsipras left the leadership of Syriza, PASOK has regained influence alongside Tsipras' new party ELAS as the dominant opposition parties.

== Events ==
The former prime minister Konstantinos Karamanlis was invited back from self-exile and the first multiparty elections since 1964 were held on the first anniversary of the Polytechnic uprising. A democratic and republican constitution was promulgated in 1975 following a referendum which chose not to restore the monarchy. Meanwhile, Andreas Papandreou, George Papandreou's son, founded the Panhellenic Socialist Movement (PASOK) in response to Karamanlis's conservative New Democracy party, with the two political formations dominating government over the next four decades. Greece rejoined NATO in 1980. (Note: On 14 August 1974 Greek forces withdrew from the integrated military structure of NATO in protest at the Turkish occupation of northern Cyprus; Greece rejoined NATO in 1980.)

Greece became the tenth member of the European Communities in 1981, ushering in sustained growth. Investments in industrial enterprises and heavy infrastructure, as well as funds from the European Union and growing revenue from tourism, shipping, and a fast-growing service sector raised the standard of living. In 1981, Andreas Papandreou came to power and implemented an ambitious program of social reforms. He recognised civil marriage, the dowry was abolished, while expanding access to education and health care. However, he made controversial foreign policy decisions that fueled the rise of terrorism in Greece. Papandreou's tenure has been associated with corruption (see Koskotas and Yugoslav corn scandals), the first constitutional crisis of the new republic, and economic policies failed to address the persistent stagflation and chronic budget deficits that exacerbated Greece's economic problems.

The 1990s saw the standard of living among Greeks steadily increase, a trend which reached its zenith around the time of the 2004 Summer Olympics to the Eurovision Song Contest 2006. The country adopted the euro in 2001 and successfully hosted the 2004 Summer Olympic Games in Athens.

In 2010, Greece suffered from the Great Recession and related European sovereign debt crisis. The causes of the crisis in Greece have been attributed to a failure of PASOK and ND to fully adopt democratic practices after the end of the monarchy and a failure to modernize their structure. Due to the adoption of the euro, Greece could no longer devalue its currency to regain competitiveness. The Greek debt crisis brought about great changes on both a social and political level, and the two main political parties, PASOK and New Democracy, collapsed during the 2012 elections. In 2015, Alexis Tsipras was elected as prime minister, the first outside the two main parties. The Greek government-debt crisis, and subsequent austerity policies, resulted in social strife. The crisis ended around 2018, with the end of the bailout mechanisms and return of growth. Simultaneously, Tsipras, and the leader of North Macedonia, Zoran Zaev, signed the Prespa Agreement, solving the naming dispute that had strained the relations and eased the latter's way to become a member of the EU and NATO.

In 2019, Kyriakos Mitsotakis became Greece's new prime minister, after his centre-right New Democracy won the election. The COVID-19 pandemic caused economic hardship for Greece. In 2020, Greece's parliament elected a non-partisan candidate, Katerina Sakellaropoulou, as the first female President of Greece. In February 2024, Greece became the first Orthodox Christian country to recognise same-sex marriage and adoption by same-sex couples.

In 2023, Greece became a member of the Three Seas Initiative.

== Presidents of the Third Hellenic Republic ==
- Michail Stasinopoulos (1974–1975)
- Konstantinos Tsatsos (1975–1980)
- Konstantinos Karamanlis (1980–1985)
- Ioannis Alevras (1985) (Acting)
- Christos Sartzetakis (1985–1990)
- Konstantinos Karamanlis (1990–1995)
- Konstantinos Stephanopoulos (1995–2005)
- Karolos Papoulias (2005–2015)
- Prokopis Pavlopoulos (2015–2020)
- Katerina Sakellaropoulou (2020–2025)
- Konstantinos Tasoulas (2025–present)

== Political parties in Third Hellenic Republic ==
=== 1974–1989 ===
This period began with the centrists and centre-right being dominant, though the former lost support in the late 1970s with the rise of the Panhellenic Socialist Movement. Also the Communist Party of Greece was allowed to take part in elections for first time after the end of the Greek Civil War. The table below shows the results of elections during this period.

Political position/ Ideology	Political Party	1974 Legislative Elections	1977 Legislative Elections	1981 Legislative Elections	1981; European; Elections	1984; European; Elections	1985 Legislative Elections	1989; European; Elections	1989 June Legislative Elections	1989 Nov Legislative Elections
Political position/ Ideology	Political Party	%	%	%	%	%	%	%	%	%
Far-left	KKE	–	9.36	10.93	12.84	11.64	9.89	–	–	–
Far-left	KKE interior	–	–	1.37	5.30	3.42	1.84	–	–	–
Left-wing	United Left	9.47	–	–	–	–	–	–	–	–
Left-wing	SPADE	–	2.72	–	–	–	–	–	–	–
Left-wing	SYN	–	–	–	–	–	–	14.31	13.13	10.97
Centre-left	PASOK	13.58	25.34	48.06	40.12	41.58	45.82	35.96	39.13	40.97
Ecologists	Alternative Ecologists	–	–	–	–	–	–	1.11	–	0.58
Centre	Centre union	20.42	–	–	–	–	–	–	–	–
Centre	EDIK	–	11.95	0.40	1.12	0.28	–	0.28	–	–
Centre	KODISO	–	–	0.72	4.26	0.80	–	–	–	–
Centre	Liberal Party	–	–	0.37	1.04	0.35	0.17	0.40	0.10	0.08
Centre	Christian Democracy	–	–	0.15	1.12	0.45	–	0.41	0.20	–
Liberals	New Liberals	–	1.08	–	–	–	–	–	–	–
Centre-right	New Democracy	54.37	41.84	35.88	31.34	38.05	40.85	40.41	44.28	46.19
Centre-right	DIANA	–	–	–	–	–	–	1.36	1.01	–
Right-wing	EDE	1.08	–	–	–	–	–	–	–	–
Right-wing	National Alignment	–	6.82	–	–	–	–	–	–	–
Right-wing	Progressive Party	–	–	1.69	1.96	–	–	–	–	–
Far-right	EPEN	–	–	–	–	2.29	0.60	1.16	0.30	–

=== 1990–2007 ===
This period began with the fall of communist regimes in eastern Europe. It is characterized by the reinforcement of bipartisanship with the two main parties (New Democracy and PASOK) regularly polling over 80% of the vote between them, even reaching 86%.

Political position/ Ideology	Political Party	1990 Legislative Elections	1993 Legislative Elections	1994; European; Elections	1996 Legislative Elections	1999; European; Elections	2000 Legislative Elections	2004 Legislative Elections	2004; European; Elections	2007 Legislative Elections
Political position/ Ideology	Political Party	%	%	%	%	%	%	%	%	%
Far-left	KKE	–	4.54	6.29	5.61	8.67	5.52	5.90	9.48	8.15
Left-wing	SYN/SYRIZA	10.28	2.94	6.25	5.12	5.16	3.20	3.26	4.16	5.04
Centre-left	PASOK	38.61	46.88	37.64	41.49	32.91	43.79	40.55	34.03	38.10
Centre-left	DIKKI	–	–	–	4.43	6.85	2.69	1.79	–	–
Ecologists	Alternative Ecologists	0.77	–	–	–	–	–	–	–	–
Ecologists	Ecologist Greens	–	–	–	–	–	–	–	0.67	1.05
Centre	Union of Centrists	–	0.23	1.19	0.70	0.82	0.34	0.26	0.56	0.29
Liberals	The Liberals	–	–	–	–	1.62	–	–	–	–
Centre-right	New Democracy	46.89	39.30	32.66	38.12	36.00	42.74	45.36	43.02	41.84
Centre-right	DIANA	0.67	–	2.79	–	–	–	–	–	–
Right-wing	Political Spring	–	4.88	8.65	2.94	2.28	–	–	–	–
Far-right	EPEN	–	0.14	0.78	0.24	–	–	–	–	–
Far-right	Golden Dawn	–	–	–	0.11	0.07	–	–	–	–
Far-right	LAOS	–	–	–	–	–	–	2.19	4.12	3.80

=== 2009–2019 ===
This period corresponds to Greek government-debt crisis, that changed dramatically the political stage. Early in the period, PASOK were able to capitalise on a loss of support for ND. However, by the early 2010s, PASOK were also attracting blame for their handling of the crisis, and the radical party SYRIZA became the largest party on the left. The position of the far-right was also strengthened in this period.

SYRIZA has since overtaken PASOK as the main party of the centre-left.Alexis Tsipras led SYRIZA to victory in the general election held on 25 January 2015, falling short of an outright majority in Parliament by just two seats. The following morning, Tsipras reached an agreement with Independent Greeks party to form a coalition, and he was sworn in as Prime Minister of Greece. Tsipras called snap elections in August 2015, resigning from his post, which led to a month-long caretaker administration headed by judge Vassiliki Thanou-Christophilou, Greece's first female prime minister. In the September 2015 general election, Alexis Tsipras led SYRIZA to another victory, winning 145 out of 300 seats and re-forming the coalition with the Independent Greeks. However, he was defeated in the July 2019 general election by Kyriakos Mitsotakis who leads New Democracy. On 7 July 2019, Kyriakos Mitsotakis was sworn in as the new prime minister of Greece. He formed a centre-right government after the landslide victory of his New Democracy party.

Political position/ Ideology	Political Party	2009; European; Elections	2009 Legislative Elections	2012 May Legislative Elections	2012 June Legislative Elections	2014; European; Elections	2015 Jan. Legislative Elections	2015 Sept. Legislative Elections	2019; European; Elections	2019 Legislative Elections
Political position/ Ideology	Political Party	%	%	%	%	%	%	%	%	%
Far-left	KKE	8.35	7.54	8.48	4.50	6.11	5.47	5.55	5.33	5.30
Far-left	ANTARSYA	0.43	0.36	1.19	0.33	0.72	0.64	0.85	0.64	0.41
Left wing	SYRIZA	4.70	4.60	16.79	26.89	26.57	36.34	35.46	23.78	31.53
Left wing	Popular Unity	—	—	—	—	—	—	2.86	0.56	0.23
Left wing	MeRA25	—	—	—	—	—	—	—	2.99	3.44
Left wing	Course of Freedom	—	—	—	—	—	—	—	1.61	1.46
Centre-left	PASOK / (MC, OT, DC)	36.64	43.92	13.18	12.28	8.02	4.68	6.28	7.72	8.10
Centre-left	Democratic Left	—	—	6.11	6.25	1.20	0.49	—	—	—
Centre-left	Social Agreement	—	—	0.96	—	—	—	—	—	—
Centre-left	The River	—	—	—	—	6.60	6.05	4.09	1.51	—
Centre-left	KIDISO	—	—	—	—	—	2.46	—	—	—
Ecologist	Ecologist Greens	3.49	2.53	2.93	0.88	0.90	—	—	0.87	—
Centre	Union of Centrists	0.38	0.27	0.61	0.28	0.65	1.79	3.43	1.45	1.24
Centre	Teleia	—	—	—	—	—	1.77	—	—	—
Liberal	Drassi	0.76	—	1.80	—	—	—	—	—	—
Liberal	Recreate Greece	—	—	2.15	—	—	—	0.53	0.69	0.74
Liberal	Democratic Alliance	—	—	2.55	—	—	—	—	—	—
Liberal	Drassi/Recreate Greece	—	—	—	1.59	0.91	—	—	—	—
Liberal	Greek European Citizens	—	—	—	—	1.40	—	—	—	—
Centre-right	New Democracy	32.29	33.48	18.85	29.66	22.72	27.81	28.10	33.13	39.85
Right wing	PAMME	1.27	–	–	–	–	–	—	—	—
Right wing	Independent Greeks	—	—	10.62	7.51	3.46	4.75	3.69	0.80	—
Right wing	UFP	—	—	—	—	1.04	—	—	—	—
Far Right	LAOS	7.14	5.63	2.89	1.58	2.69	1.03	—	1.23	—
Far Right	Golden Dawn	0.46	0.29	6.97	6.92	9.39	6.28	6.99	4.88	2.93
Far Right	Greek Solution	—	—	—	—	—	—	—	4.18	3.70

=== 2020s ===
In March 2020, Greece's parliament elected a non-partisan candidate, Ekaterini Sakellaropoulou, as the first female President of Greece.

In June 2023, conservative New Democracy party won the legislative election, meaning another four-year term as prime minister for Kyriakos Mitsotakis.
