= 1975 Greek presidential election =

- 19 June 1975
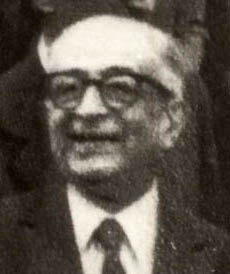

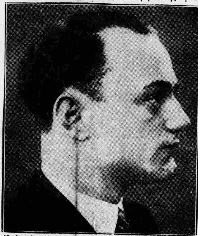
Nominee	Konstantinos Tsatsos	Panagiotis Kanellopoulos
Party	New Democracy	Centre Union
President before election
Michail Stasinopoulos
Non-political (supported by New Democracy)
President
Konstantinos Tsatsos
New Democracy

An indirect election for the position of President of the Hellenic Republic was held by the Hellenic Parliament on 19 June 1975.

Following the restoration of democracy in Greece, the distinguished jurist Michail Stasinopoulos was elected as the first, but provisional, President of the Third Hellenic Republic on 18 December 1974. With the entry into force of a new constitution in 1975 and the finalization of the new political framework, elections were held for the first regular President of the Republic. The ruling conservative New Democracy, which had 215 MPs, supported conservative politician Konstantinos Tsatsos, while the second-largest party, Centre Union – New Forces, proposed another conservative politician and former Prime Minister of Greece, Panagiotis Kanellopoulos. In the ballot held on 19 June, Tsatsos was comfortably elected with 210 votes out of 295 MPs present, with Kanellopoulos receiving 65 votes and the 20 MPs of PASOK and United Left dropping blank votes.
