= President of Greece =

Head of state

President of the Hellenic Republic
- Πρόεδρος της Ελληνικής Δημοκρατίας
- Presidential standard

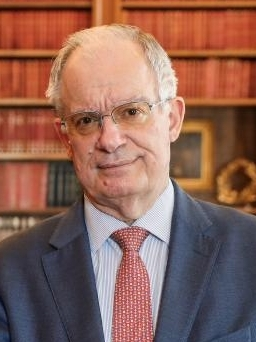
- Incumbent; Konstantinos Tasoulas since 13 March 2025
- Style: His Excellency; Mr. President (informal)
- Status: Head of state Commander-in-chief
- Seat: Presidential Mansion, Athens
- Nominator: Parliamentary groups
- Appointer: Hellenic Parliament
- Term length: Five years, renewable once
- Constituting instrument: Constitution of Greece (1975)
- Precursor: King of Greece
- Inaugural holder: Michail Stasinopoulos (Third Republic)
- Formation: 18 December 1974; 51 years ago
- Deputy: President of the Hellenic Parliament
- Salary: €138,732 annually
- Website: www.presidency.gr

The president of Greece, officially the president of the Hellenic Republic (Note: Greek: Πρόεδρος της Ελληνικής Δημοκρατίας, romanized: Próedros tis Ellinikís Dimokratías) and commonly referred to in Greek as the president of the Republic, (Note: Greek: Πρόεδρος της Δημοκρατίας (ΠτΔ), romanized: Próedros tis Dimokratías) is the head of state of Greece. The president is elected by the Hellenic Parliament; the role has been mainly ceremonial since the 1986 constitutional reform. The office was formally established by the Constitution of Greece in 1975, but has antecedents in the Second Hellenic Republic of 1924–1935 and the Greek junta in 1973–1974 which predated the transition to the current Third Hellenic Republic.

== Powers ==
The president is the nominal commander-in-chief of the Greek Armed Forces and occupies the first place in the country's order of precedence. Although the Greek Constitution of 1974 vested the presidency with considerable powers on paper, in practice presidents took a largely ceremonial role; the prime minister of Greece is the active chief executive of the Greek government and the country's leading political figure. The president's role was formally brought into line with practice by the 1986 constitutional amendment, which reduced the official powers.

== Election ==
According to Article 32 of the Greek Constitution, the president is elected for a five-year term by the Hellenic Parliament in a special session at least a month before the incumbent's term expires. Voting takes place in up to five ballots, separated by no more than five days.

The first and second ballots require a supermajority of 200 out of the 300-person body, dropping to 180 on the third. The fourth ballot requires a simple majority of 151 votes. The fifth and last ballot is then decided by a relative majority.

== Oath of office ==
Before taking office, the president must recite an oath in front of the Parliament according to the Article 33, paragraph 2 of the Greek Constitution:

I swear in the name of the Holy, Consubstantial and Indivisible Trinity to safeguard the Constitution and the laws, to ensure their faithful observance, to defend the national independence and territorial integrity of the Country, to protect the rights and liberties of the Greeks and to serve the general interest and the progress of the Greek People.

== Succession ==
According to the Constitution of Greece, in the event of a temporary absence of the president of Greece on account of illness, travel abroad or similar circumstances, the speaker of the parliament serves as acting president, and exercises the powers of the state president until the president resumes their functions, and in the event that the presidency falls vacant as a result of death or resignation or for any other reason, until the election of a new president. The most recent person to have served as Acting President was Ioannis Alevras, following the resignation of Konstantinos Karamanlis due to the constitutional crisis in 1985.

== Official residence ==
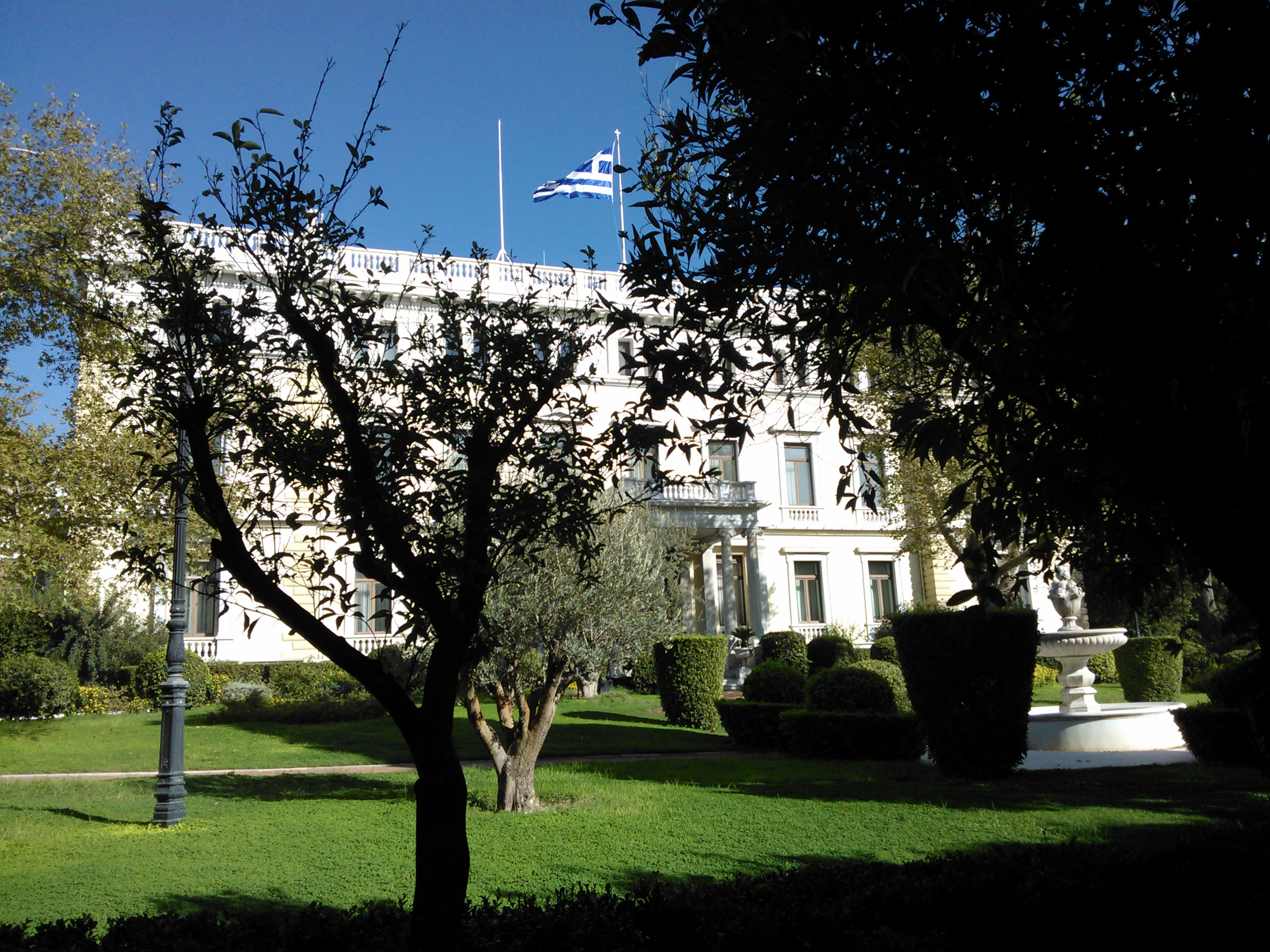
The presidential Mansion in Athens

The official residence of the president of Greece is the Presidential Mansion, formerly the New Royal Palace, in central Athens.

== History ==
The current Third Hellenic Republic (Note: Greek: Γʹ Ελληνική Δημοκρατία) was established in 1974 during the period of metapolitefsi, after the end of the Greek junta which had controlled Greece since the coup d'état of 21 April 1967.

On 1 June 1973, the then leader of the military junta and regent for the exiled King Constantine II, Georgios Papadopoulos, abolished the Greek monarchy and proclaimed himself President of the Republic. A staged referendum on 29 July 1973 confirmed the regime change, and passed a new constitution which established a presidential republic. This attempt at controlled democratization was ended by Brigadier Dimitrios Ioannidis' overthrow of Papadopoulos on 25 November 1973. The republic and its symbols (but not the semi-presidential system) were formally maintained, but they were nothing more than a façade for the military regime. Lt. General Phaedon Gizikis was appointed President of the Republic, but power was in the hands of Ioannidis, who ruled behind the scenes.

After the fall of the junta and the return to civilian rule under Konstantinos Karamanlis in August 1974, the constitutional acts of the military regime were deemed invalid, and a new referendum was held on 8 December 1974, which confirmed the abolition of the monarchy. In the interim, Gizikis, remained in office as President. After the plebiscite, he was succeeded by the first elected president, Michail Stasinopoulos.

A new constitution, promulgated on 11 June 1975, declared Greece a presidential parliamentary democracy (or republic) (Note: "Δημοκρατία" can be translated either as 'democracy' or 'republic'.) The first constitutional amendments were proposed by Andreas Papandreou in 1985, though dubious procedures triggering a constitutional crisis, and they reduced the presidential powers, which were acting as checks and balances against the powerful position of the prime minister. The constitution was further revised in 2001, 2008, and 2019, and is still in force today.

=== List of presidents of the Third Hellenic Republic ===
President			Term of office			Political party
No.	Portrait	Name (Birth–Death)	Took office	Left office	Time in office	Political party
1		Michail Stasinopoulos; Μιχαήλ Στασινόπουλος (1903–2002)	18 December 1974	19 July 1975	213 days	New Democracy
1		Michail Stasinopoulos; Μιχαήλ Στασινόπουλος (1903–2002)	Writer and jurist, former President of the Council of State. Supported by New Democracy, he was elected unopposed by the ND-dominated Parliament resulting from the 17 November 1974 election and following the definitive abolition of the Greek monarchy in the 8 December 1974 referendum, with 206 votes on the first ballot.			
2		Konstantinos Tsatsos; Κωνσταντίνος Τσάτσος (1899–1987)	19 July 1975	10 May 1980	4 years, 296 days	New Democracy
2		Konstantinos Tsatsos; Κωνσταντίνος Τσάτσος (1899–1987)	Jurist and cabinet minister with the National Radical Union and New Democracy. Elected by the 1974 Parliament on the first ballot with 210 votes against Panagiotis Kanellopoulos.			
3		Konstantinos Karamanlis; Κωνσταντίνος Καραμανλής (1907–1998)	10 May 1980	10 March 1985 (resigned)	4 years, 304 days	New Democracy
3		Konstantinos Karamanlis; Κωνσταντίνος Καραμανλής (1907–1998)	Prime Minister as leader of the National Radical Union in 1955–1963 and again as leader of New Democracy from 1974. Supported by ND, the KODISO and KKE Interior, he was elected by the ND-dominated 1977 Parliament on the third ballot with 183 votes against seven other candidates put forward by minor parties. Resigned before the end of his term due to his falling out with Andreas Papandreou and the PASOK's decision not to support him for a second term in 1985.			
–		Ioannis Alevras; Ιωάννης Αλευράς (1912–1995)	10 March 1985	30 March 1985	20 days	PASOK
–		Ioannis Alevras; Ιωάννης Αλευράς (1912–1995)	PASOK MP and Speaker of Parliament, he substituted for Karamanlis following his early resignation.			
4		Christos Sartzetakis; Χρήστος Σαρτζετάκης (1929–2022)	30 March 1985	5 May 1990	5 years, 36 days	Independent
4		Christos Sartzetakis; Χρήστος Σαρτζετάκης (1929–2022)	Jurist, famous for his role in investigating the Lambrakis assassination. He was supported by the PASOK and KKE. Elected unopposed by the PASOK-dominated 1981 Parliament on the third ballot with 180 votes.			
(3)		Konstantinos Karamanlis; Κωνσταντίνος Καραμανλής (1907–1998)	5 May 1990	10 March 1995	4 years, 310 days	New Democracy
(3)		Konstantinos Karamanlis; Κωνσταντίνος Καραμανλής (1907–1998)	The November 1989 Parliament failed to elect a President after three ballots, with the votes of the PASOK being split between incumbent Christos Sartzetakis and Ioannis Alevras, leading to its dissolution and a snap election. Karamanlis did not stand as a candidate during the first three ballots, but was put forward by New Democracy after the election. He was elected by the new 1990 Parliament on the fifth ballot with 153 votes, opposed by the PASOK-sponsored candidate Ioannis Alevras and Konstantinos Despotopoulos of Synaspismos.			
5		Konstantinos Stephanopoulos; Κωνσταντίνος Στεφανόπουλος (1926–2016)	10 March 1995	12 March 2005	10 years, 2 days	Independent
5		Konstantinos Stephanopoulos; Κωνσταντίνος Στεφανόπουλος (1926–2016)	National Radical Union and New Democracy MP and cabinet minister, after 1985 leader of the breakaway Democratic Renewal party. Supported by the PASOK and Political Spring, he was elected by the PASOK-dominated 1993 Parliament on the third ballot with 181 votes, against ND's candidate Athanasios Tsaldaris. His reelection in 2000 was by the PASOK-dominated 1996 Parliament, as a joint candidate of the PASOK and ND, standing against Synaspismos's Leonidas Kyrkos.			
6		Karolos Papoulias; Κάρολος Παπούλιας (1929–2021)	12 March 2005	13 March 2015	10 years, 1 day	PASOK
6		Karolos Papoulias; Κάρολος Παπούλιας (1929–2021)	PASOK MP and cabinet minister. He was elected unopposed for his first term by the New Democracy-dominated 2004 Parliament as a joint candidate of ND and the PASOK on the first ballot with 279 votes. Reelected unopposed for a second term in 2010 by the PASOK-dominated 2009 Parliament as a joint candidate of the PASOK, ND and the LAOS on the first ballot with 266 votes.			
7		Prokopis Pavlopoulos; Προκόπης Παυλόπουλος (born 1950)	13 March 2015	13 March 2020	5 years	New Democracy
7		Prokopis Pavlopoulos; Προκόπης Παυλόπουλος (born 1950)	New Democracy MP and cabinet minister. The previous ND-PASOK coalition failed to elect Stavros Dimas in the first three rounds, leading to a new election, which was won by Syriza. Supported by Syriza, ANEL and ND, Pavlopoulos was elected by the new 2015 Parliament on the fourth ballot with 233 votes, opposed by the candidate of The River and PASOK Nikos Alivizatos.			
8		Katerina Sakellaropoulou; Κατερίνα Σακελλαροπούλου (born 1956)	13 March 2020	13 March 2025	5 years	Independent
8		Katerina Sakellaropoulou; Κατερίνα Σακελλαροπούλου (born 1956)	President of the Council of State from 2018 to 2020, she was elected on 22 January 2020, supported by New Democracy, Syriza and the KINAL. Upon her inauguration, she became the first woman to hold the office of President of Greece.			
9		Konstantinos Tasoulas; Κωνσταντίνος Τασούλας (born 1959)	13 March 2025	Incumbent	1 year, 219 days	New Democracy
9		Konstantinos Tasoulas; Κωνσταντίνος Τασούλας (born 1959)	New Democracy MP, cabinet minister and President of the Hellenic Parliament from 2019 to 2025. He was elected on the fourth ballot, after winning 160 votes of New Democracy MPs and independents.			

== See also ==
- List of heads of state of Greece

== Sources ==
- Featherstone, Kevin; Katsoudas, Dimitrios K., eds. (1987). Political change in Greece: Before and after the colonels. London & New York: Taylor & Francis. ISBN 9781000992144.
- Pridham, Geoffrey, ed. (2012). Securing Democracy. London & New York: Taylor & Francis. ISBN 9781134975419.
