= Rae Dalven =

Jewish Greek-American author and translator

Rachel Dalven (25 April 1904, Preveza, Janina Vilayet, Ottoman Empire – 27 July 1992, New York City), also known as Rae Dalven, was a Romaniote writer who came to the United States as a child. She is best known for her translations of Cavafy's works, poems by other Romaniote Jewish writers, and for her books and plays about the Jews of Ioannina.

== Biography ==
Dalven's parents, Israel and Esther, moved to New York in 1909 with their two children, Joseph and Rachel, leaving their other daughter, Simcha (Sophie) with relatives in Greece due to an eye infection that would have prevented her admission to the U.S. Dalven went on to graduate from Hunter College and subsequently earned a doctorate in English at New York University. She was a professor of drama and English literature at Ladycliff College as well as the chair of the department. She published The Complete Poems of Cavafy in 1961, when the poet was largely unknown in the English-speaking world, with an introduction by W. H. Auden, who praised her translations in Modern Greek Poetry (1949) for "introducing a world of poetry which has been closed to us".

Dalven's career as a translator began with the poems of her nephew by marriage, Joseph Eliya [el], who died in 1931, after learning about him from a cousin that sparked their correspondence for the last three years of his life. In 1935, Eliya's mother requested that Dalven translate her son's poetry into English as his dying wish. She made trips to Ioannina, Eliya's hometown, in 1936 and 1937, prior to the destruction of the Jewish community there. The notes and impressions she recorded eventually became the foundation for her future books and plays about the Romaniote community of Ioannina. Her translations of Eliya's poems, published in 1944 by Anatolia Press in New York, were some of the earliest translations of modern Greek poetry published in the United States and outside of Greece. Her other notable translations include the poems of Yiannis Ritsos, a communist whose poems were banned during the Greek junta (1967-1974) - Dalven's translations were some of the first translations of his poetry following the end of the dictatorship. She considered her work on Cavafy her favorite.

Although Dalven is best known as a translator and historian, she was also a playwright and graduated from the Yale Drama School with an M.A. in 1941. She wrote four autobiographical plays: Marriages are Arranged in Heaven, Our Kind of People, A Matter of Survival, and Esther. However three of her plays survived only in fragmentary form. A fourth was considered lost until it was discovered in the US Copyright Office in 2017.

Dalven also served as the editor-in-chief of The Sephardic Scholar at Yeshiva University, the president of the American Society of Sephardic Studies, and was on the board of the American Friends of the Jewish Museum of Greece. Towards the end of her life, she taught modern Modern Greek literature at New York University.

Dalven died at the age of 87 at Beth Israel Medical Center in Manhattan. Her final book, Daughters of Sappho, an anthology of 25 female Greek poets in translation from the 1920s to the 1990s, was published posthumously in 1994. The anthology, with nearly two hundred poems, was the first comprehensive collection of contemporary Greek women's poetry in English. Poets in the anthology included Ioanna Tsatsou, née Seferiádou, the wife of Konstantinos Tsatsos and sister of Giorgos Seferis; Victoria Theodorou, who chronicled the Greek Civil War; and Nana Issaia, the Romaniote poet and painter who translated Sylvia Plath into Greek.

== Personal life ==
In addition to her older siblings, seven other children were born after the family arrived in New York. Dalven was married to Jack Negrin, also a Romaniote Jew, but the marriage ended in divorce with no children. Her brother Joseph was the medical director of the Sephardic Home for the Aged for thirty five years.

== Rae Dalven Prize ==
The Rae Dalven Prize was awarded for the first time in 1997. NYU's Alexander S. Onassis Program in Hellenic Studies requests submissions for the annual prize to acknowledge academic excellence in Hellenic Studies among students at New York University.

=== Recipients ===
- 2025 - Nicole Katherine Tiliakos
- 2024 - Alex Alexakos
- 2023 - Brian Woody
- 2022 - Rohun Sharma
- 2021 - Aashish Khubchandani
- 2020 - Stavroula Estee Spyropoulos
- 2019 - Dinah Rokhinson
- 2018 - Alexander Kyriakides
- 2017 - Yannis Tsesmelis
- 2016 - Madeleine Ball
- 2015 - Vaia Trittas
- 2013 - John Aldrich, Essay: "All Eyes on Greece: The Greek Government-debt Crisis through the Lens of the Left-wing Media."
- 2012 - Rebecca Bruehlman
- 2011 - Christos Mark Birkitt
- 2010 - Afrodite Fountas, Essay: “Mark Douka’s Fool’s Gold: Traces of the Impact of the 1967 Coup on the Greek National Consciousness.”
- 2009 - Anna E. Venetsanos
- 2008 - Meredith Berger
- 2007 - Eleni Mathioudakis
- 2006 - Maria Katradis
- 2004 - Georgia Giannoukakis
- 2003 - Kaleroy Tzezailidis and Megan Manos
- 2002 - Mariza Daras
- 2001 - John Saragas, Essay: The Greek American Diaspora in the 20th Century
- 2000 - Niki Kekos, Essay: "Intoxicated" by Death: The Civil War Poetry of Takis Sinopoulos
- 1999 - Evelina Zarkh, Essay: Shadows in the Mirror: Transcendent Vision and the Presence of the Past in Ritsos' "The Dead House" and "Under the Shadow of the Mountain."
- 1998 - Artemis Loi, Essay: Language and ideology in Karapanou's Kassandra and the Wolf
- 1997 - Areti Serkizis, Essay: Classical allusion in Seferis' Mythistorema
