= 1974 Greek republic referendum =

Constitutional referendum in Greece

- 8 December 1974

Results
Choice	Votes	%
Republic	3,245,111	69.18%
Constitutional monarchy	1,445,875	30.82%
Valid votes	4,690,986	99.39%
Invalid or blank votes	28,801	0.61%
Total votes	4,719,787	100.00%
Registered voters/turnout	6,244,539	75.58%
- "Republic" vote share by constituency

A referendum on the constitutional form of the state was held in Greece on 8 December 1974.

After the collapse of the military junta that ruled the country since 1967, the longstanding dispute between republicans and monarchists re-emerged. The junta had already held a referendum of dubious integrity the previous year on the same question, producing a vote in favor of a republic, which Georgios Papadopoulos used as a pretext to have himself declared President. However, after the collapse of the military regime and free elections the previous month, the newly elected government of Prime Minister Constantine Karamanlis decided to re-run the vote, the junta-era referendum being widely considered both electorally and legally questionable.

Despite Karamanlis’ long career in monarchist politics, the government forbade the former King Constantine II from returning to Greece to campaign, but allowed him to make a televised address to the nation. 69.2% of voters approved of a republic with a 75.6% turnout.

== Campaign ==
The referendum campaign included television debates in which King Constantine himself spoke in favor of restoring the monarchy, and those debating in favour of the republic included Marios Ploritis, Leonidas Kyrkos, Phaedon Vegleris, George Koumandos, Alexandros Panagoulis and Costas Simitis, the last of whom became Prime Minister in 1996.

Most parties did not actively campaign, with the representatives in television debates being prominent private citizens. Despite this, there was a partisan valence to the vote; United Left/KKE, Centre Union, and PASOK voters were mostly republican while those of the National Democratic Union, which had suffered a catastrophic electoral defeat three weeks prior, tended monarchist. New Democracy, the newly-elected governing party, was officially neutral; Karamanlis himself had a long history in the monarchist People's Party and National Radical Union but had clashed with the palace as prime minister in the 1960s; New Democracy continued the lineage of monarchist parties but was conceived as a more moderate force and did have a substantial minority of members from republican backgrounds. Moreover, during his exile in France, Karamanlis had become inspired by the conservative republicanism (an idea up to then politically paradoxical in Greece) of the Gaullists.

Two televised speeches a week were given to each side, with an additional two messages broadcast by the former king; a radio broadcast on 26 November and a television speech on 6 December.

== Results ==
Choice	Votes	%
Republic	3,245,111	69.18
Constitutional monarchy	1,445,875	30.82
Total	4,690,986	100.00
Valid votes	4,690,986	99.39
Invalid/blank votes	28,801	0.61
Total votes	4,719,787	100.00
Registered voters/turnout	6,244,539	75.58
Source: Nohlen & Stöver

=== By region ===
The electorate voted categorically in favour of republic. Crete, long a liberal and republican stronghold, gave more than 90% of its vote for the republic, but in around thirty constituencies, the result for republic was around 60–70%. The highest vote share for the restoration of the monarchy were in the Peloponnese and Thrace, at around 45%. The constituencies with the highest vote shares for the restoration were Laconia at 59.52%, Rhodope at 50.54%, Messenia with 49.24%, Elis at 46.88% and Argos at 46.67%.

Region	Republic (%)	Constitutional monarchy (%)
Athens A	75.60	24.40
Athens B	79.59	20.41
Aetolia-Acarnania	65.63	34.67
Argolis	53.33	46.67
Arkadia	56.99	43.01
Arta	56.21	43.79
Achaea	68.54	31.46
Kavala	73.64	26.36
Boeotia	65.46	35.24
Corfu	63.47	36.53
Drama	67.41	32.59
Dodecanese	63.78	36.22
Evros	60.27	39.73
Evrytania	60.69	39.31
Euboea	65.38	34.62
Grevena	61.20	38.80
Heraklion	89.43	10.57
Ilia	53.12	46.88
Ioannina	68.70	31.30
Imathia	71.77	28.23
Thessaloniki A	79.99	20.01
Thessaloniki B	68.12	31.88
Thesprotia	64.21	35.79
Zante	62.63	37.37
Karditsa	68.79	31.21
Kastoria	55.74	44.26
Cephalonia	66.17	33.83
Kilkis	59.71	40.29
Kozani	66.11	33.89
Corinthia	62.36	37.64
Cyclades	61.72	38.28
Larissa	67.82	32.18
Laconia	40.48	59.52
Lasithi	88.42	11.58
Lesvos	77.74	22.26
Lefkada	71.22	28.78
Magnesia	71.25	28.75
Messenia	50.76	49.24
Xanthi	53.75	46.25
Piraeus A	71.95	28.05
Piraeus B	81.70	18.30
Pella	65.09	34.91
Pieria	65.54	34.46
Preveza	62.01	37.99
Rethymno	94.10	5.90
Rhodope	49.46	50.54
Samos	64.38	35.62
Serres	64.82	35.18
Trikala	67.40	32.60
Attica	65.07	34.93
Fthiotida	63.58	36.42
Florina	60.36	39.64
Fokida	62.44	37.56
Chalcidice	58.17	41.83
Chania	92.70	7.30
Chios	72.95	27.05

== Aftermath ==
With the announcement of the results, Karamanlis said: "A cancer has been removed from the body of the nation today." On 15 December 1974, the incumbent President General Phaedon Gizikis (appointed by Ioannides in November 1973) submitted his resignation, and Karamanlis thanked him with a personal visit and by writing for his services to the country. On 18 December 1974, Michail Stasinopoulos, a state list MP for New Democracy, was elected and sworn in as provisional President of Greece, as the Parliament was to compose a new Constitution.

In February 1988, Prime Minister Constantine Mitsotakis stated in an interview given in London that although he was a republican, the manner in which the referendum was carried out had been "unfair". The statement attracted wide criticism in Greece and was debated in the media. For the remainder of his life, under the pretense of invoking the narrative style reserved for historical reminiscence, Mitsotakis continued to refer to the deposed monarch deferentially by referring to him as the "King" in multiple interviews.

In April 2007 the newspaper To Vima carried out a survey in which 11.6% of those polled wished for Greece to become a monarchy again.
