= 1980 Greek presidential election =

← 1975	23, 29 April and 5 May 1980	1985 →
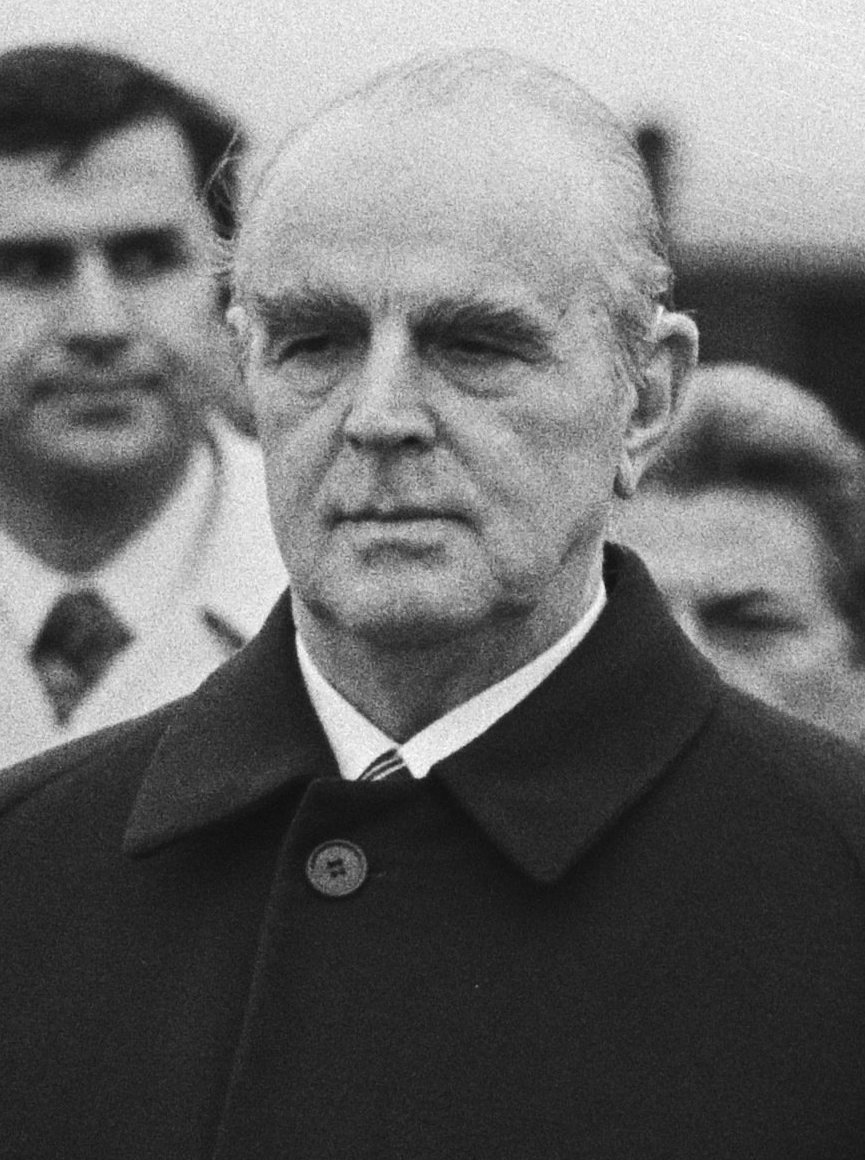

Nominee	Konstantinos Karamanlis	Ioannis Zigdis
Party	ND	EDIK
Electoral vote	183	3
Percentage	95.31%	2.08%
President before election
Konstantinos Tsatsos
ND
President
Konstantinos Karamanlis
ND

An indirect election for the position of President of the Hellenic Republic was held by the Hellenic Parliament in April–May 1980.

The Prime Minister Konstantinos Karamanlis' political party New Democracy possessed 175 seats out of 300 in the parliament, falling short of the required number for a straightaway election (200 votes in the first two rounds, 180 in the third). Karamanlis resigned as prime minister to stand for the presidency, being succeeded as prime minister by Georgios Rallis.

Several candidates were put forward by minor parties alongside Karamanlis, including Georgios Mylonas (KODISO), Leonidas Kyrkos (KKE Interior), Ioannis Zigdis (EDIK), Stelios Papathemelis, Ilias Iliou and Faidon Vegleris (United Democratic Left). Karamanlis received 179 votes and 180 votes in the first and second ballot respectively, and was elected on the third ballot with 183 votes, i.e., the 175 MPs of New Democracy as well as eight independent MPs and MPs from minor parties.

== Results ==
Candidate	Party	23 April		29 April		5 May	
Candidate	Party	Votes	%	Votes	%	Votes	%
Konstantinos Karamanlis	New Democracy	179	94.71	181	96.79	183	95.31
Georgios Mylonas	Party of Democratic Socialism	4	2.12	3	1.60	3	1.56
Leonidas Kyrkos	Communist Party of Greece (Interior)	1	0.53	1	0.53	1	0.52
Faidon Vegleris	United Democratic Left	1	0.53	1	0.53	1	0.52
Nikitas Venizelos	Union of the Democratic Centre	3	1.59				
Ilias Iliou	United Democratic Left	1	0.53				
Stelios Papathemelis	Independent			1	0.53		
Ioannis Zigdis	Union of the Democratic Centre	0	0.00	0	0.00	4	2.08
Total		189	100.00	187	100.00	192	100.00
Valid votes		189	92.65	187	93.50	192	94.12
Invalid/blank votes		15	7.35	13	6.50	12	5.88
Total votes		204	100.00	200	100.00	204	100.00
Registered voters/turnout		300	68.00	300	66.67	300	68.00
