= National Democratic Union =

National Democratic Union may refer to:

- National Democratic Union (Armenia) (founded 1993)
- National Democratic Union (Brazil) (1945–1965)
- National Democratic Union (Greece) (1974–1977)
- National Democratic Union (Italy) (1946)
- National Democratic Union (Panama), a political coalition in the 1984 Panamanian general election
