= Metapolitefsi =

1974 Greek transition to democracy

The metapolitefsi (Note: /ˌmɛtəˈpɒlɪtɛfsi/; Greek: μεταπολίτευση, romanized: metapolítefsi (alternatively transliterated as metapolíteusē), IPA: [metapoˈlitefsi]; lit. 'regime change') was a period in modern Greek history from the fall of the Ioannides military junta of 1973–74 to the transition period shortly after the 1974 legislative elections.

The metapolitefsi was ignited by the liberalisation plan of military dictator Georgios Papadopoulos, which was opposed by prominent politicians such as Panagiotis Kanellopoulos and Stephanos Stephanopoulos, and halted by the massive Athens Polytechnic uprising against the military junta. The counter coup of Dimitrios Ioannides, and his coup d'etat against President of Cyprus Makarios III, which led to the Turkish invasion of Cyprus, brought the dictatorship down.

The appointment of the interim "national unity government", led by former prime minister Konstantinos Karamanlis, saw Karamanlis legalise the communist party and found the center-right but still parliamentary (non-military) New Democracy party, which won the elections of 1974 by a landslide.

== Background ==
=== Papadopoulos's failed liberalisation process ===
Following a referendum in late July 1973 that ratified the Greek Constitution of 1973 by a large majority, under which the Greek monarchy was abolished and Greece became a presidential republic, Georgios Papadopoulos, the head of the military junta that took power in 1967, became President of Greece. Soon after, in September 1973, Papadopoulos initiated an attempt at metapolitefsi or process of liberalisation, also known as the Markezinis Experiment, aiming to legitimise his government and rehabilitate its image as an international, and especially European, pariah after six years of dictatorship during which he appointed himself to a multitude of high-echelon government positions including Regent, Prime Minister, Minister for Defence, and Minister for the Interior. These excesses had the effect of further undermining his credibility and the seriousness of his regime both at home and abroad. Feeling confident of his grasp on power, he requested the resignation of the thirteen military men in his cabinet, dissolved the "revolutionary council" which had ruled Greece since the beginning of the coup, and appointed Spyros Markezinis as Prime Minister of Greece, entrusting him with the task of leading Greece to parliamentary rule. However, under the Greek Constitution of 1973, the presidential powers were far greater than those of the parliament.

Under the condition that Papadopoulos would curtail any military interference that could hinder the process, Spyros Markezinis was the only old guard politician prepared to assist in the controversial mission of helping the transition to some form of parliamentary rule. Having secured quasi-dictatorial presidential powers under the new constitution, Papadopoulos not only acquiesced but ordered a wide range of liberalisation measures, including the abolition of martial law, the easing of censorship and the release of all political prisoners. Even the long banned music of Mikis Theodorakis was allowed back in the airwaves. The lifting of censorship, "created a positive political and cultural climate that allowed comfortable margins for the pluralistic circulation of ideas". Scores of new publications were produced that covered a wide ideological spectrum, and the main issues of the era such as the Vietnam War, the Cultural Revolution, the Sino-Soviet split, the death of Che Guevara, and the 1968 student protests in France and Italy were widely covered. This had the effect of bringing a wide segment of the Greek youth "into contact with the most significant works of historical and contemporary Marxist, anarchist, and Bourgeois radical thought".

Ostensibly free elections were announced soon after to be held in 1974, in which political formations including part of the traditional left, but not the Communist Party of Greece (which was banned during the Greek Civil War), were expected to participate.

Papadopoulos failed to convince the better part of the old political elite—including politicians such as Panagiotis Kanellopoulos and Stephanos Stephanopoulos—to participate in his liberalisation attempt. Most old guard politicians could not condone the fact that some of their colleagues were to remain excluded from the political process. Moreover, they were opposed to the concentration of powers delegated to the president, and resented having been demonised by Papadopoulos's junta as palaiokommatistes (lit. 'antiquated party men') during the previous six years. In fact Kanellopoulos, who was Prime Minister of Greece when deposed by the 1967 junta, remained vehemently opposed to any form of cooperation with the regime throughout the dictatorship years.

=== 1973 Athens Polytechnic Uprising ===
A transition from one form of government to another, especially from dictatorship to democracy, is typically difficult and fraught with uncertainty and anxiety for the country that undertakes it. Greece's transition was no different as the military, political elites and students sought to affirm their respective positions in society. In particular, the student movement in Greece had been repressed by the dictatorship, and student activists were marginalised and suppressed in the name of anti-communism. Early student activism during the dictatorship included the self-immolation in 1970 of geology student Kostas Georgakis in Genoa, Italy, in protest against the junta. His action served to demonstrate the depth of the resistance and resentment against the regime.

Student activism in Greece was traditionally strong and—unlike in some dictatorships where democracy was a distant dream—had a long and established record of action in democratic times, and it possessed the memory of past democratic action. In addition, the stiff constraints imposed by the rigid and artificial Papadopoulos transition upon the democratic body politic of Greece antagonised not only the politicians but also the intelligentsia, whose primary exponents were the students.

In November 1973, the Athens Polytechnic uprising broke out starting with the usual student protest tactics such as building occupations and radio broadcasts. A smaller uprising had preceded it two weeks earlier at the Athens Law School and it was still active even as events at the Polytechnic were unfolding.

Unlike a previous strike in the Athens law school in February 1973, prior to their liberalisation attempt, where the regime negotiated at length with the students and bloodshed was avoided, in November 1973, the regime made no attempt to negotiate with the students. At the same time the students taking part in the smaller law school demonstration moved into the Polytechnic, as the events there gathered momentum.

During democratic times, such a protest might have been defused using tactics based on usual historical precedents such as negotiations with student leaders, and failing that, resorting to using normal crowd control methods followed by more negotiations, as the regime had done with the law students some weeks before.

However, this student protest happened in the middle of the uncertain political experiment of transition from dictatorship to democracy. Given that the main engineer of the transition, Papadopoulos, did not have much experience in democratic transitions, his liberalisation plan was derailed as students (and later workers) used the liberalisation to start their uprising, which forced the Papadopoulos regime to clamp-down hard on the protests, a move that discredited the liberalisation Papadopoulos was trying to implement.

In failing to negotiate, the junta made martyrs out of the Polytechnic students. This in turn gave the student protest momentum and it eventually evolved into a near-universal demonstration against the dictatorship. At that point, the transitional government panicked, sending a tank crashing through the gates of the Athens Polytechnic. Afterwards, Markezinis requested Papadopoulos to re-impose martial law. The student protests were the first sign that Papadopoulos's attempt at "liberalisation" in Greece had begun to fail.

The inherent contradictions of the coup, carefully suppressed during the dictatorship, became more visible during the regime's attempt at democratisation. In its strident anti-communism, the junta was opposed by large sections of Greek society which wished to overcome the trauma of the Greek Civil War.

The events at Athens Polytechnic unfolded precisely as the dictatorship's more staunch members had hoped. Brigadier Dimitrios Ioannides, leader of a junta within the junta, was disdainful of Papadopoulos, his perceived move to democracy, and his pursuit of a foreign policy more independent of the United States.

The conditions for Papadopoulos's overthrow by Ioannides became easier since the former would not believe Markezinis and others in his circle when warned about Ioannides's plans to overthrow him. Papadopoulos responded with: "Mimis (Note: A nickname for Dimitrios, Ioannides's given name.) is an 'Arsakeiás', (Note: Arsakeiás (Αρσακειάς) was a female student of the Arsakeio, and a metaphor for a "quiet, shy girl".) he would never do something like that".

=== 1973 Ioannides Counter Coup ===
Ioannides, a disaffected hardliner and a man with an established anti-democratic record, seized the opportunity. On 25 November 1973, he used the uprising as a pretext to stage a counter coup – which had been planned months prior to the events at the Polytechnic – that overthrew Papadopoulos and put an abrupt end to Markezinis's attempt at transition to democratic rule.

Ioannides's involvement in inciting unit commanders of the security forces to commit criminal acts during the Athens Polytechnic uprising, so that he could facilitate his upcoming coup, was noted in the indictment presented to the court by the prosecutor during the junta trials and in his subsequent conviction in the Polytechneion trial where he was found to have been morally responsible for the events.

During the Ioannides coup the radio broadcasts, following the now familiar coup in progress scenario featuring martial music interspersed with military orders and curfew announcements, kept repeating that the army was taking back the reins of power in order to save the principles of the 1967 revolution and that the overthrow of the Papadopoulos-Markezinis government was supported by the army, the navy, and the air force.

They simultaneously announced that the new coup was a "continuation of the revolution of 1967" and accused Papadopoulos with "straying from the ideals of the 1967 revolution" and "pushing the country towards parliamentary rule too quickly".

Ioannides proceeded to arrest Markezinis and Papadopoulos, cancelled the elections that were planned for 1974, reinstated martial law, and appointed a puppet government headed by old junta member General Phaedon Gizikis as the new president, and civilian, and old Papadopoulos junta cabinet member, Adamantios Androutsopoulos as the prime minister.

Unlike Papadopoulos, Ioannides was not concerned with legal or democratic processes; he was prepared for a dictatorship. Being a more orthodox dictator and thinking in simpler terms than Papadopoulos, he solved the dilemma on how to achieve a democratic transition by dropping the plan completely.

Prior to seizing power, Ioannides preferred to work in the background and never held any formal office in the junta government. Reflecting his penchant for secrecy, the press described him as the "invisible dictator". Now he ruled Greece from the shadows, and was the de facto leader of a puppet state composed by members—some of whom were rounded up by ESA soldiers in roving jeeps to serve and others that were simply chosen by mistake. Adamantios Androutsopoulos, the new junta prime minister, was described as a political non-entity by The New York Times.

At his frequent press conferences during his rule, Papadopoulos often used "the patient in a cast analogy" to describe his assault on the body politic of Greece. He usually answered questions on the topic of democratic transition from the press by referring to the "patient" analogy in a jovial manner. Typically the "doctor" had to operate on the "patient" by putting restraints on the "patient", tying him on a surgical bed to perform the "operation" so that the life of the "patient" would not be "endangered" during the operation.

Papadopoulos indicated his intention of ending military rule once the political system had recovered to his satisfaction and that the treatment would progress on some legal and political basis.

In 1968, Papadopoulos had indicated that he was eager for a reform process and tried to contact Markezinis at the time. He then repeatedly attempted to initiate reforms in the next couple of years, only to be thwarted by the hardliners including Ioannides. Subsequent to his 1970 failed attempt at reform, he threatened to resign and was dissuaded only after the hardliners renewed their personal allegiance to him.

Contrarily, Ioannides did not talk to the press nor did he offer any analogies for his proposed treatment. He therefore abandoned the "patient in a cast" analogy that Papadopoulos offered in order to make a political statement that no democratic transition would take place during his tenure in power. This also indicated that Ioannides was not concerned about legal formalities. He was considered a "ruthless dictator who toppled the [Papadopoulos] junta for being too liberal". Ioannidis was considered a "purist and a moralist, a type of Greek Gaddafi". At the time, Time had described Ioannides as "a rigid, puritanical xenophobe – he has never been outside Greece or Cyprus – who might try to turn Greece into a European equivalent of Muammar Gaddafi's Libya".

==== Torture of dissenters ====
He who enters here exits friend or cripple.

— ESA operating doctrine

Ioannides's junta moved quickly to stifle any dissent, reinstituting and accelerating repressive measures – such as censorship, expulsions, arbitrary detentions, and torture – described as among the harshest imposed in Greece, and earning the junta an international reputation as a police state. Ioannides's main instrument of terror, was the Greek Military Police. The torture centre in Athens has been described as the "place that made Greece tremble". The Greek Military Police could arrest anyone, including superior officers, which generated the popular saying: "Any [member of the GMP] is equal to a major in the army". Even Papadopoulos, who in 1969 signed the law which gave "extraordinary legal powers" to the Greek Military Police, had them used against him in 1973 during Ioannides's coup. Artists, painters, and intellectuals who had publicly expressed anti-junta sentiments or created a work that criticised the junta, were remanded to GMP centres, used to intimidate dissidents, and spread fear of dissent.

People were held incommunicado without the GMP notifying anyone for weeks or months, and were only allowed limited communication thereafter with their families through the Greek Red Cross. Loud music blared from the detention centres in order to suppress victims' screams." Torture techniques included sleep deprivation, starvation, beatings, and psychological blackmail involving family members. The intensity of violence was such that brain injuries could result after torture sessions, as experienced by Greek Army Major Spyros Moustaklis, who became partially paralysed and unable to speak for life after 47 days of torture.

=== 1974 failed Cypriot coup ===
Having successfully terrorised the population, the "junta nova" tried to realise its foreign policy ambitions by launching a military coup against President Makarios III of Cyprus. Gizikis obliged by issuing the order for the coup on Ioannides's behalf.

At the time, Makarios was both Archbishop and President of Cyprus. He was deposed by military coup on 15 July 1974, and was subsequently replaced by Nikos Sampson. However, the coup backfired as Turkey reacted with Operation Atilla on 20 July; the Turkish invasion of Cyprus had thus begun.

The military and political disaster in both Greece and Cyprus consequently led to hundreds of thousands of deaths, which traumatised the Greek body politic. This was the final straw for Ioannides who had already instigated or participated in three coups in seven years – a record in modern Greek history – with catastrophic results for both countries.

== 1974 post-invasion paralysis ==
Immediately after the Turkish invasion of Cyprus, the dictators – not expecting such a disastrous outcome – eventually decided that Ioannides's approach was catastrophic for the country's interests. The complete rationale for their subsequent actions is not known to date.

In the early hours of the Cyprus crisis, indications of panic and indecision in the junta government were manifestly evident from the reaction of the Greek public as they raided supermarkets and grocery stores all over Greece, fearing an all-out war with Turkey.

During their seven years in power, the regime promoted the concept of a "New Greece" (Note: Νέα Ελλάδα, Néa Helláda) under the slogan of "Greece of the Christian Greeks", (Note: Ελλάς Ελλήνων Χριστιανών, Hellás Hellínon Christianón) which it presented as an alternative to the previous party system and its politicians. The subsequent transfer of political authority returned power to figures associated with the pre-regime political establishment, which the regime has previously criticised as representatives of the "old party system".

There are two possible considerations which could assist in resolving the paradox: firstly, due to the risk of imminent war with Turkey, there was no room for negotiations during the transition from military to political rule; secondly, since the military failed in the one area they were supposed to be competent by showing inadequate organisation during war preparations and ultimately failing to protect Cyprus from the invasion, they also lost what remained of their political clout and thus were unable to resist the demands of the politicians. The second paradox was Karamanlis's slow response in cleansing the military from the junta elements. Although the army was politically very weak at the time, Karamalis proceeded with great caution in eliminating junta supporters still remaining within the military. The second paradox can be explained by the fact that at the time, due to the Cyprus crisis, Karamanlis did not want to proceed with measures that would lower the morale of the army, and thus weaken the military, at a time of crisis with Turkey.

=== Fall of the junta ===
Following the invasion of Cyprus, the dictators ultimately abandoned Ioannides and his policies. On 23 July 1974, President Gizikis called a meeting of old guard politicians, including Panagiotis Kanellopoulos, Spyros Markezinis, Stephanos Stephanopoulos, and Evangelos Averoff. The heads of the armed forces also participated in the meeting. The agenda was to appoint a national unity government with the mandate to lead the country to elections and at the same time to honourably extricate Greece from an armed confrontation with Turkey. Gizikis proposed, at first, that the key ministries of Defence, Public Order, and the Interior be controlled by the military; however, this idea was summarily rejected.

Former Prime Minister Panagiotis Kanellopoulos was originally suggested as the head of the new interim government. He was the legitimate Prime Minister originally deposed by the dictatorship and a distinguished veteran politician who had repeatedly criticised Papadopoulos and his successor. Raging battles were still taking place in Cyprus' north and Greece's border with Turkey in Western Thrace was tense when Greeks took to the streets in all the major cities, celebrating the junta's decision to relinquish power before the war in Cyprus could spill all over the Aegean.

After all the politicians left without reaching a consensus, Evangelos Averoff remained in the meeting room. He telephoned Karamanlis in Paris to appraise him of the developments and urge him to return to Greece, and, following the call, further engaged Gizikis. He insisted that Constantine Karamanlis—prime minister of Greece from 1955 to 1963—was the only political personality who could lead a successful transition government, taking into consideration the new circumstances and dangers both inside and outside the country. Gizikis and the heads of the armed forces initially expressed reservations, but ultimately became convinced by Averoff's arguments. Admiral Arapakis was the first among the participating military leaders to express his support for Karamanlis. After Averoff's decisive intervention, Gizikis phoned Karamanlis at his Paris apartment and begged for his return. Karamanlis initially hesitated, but Gizikis pledged to him that the military would no longer interfere in the political affairs of Greece. Other junta members joined Gizikis in his pledge.

Throughout his stay in France, Karamanlis was a thorn at the side of the junta because he possessed the credibility and popularity they lacked both in Greece and abroad and he also criticised them often.

Upon news of his impending arrival cheering Athenian crowds took to the streets chanting: "Here he comes! Here he comes!" (Note: Έρχεται! Έρχεται!, Érchetai! Érchetai!) Similar celebrations broke out all over Greece. Tens of thousands of Athenians went to the airport to greet him.

=== Karamanlis sworn in ===
1974 swearing-in ceremony of Konstantinos Karamanlis
- Date: 24 July 1974 at 4 a.m. (GMT+3)
- Location: Athens
- Participants: Konstantinos Karamanlis, Prime Minister of Greece — Assuming office; Archbishop Seraphim of Athens — Administering oath

On 23 July 1974 Karamanlis returned to Athens on the French President's Mystère 20 jet made available to him by President Valéry Giscard d'Estaing, a close personal friend. At 4 a.m. on 24 July 1974, Karamanlis was sworn-in as Prime Minister by Archbishop Seraphim of Athens, with Gizikis attending the ceremony. Subsequently, Gizikis remained temporarily in power for legal continuity reasons.

Despite being faced with an unstable political situation, which forced him to sleep aboard a yacht watched over by a naval destroyer for several weeks after his return, Karamanlis moved swiftly to defuse the tension between Greece and Turkey, which came on the brink of war over the Cyprus crisis, and begin the process of transition from military rule to a pluralist democracy.

== Metapolitefsi ==
=== Strategy of democratisation ===
The events that led to metapolitefsi and the traditional weaknesses of the Greek political and social institutions were not conducive to a comprehensive strategy towards democracy. The civil society was not prepared to articulate a transition strategy "from below" and the groups of resistance were fragmented, despite their political glamor. Therefore the transition process became a "from above" project, whose weight had to fall on the shoulders of Karamanlis.

Karamanlis first legalised the Communist Party of Greece that was constantly demonised by the junta, using this political move as a differentiator between the junta rigidity on the matter that betrayed its totalitarianism and his own realpolitik approach honed by years of practicing democracy. The legalization of the Communist Party was also meant as a gesture of political inclusionism and rapprochement. Simultaneously, Karamanlis freed all political prisoners and pardoned all political crimes against the junta. This approach was warmly received by the people, long weary of junta divisive polemics. Following through with his reconciliation theme he also adopted a measured approach to removing collaborators and appointees of the dictatorship from the positions they held in government bureaucracy, and—wanting to officially inaugurate the new democratic era in Greek politics as soon as possible—declared that elections would be held in November 1974, a mere four months after the collapse of the Régime of the Colonels. In addition, Karamanlis wanted to differentiate between the far-right, which was discredited by its association with the junta, and the legitimate political right. The trials of the junta and the subsequent sentences on the principal junta members were a sign that the parliamentary right disapproved of power usurpation by using extra-constitutional methods. At the same time, Karamanlis withdrew from the military portion of NATO and raised questions about the military bases of the United States in Greece, sending a strong signal that Greece's hitherto strongly pro-Western-alliance orientation should not be assumed as a given any longer, and to indicate Greece's displeasure with the inaction of its allies during the Turkish invasion of Cyprus. Karamanlis also signaled the weakening of Greece's dependence on the US by prioritising the ascension of Greece to the European Union, which was frozen during the junta years, and succeeding. His slogan during his campaign to promote Greece's membership in the European Union was: "Greece belongs to the West".

The relatively short duration of the Greek dictatorship compared to its Spanish and Portuguese counterparts facilitated a quick transition to democratic rule. The Cyprus disaster also empowered the democratic forces, including the democratic officers in the Greek army who contributed to the democratisation of the armed forces post-metapolitefsi. Karamanlis's government nullified the 1968 junta constitution and replaced it with the basic law of 1952 modified with the provision that the appointment of military leaders in strategic positions was to be carried out by civilian rule. In the legislative election of November 1974, Karamanlis with his newly formed conservative party (not coincidentally named New Democracy) obtained a massive parliamentary majority and was elected Prime Minister. The elections were soon followed by the 1974 plebiscite on the abolition of the monarchy and the establishment of the Third Hellenic Republic.

In January 1975, the junta members were formally arrested and in early August of the same year the government of Konstantinos Karamanlis brought charges of high treason and mutiny against Georgios Papadopoulos and nineteen other co-conspirators of the military junta. The mass trial, described as "Greece's Nuremberg", took place at the Korydallos Prison under heavy security and was televised. One thousand soldiers armed with submachine guns provided security. The roads leading to the jail were patrolled by tanks. Papadopoulos and Ioannides were sentenced to death for high treason. These sentences were later commuted to life imprisonment by the Karamanlis government. This trial was followed by a second trial which centered around the events of the Athens Polytechnic uprising.

A plan to grant amnesty to the junta principals by the Konstantinos Mitsotakis government in 1990 was cancelled after protests from conservatives, socialists and communists. Papadopoulos died in 1999 after being transferred from Korydallos while Ioannides remained incarcerated until his death in 2010.

The adoption of the Constitution of 1975 by the newly elected Hellenic Parliament solemnised the new era of democratic governance. The parliamentary committee that proposed the draft constitution was presided by Constantine Tsatsos, former minister and close friend of Karamanlis, who served as the first elected President of Greece (after metapolitefsi) from 1975 to 1980.

=== First years after transition ===
Karamanlis's New Democracy went on to win the first post-junta free elections in 1974 with 220 seat out of 300, with Centre Union gaining 60 seats, Andreas Papandreou's Panhellenic Socialist Movement (PASOK) 12, while the United Left entered parliament with 8 seats. Karamanlis's big win in 1974 demonstrated a great change in Greek politics, without giving cause for action to the relatively inactive, but still dangerous junta elements. Three years later, New Democracy's comfortable margin was reduced in the 1977 Greek legislative election, due to an increasing shift in Greek politics toward the left. Karamanlis continued to serve as Prime Minister until 10 May 1980, when he succeeded Tsatsos as President of Greece and then cohabited from 1981 to 1985, with his fierce political opponent and leader of PASOK, the Greek socialist party, prime minister Andreas Papandreou.

The political and social views expounded by PASOK were in antithesis to the center-right policies followed by the conservative government of ND (1974–1981). According to Ino Afentouli, the political expression of the metapolitefsi, namely the coming to power of a conservative leader such as Karamanlis, did not correspond to the changes which had in the meantime befallen Greek society. Thereby, this current often opposed ND's governments, disdained the old centrist political elite expressed by Center Union – New Forces (and its leader Georgios Mavros) and prompted the rise to power of PASOK and Papandreou in the elections of 1981. Since 1974, Papandreou challenged Karamanlis's choices and objected to his dominant role in defining post-1974 democracy, while other political forces of the opposition, such as Center Union – New Forces and EDA occasionally offered him an inconsistent support, especially during 1974–1977.

In the elections of 1981, Papandreou used as slogan the catchword change (αλλαγή, allagí). Some analysts, including Afentouli, regard PASOK's victory under Papandreou as a culmination of the metapolitefsi of 1974, given that the fall of the junta had not been accompanied by the rise of new political powers, but rather by the resumption of power by the old guard politicians.

However, Karamanlis is acknowledged for his successful restoration of democracy and the repair of the two great national schisms by first legalising the communist party and by establishing the system of presidential democracy in Greece. His successful prosecution of the junta during the junta trials and the heavy sentences imposed on the junta principals also sent a message to the army that the era of immunity from constitutional transgressions by the military was over. Karamanlis's policy of European integration is also acknowledged to have ended the paternalistic relation between Greece and the United States.

== See also ==
- Portuguese transition to democracy
- Spanish transition to democracy
