= Socialist Initiative =

Defunct political party in Greece

Socialist Initiative Σοσιαλιστική Πρωτοβουλία
- Founder: Georgios-Alexandros Mangakis
- Founded: 1976
- Dissolved: 1977
- Split from: Centre Union – New Forces
- Ideology: Social democracy Democratic socialism
- Political position: Center-left

Party flag

Socialist Initiative (Greek: Σοσιαλιστική Πρωτοβουλία, Sosialistiki Protovoulia) was a Greek short-lived political party founded in 1976. It consisted of former members of Centre Union – New Forces (EK–ND). Its leaders included professors of law Georgios-Alexandros Mangakis and Dimitris Tsatsos.

In 1977, it participated in Progress and Left Forces Alliance, a coalition of small left-wing parties, and dissolved a few months later. Its members went on to join PASOK or the new democratic socialist party.
