= Stratigos =

Stratigos (Greek: Στρατηγός) is a Greek surname deriving from the Greek title for a general (cf. strategos).

- Simone Stratigo (1733–1824) Greek-Italian mathematician
- Stefanos Stratigos (1926–2006), Greek actor
- Xenophon Stratigos (1869–1927), Greek general
