= 2010 Greek presidential election =

- 3 February 2010
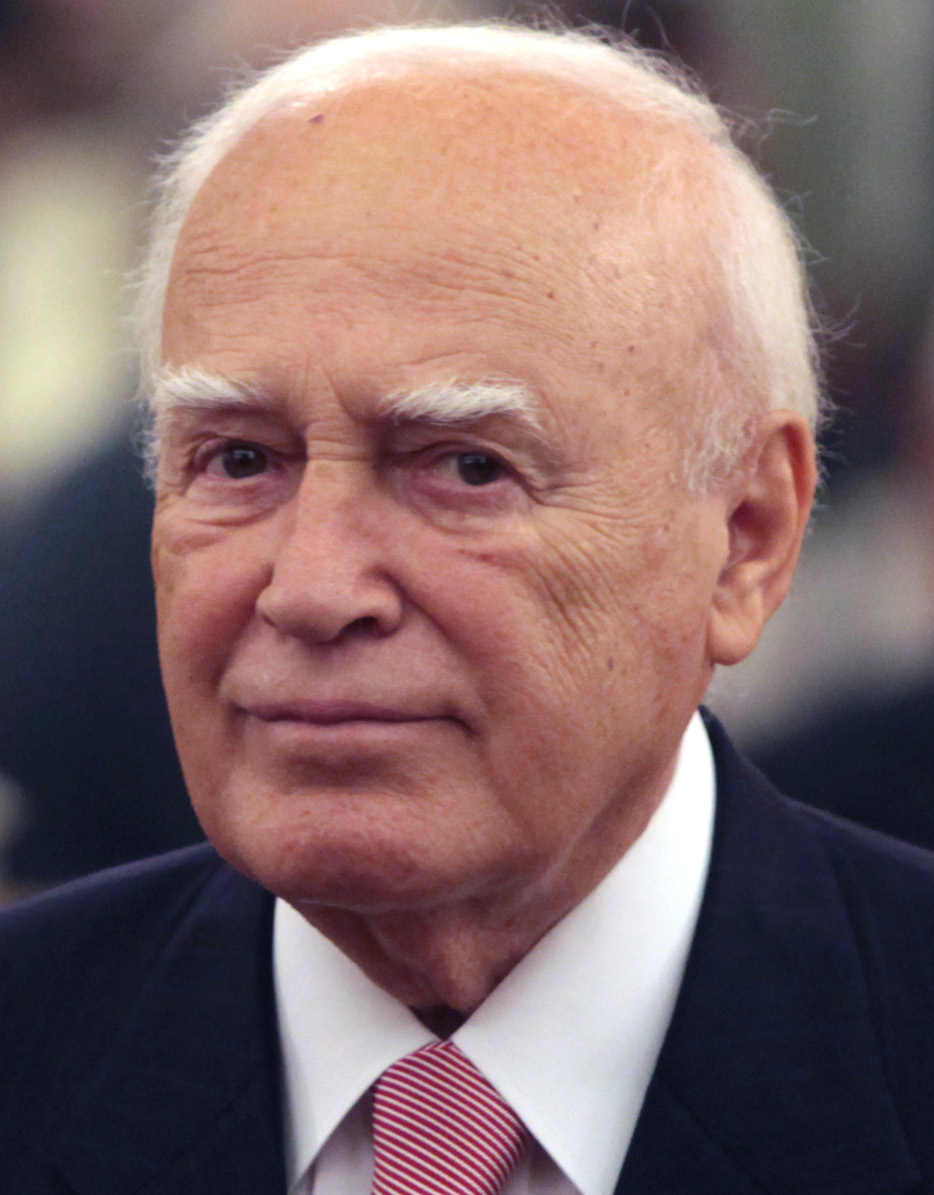
Nominee	Karolos Papoulias
Party	PASOK
Alliance	PASOK, ND, LAOS
Electoral vote	266
President before election
Karolos Papoulias
PASOK
President after election
Karolos Papoulias
PASOK

An indirect presidential election was held in Greece on 3 February 2010. Incumbent President Karolos Papoulias was nominated by the ruling PASOK party (160 seats) and secured the support of the main opposition party, New Democracy (91 seats), as well as that of the smaller LAOS (15 seats). Papoulias stood unopposed and was elected on the first ballot, with 266 votes.

== Results ==
Candidate	Party	First round	
Candidate	Party	Votes	%
Karolos Papoulias	PASOK	266	100
Valids votes		266	89.26
Abstentions		32	10.74
Voters		298	100
Absentees		2	0.66
Total		300	98.34
