= Progress and Left Forces Alliance =

Defunct political party in Greece

Progress and Left Forces Alliance Συμμαχία Προοδευτικών και Αριστερών Δυνάμεων
- Founder: Ilias Iliou
- Founded: 1977
- Dissolved: 1978
- Preceded by: United Left
- Ideology: Democratic socialism Factions: Eurocommunism; Christian socialism
- Political position: Left-wing

Progress and Left Forces Alliance (Greek: Συμμαχία Προοδευτικών και Αριστερών Δυνάμεων) was a coalition of left-wing parties in Greece.

== History ==
The alliance was formed in November 1977 as a coalition of the United Democratic Left, the Communist Party of Greece (Interior), Socialist March, Socialist Initiative and Christian Democracy. The party won two seats in the November 1977 elections, taken by Ilias Iliou and Leonidas Kyrkos, who represented the United Democratic Left and the Communist Party.

Although not formally disbanded, the alliance ceased to exist by mid-1978.
