= Ioanna Tsatsou =

Greek writer (1909–2000)

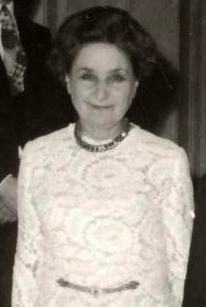
- Tsatsou in March 1976

First Lady of Greece
- In role 19 July 1975 – 10 May 1980
- President: Konstantinos Tsatsos
- Preceded by: Marianna Stasinopoulou
- Succeeded by: Christina Alevra (acting) (1985)

Personal details
- Born: Ioanna Seferiadi; 1904 Smyrna, Ottoman Empire
- Died: 30 September 2000 (aged 96) Athens, Greece
- Spouse: Konstantinos Tsatsos (m. 1930; died 1987)
- Children: 2
- Relatives: Giorgos Seferis, brother
- Occupation: Writer, poet
- Known for: Rescuing Greek Jews during the Holocaust
- Awards: Prix de la langue-française, 1976

Ioanna Tsatsou (Greek: Ιωάννα Τσάτσου), née Seferiadi (1904 – 30 September 2000) was a Greek writer from Smyrna who served as first lady of Greece from 1975-1980. She is recognized as Righteous Among the Nations for her work to save Greek Jews during the Holocaust.

== Early life ==
Tsatsou was born Ioanna Seferiadi (Greek: Ιωάννα Σεφεριάδη) in Smyrna, which is now İzmir, to Despina Seferiadi and Stelios Seferiadis. She had two brothers, Giorgos Seferis and Angelos Seferiadis. Seferiadi spoke both Greek and French from a young age. She and her family were in Athens during the Burning of Smyrna. They never returned to Smyrna. She wrote, "National despair was annihilating us. We had surrendered Greek soil, become fugitives. Greece shrank, shrank, crumpled." Seferiádou stayed in Athens for the rest of her life. Between 1927 and 1937, Seferiádou completed her studies in law and gained a PhD.

== During WWII ==
The Axis Powers occupied Greece in 1941 during WWII. So began the Holocaust in Greece and the attempt to exterminate all Greek Jews, including the ancient Romaniote community and the Greek Sephardim.

Ioanna Tsatsou, who lived in Athens, worked together with Archbishop Damaskinos to protect Jews in her community from the genocide. She assisted Damaskinos in secretly "baptising" Greek Jews so they could obtain identity cards which said they were Christians. The aim of the baptism was not to convert the Jews. The purpose was only to secure false Christian identity cards for them so they would avoid death.

Tsatsou ran a program, created by Archbishop Damaskinos, which provided monetary assistance to the families of Greek men who had been executed or taken hostage while resisting occupation.

On her own, Tsatsou ran a soup kitchen in Plaka which fed over 200 people each day. Many of the people they served were unemployed Jews. Her soup kitchen enabled many to survive the war. She also hid Yolanda Baruh and her parents in her home for months during the occupation.

In 1943, Tsatsou was interrogated by Italian forces who believed that Damaskinos was receiving money from the Middle East. She was unharmed.

Tsatsou wrote a book about her experience during the war, titled The Sword’s Fierce Edge: A Journal of the Occupation of Greece, 1941-1944.

== Writing ==
Tsatsou wrote a number of books in Greek. Many have been translated into English. She also translated some of her works into French, for which she was awarded the Prix de la langue-française in 1976. Her early works focused on the Axis occupation of Greece.

== Personal life ==
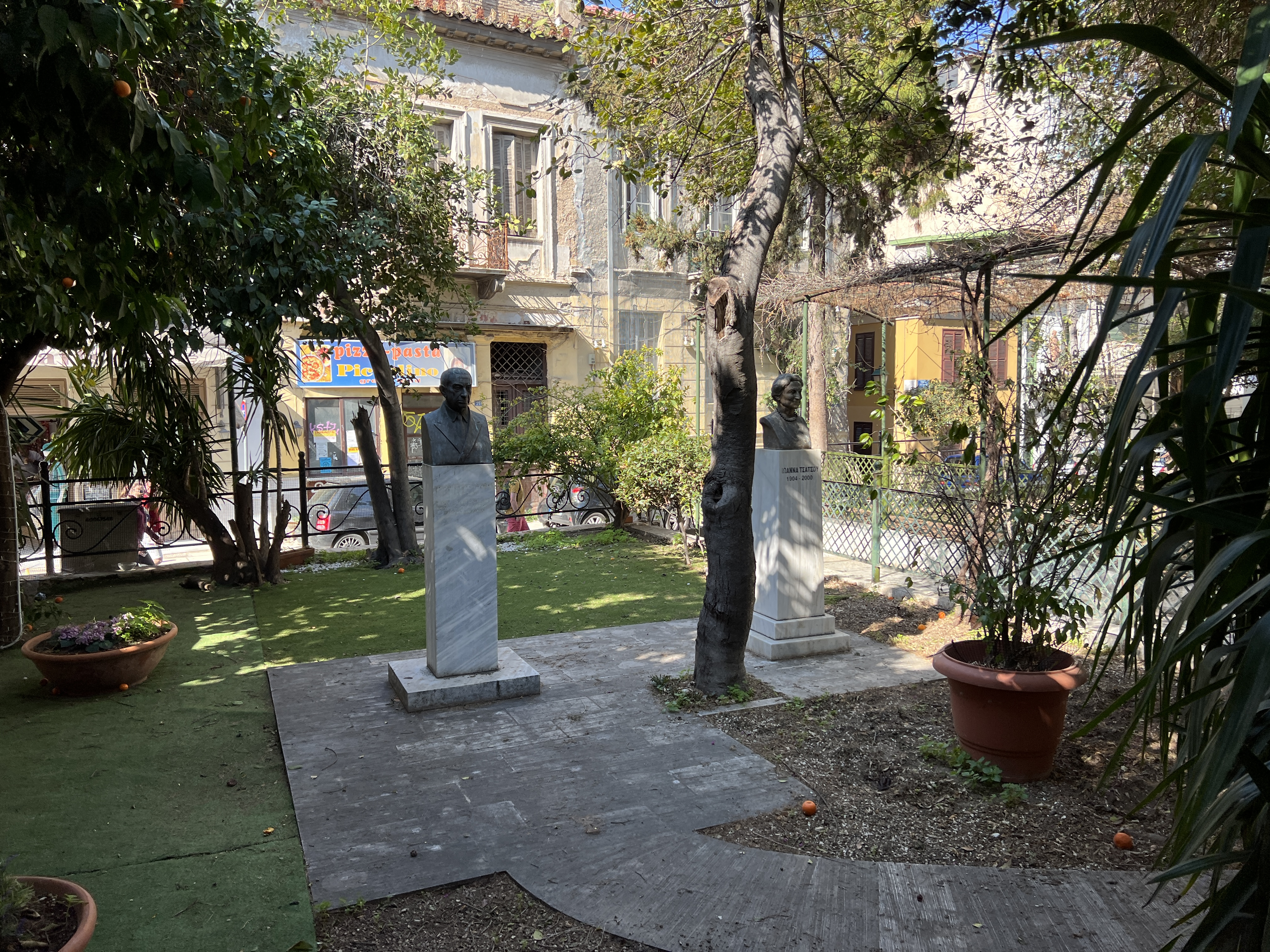
Busts of Ioanna Tsatsou and Konstantinos Tsatsos in Athens

Tsatsou was married to Konstantinos Tsatsos, a president of Greece. Her daughters were Theodora "Dora" Tsatsos-Simeonidi, a dancer, and Despina Mylonas. Konstantinos died in 1987 and Dora in June 2000. She kept up correspondence with her brother Giorgos for most of her life.

Tsatsou died in 2000 at age 96.

== Works ==
- The Executed of the Occupation, 1947
- The Sword’s Fierce Edge: A Journal of the Occupation of Greece, 1941-1944, 1965
- Leaves of the Occupation, 1967
- My Brother George Seferis, 1973
- Debt, 1979
- Hours of Sinai, 1981
- Pierre Emmanuel and Greece, 1989
