= 2005 Greek presidential election =

- 8 February 2005
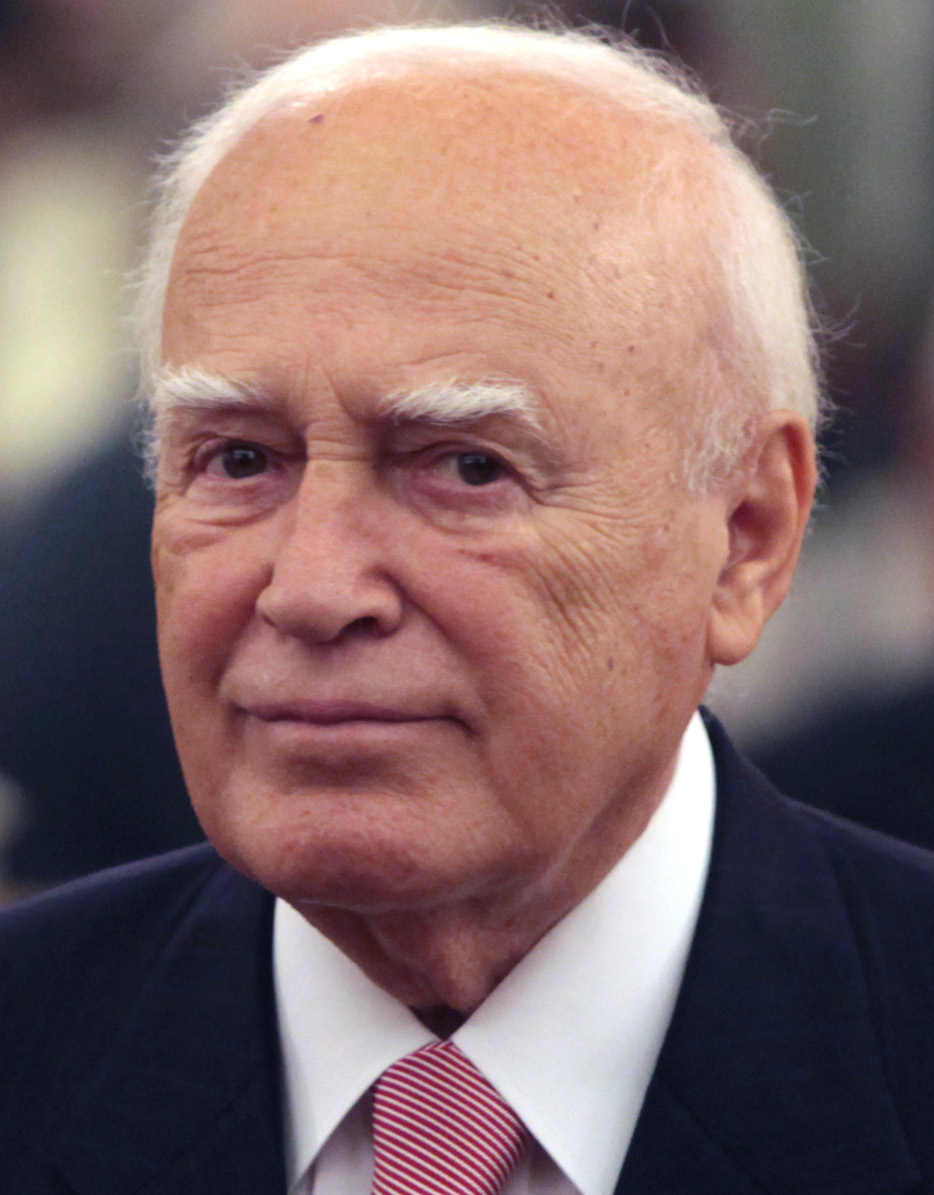
Nominee	Karolos Papoulias
Party	PASOK
Alliance	PASOK, ND
Electoral vote	279
President before election
Konstantinos Stephanopoulos
Independent
President after election
Karolos Papoulias
PASOK

An indirect election for the position of President of the Hellenic Republic was held by the Hellenic Parliament on 8 February 2005.

Running unopposed, veteran PASOK politician and former Foreign Minister of Greece Karolos Papoulias was elected on the first ballot with the record number of 279 votes, with 163 MPs of the ruling New Democracy party, 114 MPs of PASOK and two independent MPs voting in support, four MPs absent, while the 17 MPs of Synaspismos and the Communist Party of Greece voted "present". He was sworn in on 12 March 2005, succeeding Konstantinos Stephanopoulos.

== Results ==
Candidate	Party	First round	
Candidate	Party	Votes	%
Karolos Papoulias	PASOK	279	100
Valids votes		279	94.25
Abstentions		17	5.75
Voters		296	100
Absentees		4	1.33
Total		300	98.67
