= 1974 Greek parliamentary election =

- 17 November 1974

All 300 seats in the Hellenic Parliament 151 seats needed for a majority
- Registered: 6,241,066
- Turnout: 79.53% (▼2.18pp)
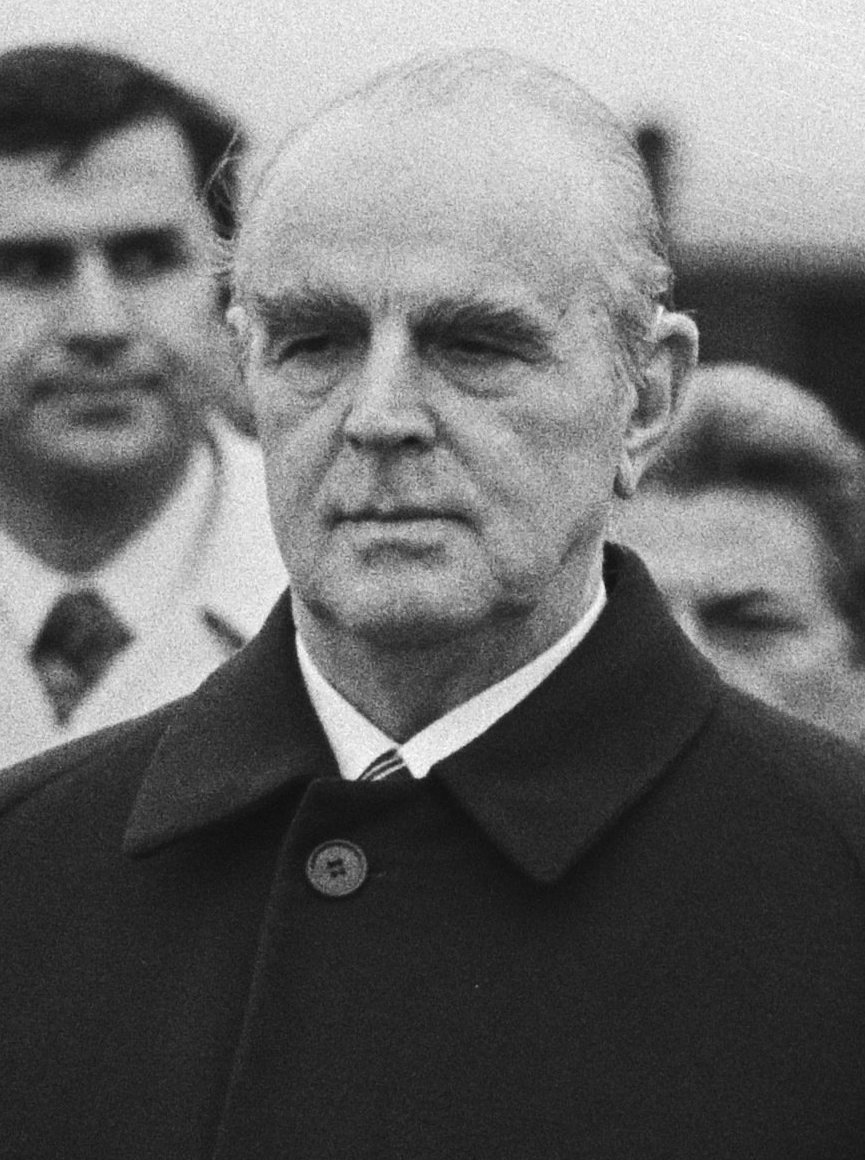

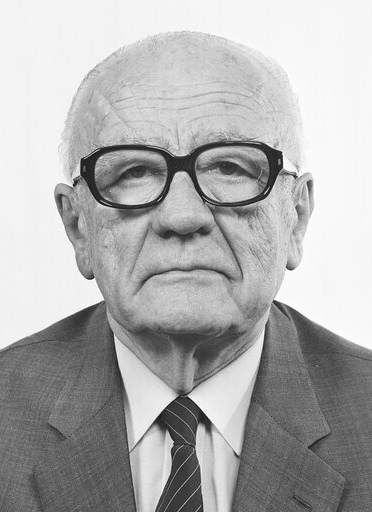

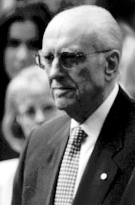
	First party	Second party
Leader	Konstantinos Karamanlis	Georgios Mavros
Party	ND	ΕΚ–ND
Last election	35.26%, 107 seats (Note: ERE)	52.72%, 171 seats
Seats won	220	60
Seat change	▲113	▼111
Popular vote	2,669,133	1,002,559
Percentage	54.37%	20.42%
Swing	▲19.11 pp	▼32.30 pp
	Third party	Fourth party
Leader	Andreas Papandreou	Ilias Iliou
Party	PASOK	EA
Last election	–	11.80%, 22 seats (Note: EDA)
Seats won	12	8
Seat change	New	▼14
Popular vote	666,413	464,787
Percentage	13.58%	9.47%
Swing	New	▼2.33 pp
- Results by constituency
Prime Minister before election
Konstantinos Karamanlis
ND
Prime Minister after election
Konstantinos Karamanlis
ND

Parliamentary elections were held in Greece on 17 November 1974. They were the first after the end of the military junta of 1967–1974, and took place during the metapolitefsi era. The winner was Konstantinos Karamanlis and his newly formed conservative party, New Democracy. Karamanlis had already formed a government of national unity just after the fall of the dictatorship. The second-largest party was the centrist Centre Union – New Forces. The third party in the Parliament became the newly formed PASOK, a radical socialist party led by Andreas Papandreou, son of the former Prime Minister Georgios Papandreou.

== Electoral system ==
The members of the Hellenic Parliament were elected via open list proportional representation in 56 multi-member constituencies using the Hagenbach-Bischoff system.

Additionally, 5% of seats (in this case, 12) were reserved for "state deputies" nominated by the parties, who neither belonged to a particular constituency nor competed for election. These seats were allocated proportionally between the parties.

== Results ==
Party	Votes	%	Seats
New Democracy	2,669,133	54.37	220
Centre Union – New Forces	1,002,559	20.42	60
Panhellenic Socialist Movement	666,413	13.58	12
United Left	464,787	9.47	8
National Democratic Union	52,768	1.07	0
Democratic Centre Union	8,509	0.17	0
Revolutionary Communist Movement	1,539	0.03	0
Liberal Democratic Union–Socialist Party	975	0.02	0
Independents	42,291	0.86	0
Total	4,908,974	100.00	300
Valid votes	4,908,974	98.90	
Invalid/blank votes	54,584	1.10	
Total votes	4,963,558	100.00	
Registered voters/turnout	6,241,066	79.53	
Source: Nohlen & Stöver

=== By constituency ===
Constituency	ND (Note: Compared to ERE)		EK-ND (Note: Compared to EK)		PASOK		EA (Note: Compared to EDA)	
Constituency	%	±	%	±	%	±	%	±
Achaea	52.01	▲19.37	14.29	▼43.55	24.81	New	8.13	▼1.37
Aetolia-Akarnania	59.88	▲22.50	15.52	▼37.48	15.83	New	7.02	▼2.59
Argolis	68.03	▲18.84	12.91	▼37.80	15.63	New	1.93	New
Arkadia	65.15	▲17.14	21.93	▼30.04	9.42	New	2.69	New
Arta	64.70	▲9.57	11.86	▼38.00	15.38	New	4.85	New
Athens A	54.02	▲17.21	20.11	▼25.97	11.68	New	12.73	▼4.25
Athens B	46.58	▲19.67	21.27	▼27.08	13.17	New	17.82	▼6.62
Attica	62.67	▲26.36	17.28	▼37.53	11.94	New	7.08	▼1.78
Boeotia	59.81	▲30.18	15.41	▼54.90	15.57	New	6.20	New
Cephalonia	57.54	▲21.37	22.18	▼41.40	7.75	New	12.12	New
Chalkidiki	66.49	▲21.28	16.46	▼38.32	12.10	New	4.44	New
Chania	15.26	▲6.68	37.91	▼38.69	18.11	New	9.50	▼5.30
Chios	53.19	▲19.06	29.28	▼36.57	10.89	New	5.98	New
Corfu	48.27	▲9.80	18.66	▼26.69	22.49	New	10.09	▼6.06
Corinthia	63.78	▲17.57	14.42	▼39.36	17.96	New	2.87	New
Cyclades	62.91	▲9.32	23.81	▼22.51	10.44	New	2.01	New
Dodecanese	45.35	▲13.61	16.98	▼51.27	21.01	New	2.39	New
Drama	58.57	▲18.46	15.67	▼36.34	17.88	New	4.51	▼3.35
Elis	53.23	▲22.41	27.81	▼41.36	14.78	New	2.60	New
Euboea	58.62	▲19.35	21.91	▼32.47	14.19	New	4.57	▼1.67
Evros	63.97	▲22.05	19.06	▼29.26	11.51	New	4.15	▼5.41
Evrytania	64.28	▲23.19	20.73	▼38.17	13.14	New	1.84	New
Florina	70.63	▲20.46	18.51	▼24.94	5.97	New	4.04	New
Grevena	59.31	▲18.21	21.40	▼26.82	13.47	New	5.39	▼4.94
Heraklion	26.25	▲10.54	38.74	▼35.35	27.80	New	6.97	▼3.22
Imathia	54.92	▲24.15	20.64	▼33.18	15.63	New	8.35	▼7.04
Ioannina	62.02	▲25.33	19.94	▼27.31	9.63	New	7.74	▼5.31
Karditsa	52.55	▲18.42	18.99	▼35.21	13.26	New	8.59	▼3.07
Kastoria	63.39	▲9.11	22.07	▼23.64	4.66	New	1.64	New
Kavala	56.99	▲24.72	17.97	▼32.01	11.54	New	11.63	▼6.11
Kilkis	57.28	▲16.24	15.62	▼25.20	12.09	New	10.46	▼7.66
Kozani	62.32	▲19.13	19.00	▼27.00	12.15	New	5.52	▼4.83
Laconia	76.04	▲12.14	12.92	▼23.16	7.06	New	3.04	New
Larissa	53.66	▲25.78	20.35	▼32.40	13.37	New	11.88	▼7.47
Lasithi	30.25	▲16.68	45.99	▼40.43	20.40	New	2.13	New
Lefkada	46.96	▲12.91	18.22	▼13.30	6.68	New	27.14	▼7.28
Lesbos	42.88	▲26.89	16.77	▼32.67	15.14	New	24.54	▼5.03
Magnesia	51.45	▲23.96	25.22	▼28.28	8.49	New	14.82	▼4.17
Messenia	62.56	▲12.74	17.30	▼26.92	13.54	New	4.44	▼1.51
Pella	60.57	▲25.56	16.26	▼39.81	17.00	New	4.78	▼4.13
Phocis	66.43	▲22.52	18.61	▼37.47	8.49	New	3.79	New
Phthiotis	65.54	▲22.21	20.63	▼35.93	7.76	New	4.53	New
Pieria	63.02	▲23.51	17.34	▼33.03	11.73	New	6.98	▼3.13
Piraeus A	54.29	▲18.99	19.52	▼28.52	12.90	New	12.26	▼4.28
Piraeus B	39.64	▲22.45	24.10	▼24.54	12.38	New	23.14	▼10.69
Preveza	58.97	▲19.24	16.38	▼43.88	17.12	New	5.01	New
Rethymno	35.19	▲20.98	18.64	▼67.14	20.52	New	3.08	New
Rhodope	44.70	▼5.87	39.34	▼10.08	7.61	New	1.62	New
Samos	51.22	▲9.14	24.51	▼12.05	7.21	New	16.37	▼4.97
Serres	66.77	▲24.53	13.30	▼31.64	12.19	New	7.37	▼5.43
Thesprotia	61.66	▲25.13	21.67	▼41.79	14.20	New	2.15	▼1.37
Thessaloniki A	54.50	▲23.14	17.32	▼26.52	10.92	New	15.87	▼8.89
Thessaloniki B	56.94	▲21.29	15.37	▼31.18	14.93	New	11.83	▼5.95
Trikala	53.82	▲24.95	21.20	▼34.89	11.18	New	9.62	▼5.41
Xanthi	52.57	▲17.19	23.64	▼37.22	8.23	New	1.95	New
Zakynthos	53.14	▲10.80	33.05	▼24.60	4.85	New	7.87	New

=== Seat allocation with the current system ===
The seat allocation for the 1974 election was done using the 1974-1985 system, which was notorious for greatly favouring only parties that had received more than 17% of the public vote. As a result, PASOK and EA received only 12 and 8 seats, despite receiving 13.5% and 9.5% of the public vote respectively. The seat allocation by region using the system used from 2007 onwards is presented below.

Region	ND		EK-ND		PASOK		EA	
Region	S	±	S	±	S	±	S	±
Attica	39	▼4	14	▼2	8	▲2	11	▲4
Central Greece	14	▼3	4	▲1	2	▲2	–	0
Central Macedonia	29	▼7	7	▲1	4	▲3	4	▲3
Crete	6	0	4	▼5	5	▲4	1	▲1
Eastern Macedonia and Thrace	14	▼1	3	▼1	1	▲1	1	▲1
Epirus	8	▼3	2	▲1	2	▲2	–	0
Ionian Islands	4	▼3	2	▲2	1	▲1	–	0
North Aegean	5	▼2	2	▲1	–	0	1	▲1
Peloponnese	18	▼2	2	▼1	3	▲3	–	0
South Aegean	6	0	1	▼1	1	▲1	–	0
Thessaly	16	▼1	4	▼3	2	▲1	3	▲3
Western Greece	15	▼1	3	▼2	4	▲1	2	▲2
Western Macedonia	8	▼2	2	▲2	–	0	–	0
Greece	7	▼2	2	▼1	2	▲2	1	▲1
Total	189	▼31	52	▼8	35	▲23	24	▲16

== Aftermath ==
These were the priorities of the Karamanlis's government:

- The adoption of a new constitution
- The abolition of the monarchy after a free referendum
- The submission of a new application for Greece to join the European Community.

The new government decided on a referendum on retaining the republic, which was held on 8 December 1974.

In 1975 Konstantinos Tsatsos, a close friend of Karamanlis, was elected President of the Republic by parliament.
