= Monarchy of Greece =

King of the Hellenes
- Βασιλεὺς τῶν Ἑλλήνων (since George I); Βασιλεὺς τῆς Ἑλλάδος (Otto)
- Coat of arms of Greece

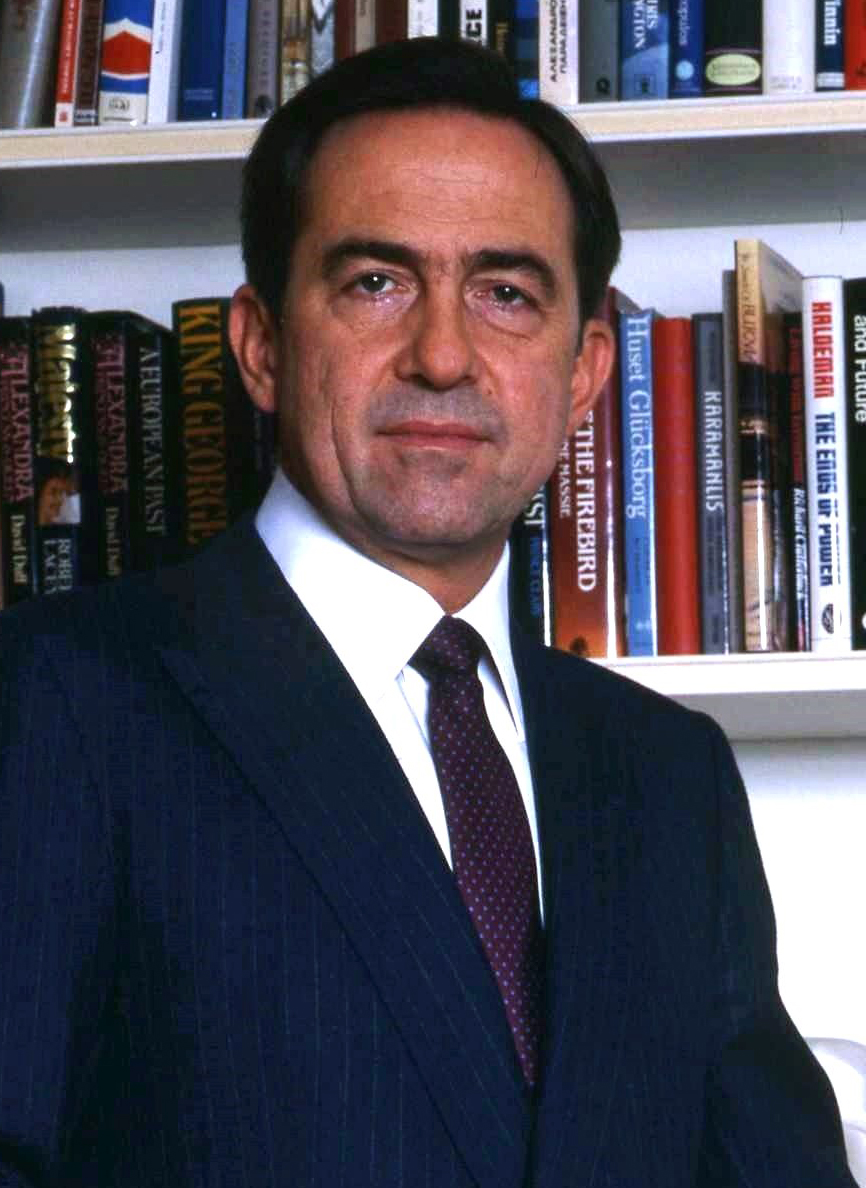
- Last to reign Constantine II; 6 March 1964 – 1 June 1973

Details
- Style: His Majesty
- First monarch: Otto
- Last monarch: Constantine II
- Formed: 27 May 1832
- Abolished: 1 June 1973
- Residences: New Royal Palace; (after 1897); Old Royal Palace; (before 1897)
- Pretender: Pavlos
- Website: greekroyalfamily.gr

The Monarchy of Greece (Greek: Μοναρχία της Ελλάδας, romanized: Monarchía tis Elládas) or Greek monarchy (Greek: Ελληνική Μοναρχία, romanized: Ellinikí Monarchía) was the form of government used by the Kingdom of Greece, under which a hereditary sovereign (Basileus) reigned as the head of state of Greece. Greece was led by a monarchy from 1832 to 1924 and from 1935 to 1973.

== History ==
The monarchy of Greece was created by the London Conference of 1832 at which the Hellenic State became a Kingdom. The Greek crown was originally offered to Prince Leopold of Saxe-Coburg and Gotha but he declined, later being elected the king of the Belgians.

In 1832, Prince Otto of Bavaria of the House of Wittelsbach was styled "His Majesty Otto I, King of Greece", over which he reigned for 30 years until he was deposed in 1862. After Otto's deposition as king, the crown was offered to many others.

A head of state referendum was held in 1862 to name a new king. The vast majority of Greek people wanted Prince Alfred, Duke of Edinburgh, to be their new king. He won the referendum by 230,016 against the Duke of Leuchtenberg. Alfred declined to be king, and so did every candidate until Prince Vilhelm of Denmark of the House of Glücksburg, who had received only six votes. Vilhelm was elected unanimously by the Greek Assembly, and became "His Majesty George I, King of the Hellenes".

There was a referendum in 1920 to restore Constantine I as monarch, but four years later the Second Hellenic Republic was established and the monarchy was abolished following a referendum in 1924. Then in 1935 the monarchy was restored after a referendum and maintained after a referendum in 1946.

In July 1973 the Greek military junta called a referendum, which abolished the monarchy for the second time in Greek history. Then in 1974, the democratically elected prime minister, Konstantinos Karamanlis, called a referendum which legitimately confirmed the abolition.

== Residences ==
Tatoi was the private residence and 10,000-acre estate outside of Athens originally bought by King George I in the 1870s. The property was seized by the Republic following the 1974 referendum and has long been a contentious issue between the former royal family and the Greek state.

The Old Royal Palace (Greek: Παλαιά Ανάκτορα, romanized: Palaiá Anáktora) is the first royal palace of modern Greece, completed in 1843. It has housed the Hellenic Parliament since 1934. The Old Palace is situated at the heart of modern Athens, facing onto Syntagma Square.

== Insignia ==
Monogram of Otto

Monogram of George I

Monogram of Constantine I

Monogram of Alexander

Monogram of George II

Monogram of Paul

Monogram of Constantine II

== See also ==
- Basileus
- Greek crown jewels
- Greek royal family
- List of heads of state of Greece
- List of heirs to the Greek throne
