= Michail Stasinopoulos =

Greek jurist and politician (1903–2002)

- Μιχαήλ Στασινόπουλος
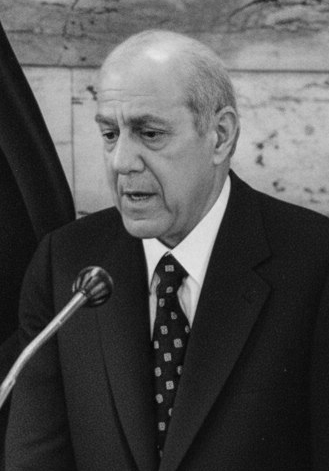
- Stasinopoulos in 1974

President of Greece
- In office 18 December 1974 – 19 July 1975
- Prime Minister: Konstantinos Karamanlis
- Preceded by: Phaedon Gizikis
- Succeeded by: Konstantinos Tsatsos

Personal details
- Born: 27 July 1903 Kalamata, Kingdom of Greece
- Died: 31 October 2002 (aged 99) Athens, Greece
- Party: New Democracy
- Education: University of Athens

Michail Stasinopoulos (Greek: Μιχαήλ Στασινόπουλος; 27 July 1903 – 31 October 2002) was a Greek jurist and politician who served as the President of Greece from 18 December 1974 to 19 July 1975. A member of New Democracy, he was the first officeholder under the Third Hellenic Republic.

== Biography ==
He studied law at the National and Kapodistrian University of Athens and was awarded a Ph.D. in law in 1934. In 1937 he was appointed associate professor of Administrative Law at Athens University and in 1943 became a professor at the Panteion University, where he served as rector from 1951 to 1958.

From 1951 to 1953, he was President of the Hellenic Broadcasting Corporation. In 1952 he served as caretaker Minister to the Prime Minister's Office and Labour Minister in the caretaker government of Dimitrios Kiousopoulos and in 1958 he was Minister for the Presidency in the caretaker government of Konstantinos Georgakopoulos. In 1959, he was accepted into the Council of State, having come first in the entrance examination, and served as President of this body between 1966 and 1969.

In the 1974 Greek legislative election, Stasinopoulos became a Member of Parliament in the nationwide ticket of the New Democracy party. When a referendum (8 December 1974) established Greece as a Republic, Stasinopoulos was elected as President of the Republic by a majority in the Hellenic Parliament. He served as Head of State from 18 December 1974 until 19 July 1975, that is, until the finalization of the new political institutions by the revisionary national assembly through the promulgation of the new Constitution of Greece. Michail Stasinopoulos died on 31 October 2002, aged 99.

== Writings ==
Stasinopoulos was a prolific writer. His literary work first appeared in the magazine "The Muse" (1920-1923). He published many scientific articles and literary works, as well as translations of French poetry and prose. In 1968 he was elected to the Athens Academy as a full member and in 1969 and 1970 he was put forward by the President of the French Council of State, René Cassin, as a candidate for the Nobel Peace Prize.

Legal offices
Preceded by Charilaos Mitrelias	President of the Council of State; 1966–1969	Succeeded by Alexandros Dimitsas
Political offices
Preceded by Phaedon Gizikis	President of Greece; 1974–1975	Succeeded by Konstantinos Tsatsos
