= 1973 Greek republic referendum =

Vote abolishing the Greek monarchy

- 29 July 1973

Results
Choice	Votes	%
Yes	3,843,318	78.57%
No	1,048,308	21.43%
Valid votes	4,891,626	98.70%
Invalid or blank votes	64,293	1.30%
Total votes	4,955,919	100.00%
Registered voters/turnout	6,610,094	74.98%

Illuminated "YES" sign on Mount Lycabettus, installed by the junta as part of its all-pervasive "YES" campaign before the referendum

A constitutional referendum was held in Greece on 29 July 1973. The amendments would confirm the abolition (on 1 June) of the monarchy by the military junta and establish a republic. The proposal was approved by 78.6% of voters with a turnout of 75%.

== Background ==
The military junta had ruled Greece since a group of middle-ranking officers, under the leadership of Colonel Georgios Papadopoulos, staged a coup on 21 April 1967. King Constantine II reluctantly endorsed the coup, but started preparing for a counter-coup by elements of the armed forces loyal to him. This counter-coup was launched on 13 December 1967 and failed, forcing the king and most of the royal family to flee to Italy. Greece remained a kingdom, with the king's functions exercised by a junta-appointed regent without sanction from the king, a post held until 1972 by General Georgios Zoitakis, and then assumed by an increasingly dominant Papadopoulos, who also held the position of prime minister and several ministerial posts.

In May 1973, a wide-ranging anti-junta movement was discovered among the ranks of the mostly royalist Navy and suppressed just before its outbreak. One ship, the destroyer Velos, successfully mutinied. Upon reaching Italy, Captain Nikolaos Pappas and 31 officers and crew disembarked and asked for political asylum, garnering worldwide interest. The failed Navy revolt demonstrated that even after six years of junta "normality," the opposition had not died off, and that it existed even amongst large parts of the armed forces, which were the regime's main internal supporter. This revelation created a major crisis for the junta leadership.

In a move which would bolster his own authority, Papadopoulos sought to depose the king. On 1 June, a Constituent Act was proclaimed, which declared Greece a presidential republic, with Papadopoulos as president. The act was to be confirmed by a plebiscite held on 29 July 1973.

== Campaign ==
Defunct political parties and their leaders urged for a "No" as a sign of opposition to the regime, but the vote was tightly controlled by the junta, and the results were predictably favourable to the regime, as the process did not involve electoral catalogues.

== Results ==
Choice	Votes	%
For	3,843,318	78.57
Against	1,048,308	21.43
Total	4,891,626	100.00
Valid votes	4,891,626	98.70
Invalid/blank votes	64,293	1.30
Total votes	4,955,919	100.00
Registered voters/turnout	6,610,094	74.98
Source: Nohlen & Stöver

== Aftermath ==
Papadopoulos promised a return to democratic and parliamentary rule, based on the provisions of the new Constitution, and appointed Spyros Markezinis as Prime Minister, and he called elections for 10 February 1974. His attempt at controlled democratisation failed after the Athens Polytechnic uprising and the hardliners' coup under Dimitrios Ioannidis that followed. The forms of the Republic were maintained until the final collapse of the junta in July 1974 and the transitional period that followed (i.e. monarchy was not restored), and on 8 December 1974, another referendum was held, in which the Greek people confirmed the abolition of the monarchy, and the establishment of the current Third Hellenic Republic.
