= United Left (Greece) =

United Left Ενωμένη Αριστερά Enomeni Aristera
- Leader: Ilias Iliou
- Founded: 1974
- Dissolved: 1977
- Succeeded by: Progress and Left Forces Alliance
- Ideology: Democratic socialism Factions: Marxism-Leninism; Eurocommunism
- Political position: Left-wing

The United Left (Greek: Ενωμένη Αριστερά, ΕΑ; Enomeni Aristera, EA) was an electoral alliance formed by the Communist Party of Greece, the Communist Party of Greece (Interior) and the United Democratic Left (EDA) to contest the Greek legislative election of 17 November 1974. The alliance received 9.47% of the vote and won eight seats.

== Election results ==
=== Hellenic Parliament ===
Election	Hellenic Parliament					Rank	Government	Leader	
Election	Votes	%	±pp	Seats won	+/−	Rank	Government	Leader	% of seats
1974	464,787	9.5%	New	8 / 300	▲8	#4	Opposition	Ilias Iliou	2.7%
