= National Democratic Union (Greece) =

National Democratic Union Εθνική Δημοκρατική Ένωσις
- Founder: Petros Garoufalias
- Founded: 1974
- Dissolved: 1977
- Ideology: Greek nationalism Royalism; National conservatism
- Political position: Right-wing to far-right

National Democratic Union (Greek: Εθνική Δημοκρατική Ένωσις, ΕΔΕ) was a Greek political party. The party was founded in 1974 by Petros Garoufalias, a former member of the Centre Union. The party was founded in order to represent the royalists and supporters of the recently deposed junta.

It participated in the 1974 Greek legislative election and gained 1.08%. After the electoral failure, the party dissolved.
