= Phaedon Gizikis =

Greek military officer (1917–1999)

- Φαίδων Γκιζίκης
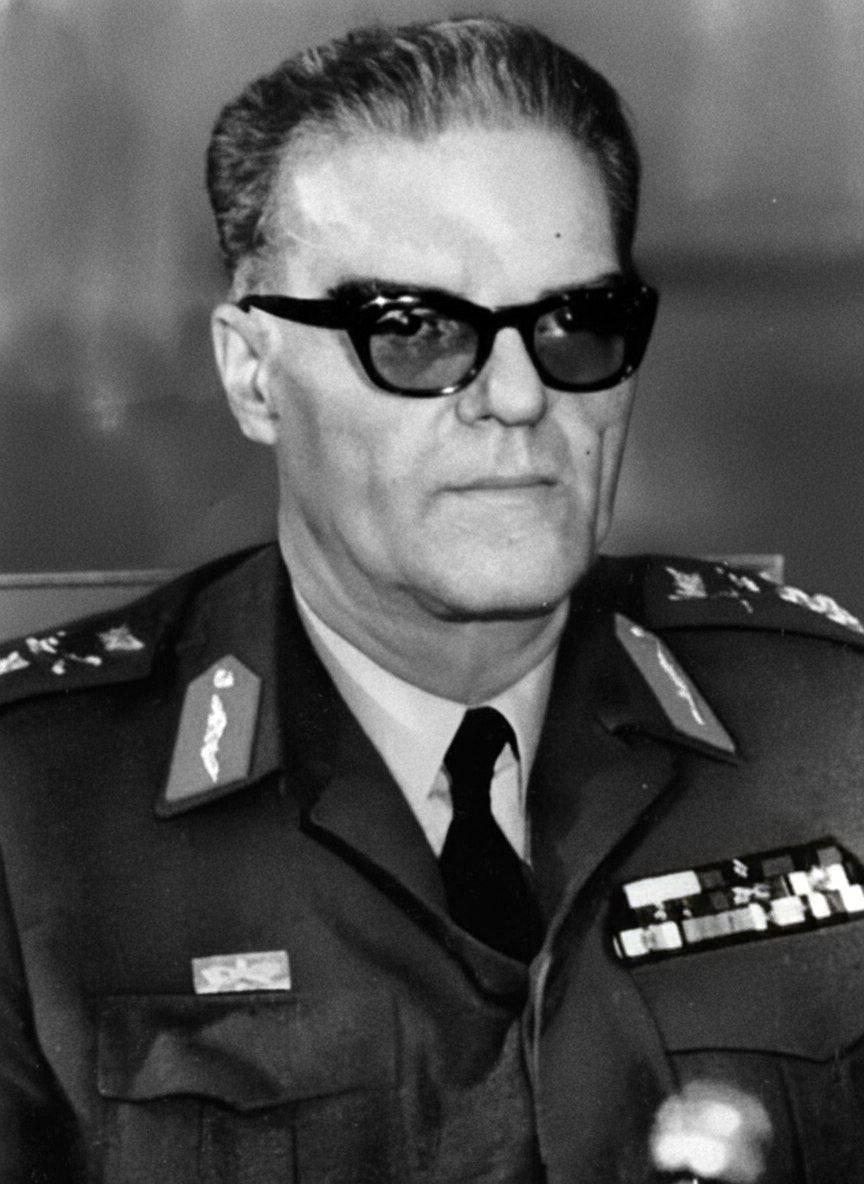
- Gizikis in 1973

President of Greece
- In office 25 November 1973 – 18 December 1974
- Prime Minister: Adamantios Androutsopoulos; Konstantinos Karamanlis
- Preceded by: Georgios Papadopoulos
- Succeeded by: Michail Stasinopoulos

Personal details
- Born: 16 June 1917 Nees Pagases, Kingdom of Greece
- Died: 26 July 1999 (aged 82) NIMTS, Athens, Greece
- Education: Hellenic Military Academy
- Awards: Gold Cross of Valour; Grand Commander of the Order of George I Grand Commander of the Order of the Phoenix; War Cross; Medal of Military Merit

Military service
- Allegiance: Kingdom of Greece; Greek junta
- Branch/service: Hellenic Army
- Years of service: 1939–1974
- Rank: General
- Battles/wars: World War II: Greco-Italian War; Battle of Greece; Greek Civil War; 1967 Greek coup d'état

Phaedon Gizikis (Greek: Φαίδων Γκιζίκης [ˈfeðon ɟiˈzicis]; 16 June 1917 – 26 July 1999) was a Greek army general who was the last President of Greece under the junta from 1973 to 1974.

== Early life and military career ==
Phaedon Gizikis was born on 16 June 1917 in Nees Pagases. Gizikis was a career Hellenic Army officer. His service number was 21756. He graduated from the Hellenic Military Academy in 1939, achieving the rank of second lieutenant in artillery, and participated in the Greco-Italian War and the Greek Civil War. In 1967, he supported the Georgios Papadopoulos coup d'état and received a number of senior military posts during the dictatorship that followed.

== Later life ==
He was given the title of President of the Republic on 25 November 1973, after Papadopoulos was ousted by Dimitrios Ioannidis as head of the regime in an internal power struggle. Three days later, he was promoted to full General (Strategos), a decision he signed himself. While serving as president, following the supported coup in Cyprus, he would detract from open confrontation with Turkish forces during the invasion of Cyprus. Ioannidis would later blame Gizikis and other hesitant leaders as the reason for the Greek loss. As president he gave the task of forming a new government, following the collapse of the Junta, to Constantine Karamanlis. After the fall of the dictatorship in 1974, he retained his post for four months pro tempore, until a new constitution could be enacted during metapolitefsi; he was then replaced by Michail Stasinopoulos.

Gizikis retired from the army in 1974, on the same day he resigned from his position as head of state. In 1976, a military judicial council dropped proceedings against him and 88 other former officers charged with treason and mutiny for collaborating with the former junta.

Gizikis died at NIMTS on 26 July 1999, just one month after his predecessor, Georgios Papadopoulos; he was 82 years old.

Political offices
Preceded by Georgios Papadopoulos	President of Greece; 25 November 1973 – 17 December 1974	Succeeded by Michail Stasinopoulos
