= Centre Union – New Forces =

Former Greek political party

Centre Union – New Forces Ένωσις Κέντρου-Νέες Δυνάμεις
- Leader: Georgios Mavros
- Founder: Georgios Mavros
- Founded: 1974; 52 years ago
- Dissolved: 1976; 50 years ago
- Preceded by: Centre Union
- Succeeded by: Union of the Democratic Centre
- Ideology: Liberalism (Greek); Venizelism; Centrism
- Political position: Centre

Centre Union – New Forces (EK-ND, Greek: Ένωσις Κέντρου-Νέες Δυνάμεις (Ε.Κ. – Ν.Δ.), Enosi Kentrou-Nees Dynameis) was a political party in Greece from 1974 to 1976. It was the continuation of the Centre Union party of George Papandreou after the military junta, and was formed by the merger of a Centre Union fraction led by Georgios Mavros and the Movement of New Political Forces (KNPD).

== History ==
In the elections of 1974, the party became the second largest of the country, after the conservative New Democracy. It obtained about 20% of the vote and 60 seats in the Hellenic Parliament. On February 5, 1976, the Centre Union – New Forces merged into the Union of the Democratic Centre led by veteran centrist politician George Zigdis.

Their program for the elections of 1974 did not differ significantly from that of New Democracy; it included slogans concerning "participatory democracy", "checks imposed on capital (Greek or foreign) by the people", and so on. With the death of the old centrist leader George Papandreou in 1968, who achieved massive support for his centre party Center Union before the coup, and the creation by Andreas Papandreou of socialist PASOK, the old center had lost its appeal to both new and old voters. Also, the abolition of the Greek monarchy in 1974, through a referendum proclaimed by Constantine Karamanlis, deprived the anti-royalist center parties of a popular cause and an issue which had defined their identity.
