= Konstantinos Tsatsos =

Greek politician (1899–1987)

- Κωσταντίνος Τσάτσος
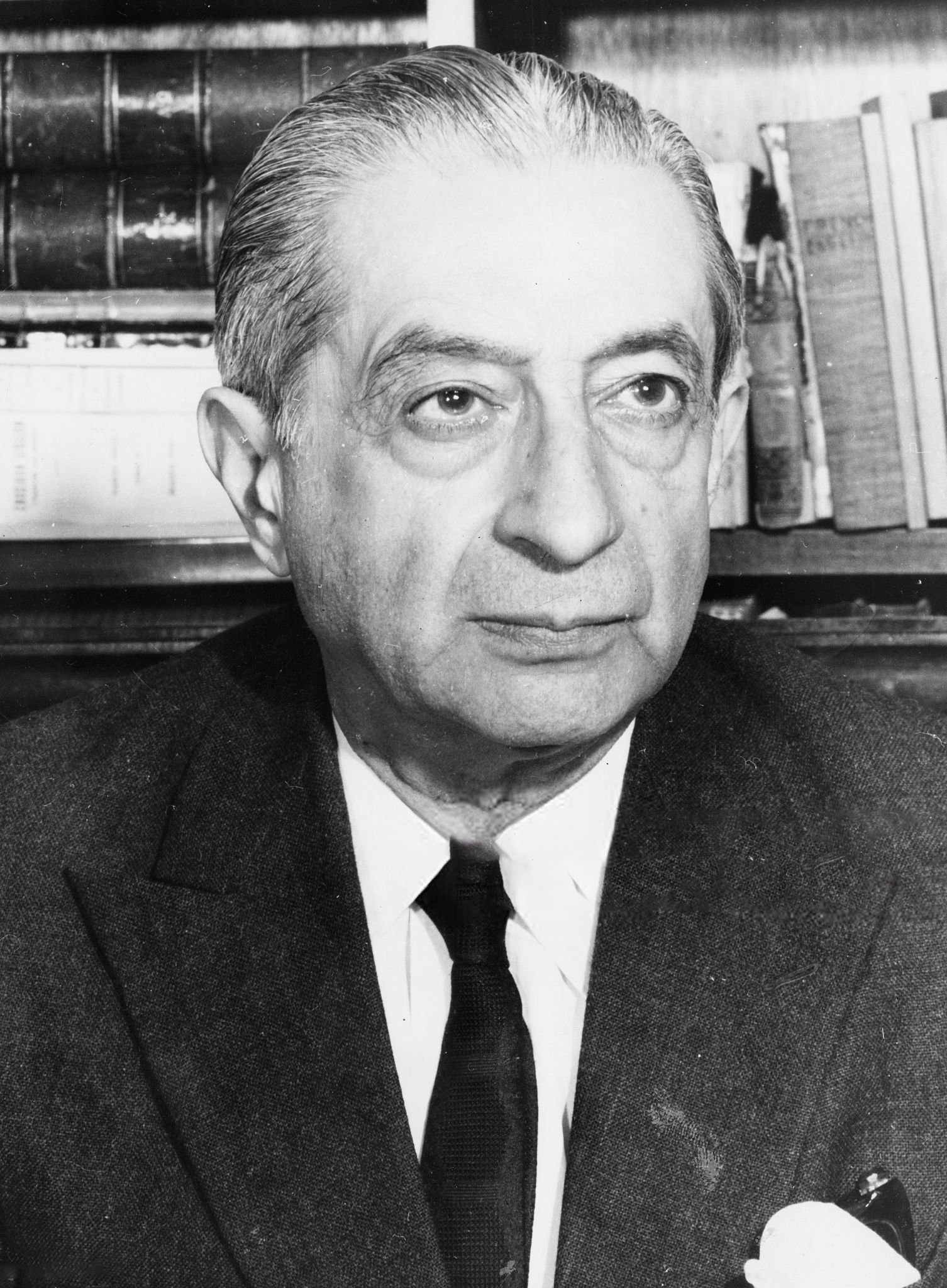
- Tsatsos in c. 1978

President of Greece
- In office 19 July 1975 – 10 May 1980
- Prime Minister: Konstantinos Karamanlis
- Preceded by: Michail Stasinopoulos
- Succeeded by: Konstantinos Karamanlis

Personal details
- Born: 1 July 1899 Athens, Kingdom of Greece
- Died: 8 October 1987 (aged 88) Athens, Greece
- Party: Liberal Party (Before 1955); National Radical Union (1955–1967); Independent (1967–1974); New Democracy (1974–1987)
- Spouse: Ioanna Seferiadi (m. 1930)
- Children: 2
- Education: University of Athens; Heidelberg University

Konstantinos D. Tsatsos (Greek: Κωνσταντίνος (Δημητρίου) Τσάτσος; July 1, 1899 – October 8, 1987) was a Greek diplomat, professor of law, scholar and politician. He served as the second President of the Third Hellenic Republic from 1975 to 1980.

== Life ==
He was born in Athens in 1899. After graduating from the Law School of the National and Kapodistrian University of Athens in 1918 he joined the diplomatic corps. After completing his doctoral studies (1924–1928) in Heidelberg, Weimar Republic Germany, he returned to Greece where he became a professor of law in 1933. In 1940, he was arrested and exiled for opposing the 4th of August Regime under Prime Minister of Greece Ioannis Metaxas. During the Axis occupation of Greece during World War II, Tsatsos participated in the Greek Resistance and then he fled to the Middle East, where the exiled Greek government was seated.

After the end of World War II, in 1945 he returned to Greece and entered politics and became minister for the first time, serving as Interior Minister in the first cabinet of Vice Admiral Petros Voulgaris (8 April – 11 August 1945). In 1946, when he decided to participate more actively in the politics of Greece, he resigned from his post National and Kapodistrian University of Athens and then he became a member of the Liberal Party. After the formation of the National Radical Union by Constantine Karamanlis, in 1955 he became a member of the party and one of the closest colleagues of Karamanlis, although, ideologically, he was a centrist-liberal and not a conservative.

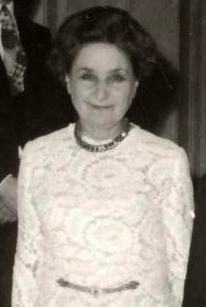
Ioanna Tsatsou, née Seferiadi, wife

He served as a member of parliament and in various ministerial positions until the Greek military junta of 1967–1974. Under the first premiership of Karamanlis (1955–1963) he served for many years as Minister of Public Administration. After the Metapolitefsi in 1974, he was elected again as a member of the Hellenic Parliament and became Minister for Culture. In 1975, he was elected President of the Republic by the parliament. He retired after serving his five-year term. He died in 1987 in Athens. He is buried in the First Cemetery. He was survived by his wife Ioanna, née Seferiadi, the sister of the Nobel laureate poet George Seferis who died in 2000.

== Tsatsos as a scholar ==
Konstantinos Tsatsos served as professor of the philosophy of law from 1933 until 1946 when he entered politics.
Since 1962 he was a member of the Academy of Athens. His vast writing work includes textbooks of legal theory, surveys on philosophy and history, as well as literary works, poems, essays and translations of ancient Greek and Roman classics. In 1974, he presided over the parliamentary commission that submitted the first draft of the new constitution.

== Works ==
=== Writings on legal theory ===
- Der Begriff des positiven Rechtes, Heidelberg: Weiss'sche Universitäts-Buchhandlung, 1928.
- "Society and the Law", in Archive of Philosophy and Positive Sciences (1935) (in Greek).
- "Le Droit et la société", in Droit, Morale, Moeurs: IIe Annuaire de l'Institut International de Philosophie du Droit et de Sociologie Juridique, Paris, 1936.
- The problem of the Sources of Law, Athens: Papadogiannis, 1941 (in Greek).
- Introduction to Legal Science, Athens: Papazisis, 1945 (in Greek).
- "Contract as Legal Rule", in volume for K. Triantafillopoulos, Athens, 1959 (in Greek).
- Studies on the Philosophy of Law, Athens: Ikaros, 1960 (in Greek).
- "Qu'est-ce-que la philosophie du droit?", in: Archives de Philosophie du Droit 7 (1962).
- The Problem of the Interpretation of Law, Athens: Sakkoulas, 1978 (in Greek).

=== Surveys on history and philosophy (translations) ===
- The Social Philosophy of Ancient Greeks, Athens: Estia, 1962 (in Greek).
- Cicero, Athens: Estia, 1968 (in Greek).
- Demosthenes, Athens: Estia, 1975 (in Greek).

=== Essays ===
- The Greek Course, Athens: Estia, 1967.
- Anathemas and meditations, 4 Volumes, Athens: Estia, 1983–1991 (in Greek).
- The Modern World, Athens: Editions of the Friends, 1992 (in Greek).

=== Literary writings ===
- Palamas, Athens: Estia, 1966 (in Greek).
- A Dialogue about poetry - A dialogue with Giorgos Seferis, Athens: Estia, 1975 (in Greek).

Political offices
Preceded by Dimitrios Tsakonas	Minister of Culture and Science; 1974–1975	Succeeded by Ioannis Michail Panagiotopoulos
Preceded by Michail Stasinopoulos	President of Greece; 1975–1980	Succeeded by Konstantinos Karamanlis
