= 2021 in Greece =

- Decades: 2000s; 2010s; 2020s
- See also: Other events of 2021; List of years in Greece

Events in the year 2021 in Greece.

== Incumbents ==
Photo	Post	Name
	President of the Hellenic Republic	Katerina Sakellaropoulou
	Prime Minister of Greece	Kyriakos Mitsotakis
	Speaker of the Hellenic Parliament	Konstantinos Tasoulas
	Adjutant to the President of the Hellenic Republic	Air Force Lieutenant Colonel and Colonel Dimitrios Papadimitriou
	Adjutant to the President of the Hellenic Republic	Navy Lieutenant Commander Kalliopi Poroglou
	Adjutant to the President of the Hellenic Republic	Army Lieutenant Colonel Kyriakos Tzivris (starting August)

== Events ==
- Ongoing: COVID-19 pandemic in Greece
- 12 January: 2021 Evros floods from river overflows cause evacuations, property and road damage, service disruptions, and the death of a firefighter.
- 4 February - March: Anti-government protests against university police, police brutality and mishandling of COVID-19 pandemic and in solidarity with Dimitris Koufontinas' hunger strike.
- 3 March: 2021 Larissa earthquake
- August: Wildfires engulf parts of Athens, the island of Euboea and parts of the Peloponnese.
- 27 September: 2021 Crete earthquake
- 10 October: Storm Athena causes floods and landslides in northern Euboea and Thessaly, damaging homes and infrastructure.
- 13 October: Storm Ballos causes severe floods, heavy rainfall, the first snow of the season in Western Macedonia, school closures, and two deaths before dissipating.
- 4 November: Refugees and migrants protest outside the Eleonas camp in Athens over their living conditions.

=== Scheduled events ===
- The 2021 Population and Housing Census is planned to be conducted by the Hellenic Statistical Authority.

== Deaths ==
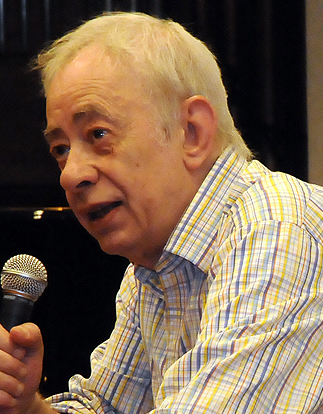
Vassilis Alexakis

- 11 January – Vassilis Alexakis, Greek-born French writer and translator (born 1943).
- 12 January – Theodoros Mitras, politician, MP (born 1948).
- 14 January – Leonidas Pelekanakis, sailor (born 1962).
- 24 January – Sifis Valirakis, politician and anti-junta activist, Minister of Public Order (born 1943).
- ?? February – Maria Kastrisianaki, broadcaster (born 1948).
- 11 February – Antonis Kalogiannis, singer (born 1940).
- 9 April – Giorgos Karaivaz, Star Channel journalist, shot dead in Alimos, South Athens
- 8 July – Giorgos Dalakouras, politician and shipping line owner, former Civil Administrator of Mount Athos (born 1938).
- 2 September - Mikis Theodorakis, musician and composer (born 1925).
