= 1995 in Greece =

- Decades: 1970s; 1980s; 1990s; 2000s; 2010s
- See also: Other events of 1995; List of years in Greece

Events in the year 1995 in Greece.

== Incumbents ==
Photo	Post	Name
	President of the Hellenic Republic	Konstantinos Karamanlis (until 10 March)
	President of the Hellenic Republic	Konstantinos Stephanopoulos (starting 10 March)
	Prime Minister of Greece	Andreas Papandreou
	Speaker of the Hellenic Parliament	Apostolos Kaklamanis
	Adjutant to the President of the Hellenic Republic	Air Force Lieutenant Colonel Ioannis Patsantaras (starting 1995)
	Adjutant to the President of the Hellenic Republic	Navy Vice-Captain Georgios Karamalikis (starting 1995)
	Adjutant to the President of the Hellenic Republic	Army Lieutenant Colonel Ioannis Baltzois (starting 1995)

== Events ==
- 8 March
  - The 1995 presidential election is held. The Hellenic Parliament elects Konstantinos Stephanopoulos as the new President of the Hellenic Republic.
- March 10 – Konstantinos Stephanopoulos was sworn in as President in the Hellenic Parliament and succeeding Konstantinos Karamanlis.
- 13 May – The 6.6 M_{w} Kozani-Grevena earthquake shook the area with a maximum Mercalli intensity of VIII (Severe), injuring 25 and causing $450 million in damage.
- 15 June – The 6.5 M_{w} Aigio earthquake shook the area with a maximum Mercalli intensity of VII (Very strong), killing 26, injuring 290 and causing $660 million in damage.

== Births ==
- 25 July – Maria Sakkari, tennis player
- 15 November – Eleni Doika, rhythmic gymnast
- 15 December – Alexia Kyriazi, rhythmic gymnast

== Deaths ==
- 14 October – Helen Vlachos, journalist (born 1911)
