= 2003 in Greece =

- Decades: 1980s; 1990s; 2000s; 2010s; 2020s
- See also: Other events of 2003; List of years in Greece

Events in the year 2003 in Greece.

== Incumbents ==
Photo	Post	Name
	President of the Hellenic Republic	Konstantinos Stephanopoulos
	Prime Minister of Greece	Costas Simitis
	Speaker of the Hellenic Parliament	Apostolos Kaklamanis
	Adjutant to the President of the Hellenic Republic	Air Force Lieutenant Colonel Georgios Dritsakos
	Adjutant to the President of the Hellenic Republic	Navy Vice Captain Sotiris Charalambopoulos
	Adjutant to the President of the Hellenic Republic	Army Lieutenant Colonel Dimitrios Reskos

== Events ==
=== Undated ===
- My Excuse alternative modern rock band release their first album.

== Deaths ==
- July 6 – Nikos Psyroukis, Greek writer, journalist and historian (b. 1926)
