= 1998 in Greece =

- Decades: 1970s; 1980s; 1990s; 2000s; 2010s
- See also: Other events of 1998; List of years in Greece

Events in Greece during the year 1998.

== Incumbents ==
Photo	Post	Name
	President of the Hellenic Republic	Konstantinos Stephanopoulos
	Prime Minister of Greece	Costas Simitis
	Speaker of the Hellenic Parliament	Apostolos Kaklamanis
	Adjutant to the President of the Hellenic Republic	Air Force Lieutenant Colonel and Colonel Ioannis Patsantaras
	Adjutant to the President of the Hellenic Republic	Navy Vice-Captain Georgios Karamalikis
	Adjutant to the President of the Hellenic Republic	Navy Vice-Captain Demetrios Tsailas (starting 1998)
	Adjutant to the President of the Hellenic Republic	Army Lieutenant Colonel Ioannis Baltzois

== Births ==
- March 18 – Miltiadis Tentoglou, Greek track and field athlete
- August 9 – Panagiotis Retsos, Greek footballer
- August 12 – Stefanos Tsitsipas, Greek tennis player

== Deaths ==
- February 10 – Yorgos Vrasivanopoulos, Greek actor (b. 1924)
- August 8 – Nelly's, Greek female photographer (b. 1899)
