= 1997 in Greece =

- Decades: 1970s; 1980s; 1990s; 2000s; 2010s
- See also: Other events of 1997; List of years in Greece

Events in the year 1997 in Greece.

== Incumbents ==
Photo	Post	Name
	President of the Hellenic Republic	Konstantinos Stephanopoulos
	Prime Minister of Greece	Costas Simitis
	Speaker of the Hellenic Parliament	Apostolos Kaklamanis
	Adjutant to the President of the Hellenic Republic	Air Force Lieutenant Colonel Ioannis Patsantaras
	Adjutant to the President of the Hellenic Republic	Navy Vice-Captain Georgios Karamalikis
	Adjutant to the President of the Hellenic Republic	Army Lieutenant Colonel Ioannis Baltzois

== Events ==
- September 5 – The International Olympic Committee awards the 2004 Summer Olympics to the birthplace Athens (Greece). Athens beating Rome in the fifth and final round of votes 66 to 41.
- An ancient Greek statuette of Terpsichore is discovered during illegal excavations in Dodona, which is then later smuggled out of the country.

== Births ==
- June 12 – Ioanna Anagnostopoulou, rhythmic gymnast
- September 19 – Zoi Kontogianni, rhythmic gymnast
