= 2000 in Greece =

- Decades: 1980s; 1990s; 2000s; 2010s; 2020s
- See also: Other events of 2000; List of years in Greece

Events in the year 2000 in Greece.

== Incumbents ==
Photo	Post	Name
	President of the Hellenic Republic	Konstantinos Stephanopoulos
	Prime Minister of Greece	Costas Simitis
	Speaker of the Hellenic Parliament	Apostolos Kaklamanis
	Adjutant to the President of the Hellenic Republic	Air Force Lieutenant Colonel Konstantinos Prionas
	Adjutant to the President of the Hellenic Republic	Navy Vice-Captain Demetrios Tsailas
	Adjutant to the President of the Hellenic Republic	Army Lieutenant Colonel Ioannis Baltzois (until 2000)
	Adjutant to the President of the Hellenic Republic	Army Lieutenant General Alkiviadis Stefanis (starting 2000)

== Events ==
- 8 February
  - The 2000 presidential election is held. The Hellenic Parliament re-elects Konstantinos Stephanopoulos as President of the Hellenic Republic for a second term.
- 15 May – Gianna Angelopoulos-Daskalaki becomes the President of the Athens Organizing Committee for the Olympic Games, to became the first woman succeed Panagiotis Thomopoulos.
- 26 September - The MS Express Samina collided with the Portes Islets rocks in the Bay of Parikia off the coast of the Greek island of Paros, resulting in the death of 81 people.
- 1 October – At the Closing Ceremony, the Olympic Games are handed over from Sydney to Athens and returned to their birthplace where the they will host the next Olympic Games in Athens 2004.
