= 1999 in Greece =

- Decades: 1970s; 1980s; 1990s; 2000s; 2010s
- See also: Other events of 1999; List of years in Greece

Events in the year 1999 in Greece.

== Incumbents ==
Photo	Post	Name
	President of the Hellenic Republic	Konstantinos Stephanopoulos
	Prime Minister of Greece	Costas Simitis
	Speaker of the Hellenic Parliament	Apostolos Kaklamanis
	Adjutant to the President of the Hellenic Republic	Air Force Colonel Ioannis Patsantaras (until 1999)
	Adjutant to the President of the Hellenic Republic	Air Force Lieutenant Colonel Konstantinos Prionas (starting 1999)
	Adjutant to the President of the Hellenic Republic	Navy Vice-Captain Georgios Karamalikis (until 1999)
	Adjutant to the President of the Hellenic Republic	Navy Vice-Captain Demetrios Tsailas
	Adjutant to the President of the Hellenic Republic	Army Lieutenant Colonel Ioannis Baltzois

== Events ==
- 7 September – The 6.0 M_{w} Athens earthquake shook the area with a maximum Mercalli intensity of IX (Violent), killing 22, injuring 800–1,600 injured, and causing $3–4.2 billion in damage.
- 19–20 November – U.S. President Bill Clinton arrives in the Athens for a visit to Greece and meet President Konstantinos Stephanopoulos and Prime Minister Costas Simitis.
