= 2016 in Greece =

- Decades: 1990s; 2000s; 2010s; 2020s
- See also: Other events of 2016; List of years in Greece

Events in the year 2016 in Greece.

== Incumbents ==
- President: Prokopis Pavlopoulos
- Prime Minister: Alexis Tsipras
- Speaker: Nikos Voutsis

== Events ==
- January 11 – Kyriakos Mitsotakis becomes the leader of the Opposition as he becomes president of New Democracy.

== Deaths ==
=== January ===
- January 6 – Ioannis Petridis, politician (born 1931)
- January 7 – Anna Synodinou, actress and politician (born 1927)

=== November ===
- November 20 – Konstantinos Stephanopoulos, 90, Former Greek President

== Predicted and Scheduled Events ==
=== August ===
- August 5–21 – 51 athletes from Greece will compete at the 2016 Summer Olympics in Rio de Janeiro, Brazil

== See also ==
- Second Cabinet of Alexis Tsipras
