= 2004 in Greece =

- Decades: 1980s; 1990s; 2000s; 2010s; 2020s
- See also: Other events of 2004; List of years in Greece

Events in the year 2004 in Greece.

== Incumbents ==
Photo	Post	Name
	President of the Hellenic Republic	Konstantinos Stephanopoulos
	Prime Minister of Greece	Costas Simitis (until 10 March)
	Prime Minister of Greece	Costas Karamanlis (starting 10 March)
	Speaker of the Hellenic Parliament	Apostolos Kaklamanis (until 19 March)
	Speaker of the Hellenic Parliament	Anna Benaki-Psarouda (starting 19 March)
	Adjutant to the President of the Hellenic Republic	Air Force Lieutenant Colonel and Colonel Georgios Dritsakos
	Adjutant to the President of the Hellenic Republic	Navy Vice-Captain Sotiris Charalambopoulos
	Adjutant to the President of the Hellenic Republic	Army Lieutenant Colonel Dimitrios Reskos

== Events ==
=== March ===
- March 7 – Greek legislative election, 2004, Kostas Karamanlis, nephew of Konstantinos Karamanlis has been elected Prime Minister of Greece defeating George Papandreou.
- March 25 – The Olympic Flame was ignited at Olympia, Greece and it took it across the continents and return to Athens, Greece.

=== April ===
- April 20 – Adjutant to the President of the Hellenic Republic, Air Force Lieutenant Colonel Georgios Dritsakos becomes Colonel.

=== July ===
- July 4 – The Greek national football team won Euro 2004.

=== August ===
- August 13 – Athens host the 2004 Summer Olympics, beginning with the opening ceremony, and making the first city to bring the Olympics back to their birthplace. ATHOC President Gianna Angelopoulos-Daskalaki is the first woman to make a welcome home speech followed by the IOC President Jacques Rogge to make a speech and addressing to the athletes. And the Greek President Konstantinos Stephanopoulos is the first Head of state to open the Games of the XXVIII Olympiad of the modern era. Accompanied by the Adjutant to the President of the Hellenic Republic Colonel Georgios Dritsakos of the Hellenic Air Force.

=== December ===
- December – European Commission issues formal warning after Greece found to have falsified budget deficit data in run-up to joining eurozone.
