= Christoforidou =

Christoforidou is a surname. Notable people with the name include:

- Maria Christoforidou
- Aikaterini Christoforidou
- Lila Christoforidou
