= 1980 in Greece =

- Decades: 1960s; 1970s; 1980s; 1990s; 2000s
- See also: Other events of 1980; List of years in Greece

The following is a list of events that occurred in the year 1980 in Greece.

- preparations to enter the European Economic Community on 1 January 1981 (→ Greece and the European Union)
- On 9th and 10th December, 1980, the Defence Planning Committee of the NATO met in Brussels. Ministers recorded their great satisfaction at the reintegration of the Greek armed forces into the military structure of the NATO.

== Incumbents ==
Photo	Post	Name
	President of the Hellenic Republic	Konstantinos Tsatsos (until May 10)
	Prime Minister of Greece (until May 8) and President of the Hellenic Republic (starting May 10)	Konstantinos Karamanlis
	Prime Minister of Greece	Georgios Rallis (starting May 8)
	Speaker of the Hellenic Parliament	Dimitrios Papaspyrou
	Adjutant to the President of the Hellenic Republic	Spilios Spiliotopoulos (starting 1980)

== Births ==
- 28 February – Kyriaki Papanikolaou, artistic gymnast
- 2 March – Evangelia Sotiriou, rhythmic gymnast
- 23 April – Georgia-Anastasia Tembou, artistic gymnast
- 8 September – Kyriaki Firinidou, artistic gymnast
- 29 October – Vasiliki Tsavdaridou, artistic gymnast
- 27 November – Konstantina Margariti, artistic gymnast
