= 2001 in Greece =

- Decades: 1980s; 1990s; 2000s; 2010s; 2020s
- See also: Other events of 2001; List of years in Greece

Events in the year 2001 in Greece.

== Incumbents ==
| Photo | Post | Name |
|---|---|---|
| | President of the Hellenic Republic | Konstantinos Stephanopoulos |
| | Prime Minister of Greece | Costas Simitis |
| | Speaker of the Hellenic Parliament | Apostolos Kaklamanis |
| | Adjutant to the President of the Hellenic Republic | Air Force Lieutenant Colonel Konstantinos Prionas |
| | Adjutant to the President of the Hellenic Republic | Navy Vice-Captain Demetrios Tsailas |
| | Adjutant to the President of the Hellenic Republic | Army Lieutenant General Alkiviadis Stefanis |

== Events ==
=== January ===
- 1 January - Greece adopted the Euro Currency eventually becoming officially the 12 European country to specifically join the European Union (EU) Eurozone member area country, replacing the Greek drachma in the digital transactions.
