= 1996 in Greece =

- Decades: 1970s; 1980s; 1990s; 2000s; 2010s
- See also: Other events of 1996; List of years in Greece

Events in the year 1996 in Greece.

== Incumbents ==
Photo	Post	Name
	President of the Hellenic Republic	Konstantinos Stephanopoulos
	Prime Minister of Greece	Andreas Papandreou (until 17 January)
	Prime Minister of Greece	Costas Simitis (starting 22 January)
	Speaker of the Hellenic Parliament	Apostolos Kaklamanis
	Adjutant to the President of the Hellenic Republic	Air Force Lieutenant Colonel Ioannis Patsantaras
	Adjutant to the President of the Hellenic Republic	Navy Vice-Captain Georgios Karamalikis
	Adjutant to the President of the Hellenic Republic	Army Lieutenant Colonel Ioannis Baltzois

== Events ==
- 9 May – Greek President Konstantinos Stephanopoulos arrives in the United States for a visit to U.S. President Bill Clinton in Washington, D.C.

== Deaths ==
- 23 June – Andreas Papandreou, Prime Minister of Greece (born 1919)
