= 2002 in Greece =

- Decades: 1980s; 1990s; 2000s; 2010s; 2020s
- See also: Other events of 2002; List of years in Greece

Events in the year 2002 in Greece.

== Incumbents ==
Photo	Post	Name
	President of the Hellenic Republic	Konstantinos Stephanopoulos
	Prime Minister of Greece	Costas Simitis
	Speaker of the Hellenic Parliament	Apostolos Kaklamanis
	Adjutant to the President of the Hellenic Republic	Air Force Lieutenant Colonel and Colonel Konstantinos Prionas (until July 2002)
	Adjutant to the President of the Hellenic Republic	Air Force Lieutenant Colonel Georgios Dritsakos (starting July)
	Adjutant to the President of the Hellenic Republic	Navy Vice-Captain Demetrios Tsailas (until July)
	Adjutant to the President of the Hellenic Republic	Navy Vice-Captain Sotiris Charalambopoulos (starting July)
	Adjutant to the President of the Hellenic Republic	Army Lieutenant General Alkiviadis Stefanis (until July)
	Adjutant to the President of the Hellenic Republic	Army Lieutenant Colonel Dimitrios Reskos (starting July)

== Events ==
=== January ===
- 1 January – The Euro Currency officially became the legal tender for Greece, along with the other European Union (EU) Eurozone member area countries, replacing the Greek drachma by being introduced physically with the official launch of the currency coins and banknotes. Greece entered a period on the same day where specifically both the Euro Currency and the Greek drachma were in dual circulation until exactly 28 February.

=== July ===
- Hellenic Air Force Lieutenant Colonel Georgios Dritsakos, Hellenic Navy Vice Captain Sotiris Charalambopoulos, and Hellenic Army Lieutenant Colonel Dimitrios Reskos becomes Adjutants of His Excellency the President of the Hellenic Republic Konstantinos Stephanopoulos.
