= 1932 in Greece =

- Decades: 1910s; 1920s; 1930s; 1940s; 1950s
- See also: Other events of 1932; List of years in Greece

== Incumbents ==
- President: Alexandros Zaimis
- Prime Minister:
  - until 26 May: Eleftherios Venizelos
  - 26 May-5 June: Alexandros Papanastasiou
  - 5 June-4 November: Eleftherios Venizelos
  - from 4 November: Panagis Tsaldaris

== Events ==
- 25 April – Greece decides to abandon the gold standard.
- 3 June – The government of Greek Prime Minister Alexandros Papanastasiou resigns after one week in office.
- 25 September – The result of the Greek legislative election is an ambivalent one for the two leading parties, the Liberal Party of Eleftherios Venizelos and the People's Party. The People's Party receives a plurality of votes in the Lower House elections, but wins fewer seats than the Liberal Party; the Liberals also win the most seats in the Senate.
- December – The Greek National Socialist Party is founded by George S. Mercouris.

== Births ==
- 21 May – Leonidas Vasilikopoulos, admiral (died 2014)
- 29 August – Lakis Petropoulos, footballer and manager (died 1996)

== Deaths ==
- 13 December – Georgios Jakobides, painter (born 1853)
