= 1994 in Greece =

- Decades: 1970s; 1980s; 1990s; 2000s; 2010s
- See also: Other events of 1994; List of years in Greece

Events in the year 1994 in Greece.

== Incumbents ==
Photo	Post	Name
	President of the Hellenic Republic	Konstantinos Karamanlis
	Prime Minister of Greece	Andreas Papandreou
	Speaker of the Hellenic Parliament	Apostolos Kaklamanis

== Births ==
- 29 January – Marianthi Zafeiriou, rhythmic gymnast
- 29 December – Varvara Filiou, rhythmic gymnast
