= 2005 in Greece =

- Decades: 1980s; 1990s; 2000s; 2010s; 2020s
- See also: Other events of 2005; List of years in Greece

Events in the year 2005 in Greece.

== Incumbents ==
Photo	Post	Name
	President of the Hellenic Republic	Konstantinos Stephanopoulos (until March 12)
	President of the Hellenic Republic	Karolos Papoulias (starting March 12)
	Prime Minister of Greece	Costas Karamanlis
	Speaker of the Hellenic Parliament	Anna Benaki-Psarouda
	Adjutant to the President of the Hellenic Republic	Air Force Colonel Georgios Dritsakos (until August)
	Adjutant to the President of the Hellenic Republic	Navy Vice-Captain Sotiris Charalambopoulos (until August)
	Adjutant to the President of the Hellenic Republic	Navy Vice-Captain Stelios Kostalas (starting August)
	Adjutant to the President of the Hellenic Republic	Army Lieutenant Colonel Dimitrios Reskos (until August)

== Events ==
- 21 May – Helena Paparizou wins the Eurovision Song Contest with the song "My Number One", Greece's first victory in the contest.
- 14 August – Helios Airways Flight 522, a Boeing 737-300 en route from Larnaca to Athens crashed into a mountain near Grammatiko after suffering a loss of cabin pressure, killing all 121 passengers and crew on board.
