= Evangelia Deilaki =

Greek archaeologist and urban planner

Evangelia Protonatariou Deilaki (1931 – 24 July 2002) was a Greek archaeologist and urban planner who was the director of the Ephorate of Antiquities of Argolida in the historic city of Nafplio. She is renowned for her influence on the conservation of the city's appearance, as well as for her extensive excavation work.

== Career ==
She began working as an archaeologist in 1956 after the law Ν.3192/1955 on workplace gender equality was enacted. While director of the Ephorate, Evangelia Deilaki prevented the destruction, alteration and direct or indirect damage to historic buildings of the city by ensuring strict compliance to the planning policy framework and adhering closely to the principles of the Venice Charter. As a result, she often conflicted with local development interests and particularly with the Greek National Tourism Organization, a tool for the Greek junta's scheme for rapid economic growth. Due to her strict implementation of transparency and legality principles, particularly during the 60s and 70s, she was transferred to the Ephorate of Antiquities of Magnesia in Volos in 1973. She continued her academic work until her return to Nafplio in 1977, while also working as an honorary curator in various departments of the Ministry of Culture until her retirement in 1991.

== Legacy ==
Evangelia Deilaki played a crucial role in preserving and maintaining Nafplio's traditional architecture and historic character. The capital of the First Hellenic Republic between 1828 and 1833, Nafplio is famous for its rich array of medieval, Venetian and neoclassical buildings. Its historic centre was designated as a listed site in 1962.

In December 2020, the local Council of Nafplio decided to name after Deilaki a central street leading up to Acronauplia, as a tribute to her contribution to the city's exceptionally well-preserved character.
