= 1984 in Greece =

- Decades: 1960s; 1970s; 1980s; 1990s; 2000s
- See also: Other events of 1984; List of years in Greece

Events in the year 1984 in Greece.

== Incumbents ==
Photo	Post	Name
	President of the Hellenic Republic	Konstantinos Karamanlis
	Prime Minister of Greece	Andreas Papandreou
	Speaker of the Hellenic Parliament	Ioannis Alevras
	Adjutant of the Hellenic Air Force	Spilios Spiliotopoulos

== Births ==
- 4 April – Katerina Khristoforidou, artistic gymnast
- 4 May – Vasiliki Millousi, artistic gymnast
- 10 May – Maria Georgatou, rhythmic gymnast
- 23 August – Evmorfia Dona, rhythmic gymnast

== Deaths ==
- 13 January – Themis Rigas, footballer
- June Georgios Samaras – politician
- 26 August – Loukas Venetoulias, painter
