= 1974 in Greece =

- Decades: 1950s; 1960s; 1970s; 1980s; 1990s
- See also: Other events of 1974; List of years in Greece

The following lists events that happened during 1974 in Greece.

== Incumbents ==
- President: Phaedon Gizikis (until December 18), Michail Stasinopoulos (starting December 18)
- Prime Minister: Adamantios Androutsopoulos (until 24 July), Konstantinos Karamanlis (starting 24 July)

== Events ==
- 8 December: Republic referendum held, resulting in establishing a constitutional republic.

== Births ==
- 8 January - Maria Matsouka, politician
- 1 June – Akis Zikos, footballer and coach
- 11 June – Foteini Varvariotou, artistic gymnast
