= 2017 in Greece =

- Decades: 1990s; 2000s; 2010s; 2020s
- See also: Other events of 2017; List of years in Greece

Events in the year 2017 in Greece.

== Incumbents ==
- President: Prokopis Pavlopoulos
- Prime Minister: Alexis Tsipras

== Events ==
- Michael Skibbe is manager of the Greece National Football team.

=== January ===
- Greek and Turkish warships engaged in a brief standoff over contested Aegean islets, keeping tensions high.
- Greece is given a rating of 35/40 regarding political rights, and a rating of 49/60 regarding civil liberties, by Freedom House.

=== February ===
- 10 February – the Cypriot parliament votes in favour of a bill by National People's Front party (ELAM), for commemorating the 1950 Cypriot enosis referendum (Enosis Union with Greece) in schools every year. The decision was received negatively by Turkish Cypriot politicians.

=== May ===
- 13 May – A train derailment in Adendro killed three people and hits a house.
- 13 May - "This Is Love", performed by Demy, represents Greece in the Eurovision Song Contest.
- 18 May - UPSat is deployed from the International Space Station, making it the first satellite manufactured in Greece to get into orbit.

=== June ===
- 12 June – The 6.3 M_{w} Lesbos earthquake shook the area with a maximum Mercalli intensity of IX (Violent), killing one and injuring ten.

=== July ===
- 21 July – The 6.6 M_{w} Aegean Sea earthquake shook the area with a maximum Mercalli intensity of VII (Very strong), killing two and injuring 480.

=== September ===
- 9 September - The Greek FIBA team reaches the quarterfinals of the FIBA EuroBasket 2017, losing to Russia 69-74 in the process.

=== November ===
- The Greek association football team reaches the playoffs of FIFA World Cup qualification, losing to Croatia 4-1 on aggregate in the process.
- 15 November – In one of the greatest disasters in the area in decades, flash floods hit Western Attica, particularly the Athens suburb of Mandra, killing twenty-three.

=== December ===
- December – Rebetiko, a Greek music genre, is added to UNESCO Intangible Cultural Heritage Lists.

== Deaths ==
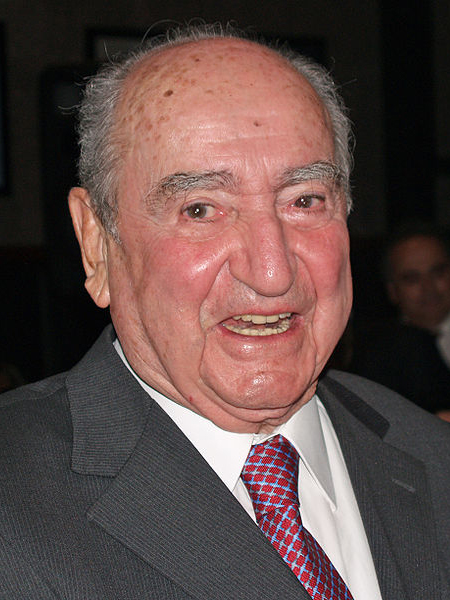
Konstantinos Mitsotakis

- 13 January – Magic Alex, or Yanni Alexis Mardas, electronics engineer (b. 1942).
- 7 February – Konstantinos Despotopoulos, philosopher and politician, MP (b. 1913)
- 17 February – Evangelos Basiakos, politician, MP (b. 1954).
- 29 May – Konstantinos Mitsotakis, former Greek Prime Minister (b. 1918).
- 5 June – Georgios Masadis, footballer (b. 1944)
- 13 November – Yannis Kapsis, journalist and politician, former Deputy Minister of Foreign Affairs (b. 1929).
- 16 December – Angela Kokkola, politician, former MEP (b. 1932).
