= 2020 in Greece =

- Decades: 2000s; 2010s; 2020s
- See also: Other events of 2020; List of years in Greece

Events in the year 2020 in Greece.

== Incumbents ==
Photo	Post	Name
	President of the Hellenic Republic	Prokopis Pavlopoulos (until March 13)
	President of the Hellenic Republic	Katerina Sakellaropoulou (starting March 13)
	Prime Minister of Greece	Kyriakos Mitsotakis
	Speaker of the Hellenic Parliament	Konstantinos Tasoulas
	Adjutant to the President of the Hellenic Republic	Air Force Lieutenant Colonel Dimitrios Papadimitriou
	Adjutant to the President of the Hellenic Republic	Navy Commander Nikolaos Patsakis (until March 13)
	Adjutant to the President of the Hellenic Republic	Navy Lieutenant Commander Kalliopi Poroglou (starting March 13)
	Adjutant to the President of the Hellenic Republic	Army Lieutenant Colonel Stefanos Lykopoulos

== Events ==
Ongoing – COVID-19 pandemic in Greece

=== January ===
- January 3 – The country made official protest along with other countries against Turkey's plans to deploy troops to Libya.
- January 5 – Greece and Israel signed an agreement to build the longest underwater gas pipeline in the world.
- January 15 – Prime Minister Kyriakos Mitsotakis nominated Council of State president Katerina Sakellaropoulou to be President.

=== February ===
- February 3 – Police on the island of Lesbos fired tear gas to disperse migrants and refugees protesting about conditions in the camps and the slow pace of processing asylum requests.
- February 26 – The country confirmed its first COVID-19 case in Thessaloniki.
- February 27 – The country confirmed its second and third cases and cancels all Carnival-related events.
- February 28 – Nearly 300 migrants including Syrians arrived in Edirne province, Turkey, on the country's border in a bid to go to Europe. Another group of migrants arrived on the coast of Ayvacik in Çanakkale, western Turkey, and wanted to go to Lesbos by boats. Turkish officials announced that the security forces will not intervene to prevent the crossing of any migrants, including those from Syria and other countries like Afghanistan and Iran.
- February 29 – Eighty migrants crossed to Aegean Islands Lesbos and Samos overnight after Turkey opens its border with the country.

=== March ===
- March 1 – The country deployed its military on the border with Turkey to prevent thousands of migrants from entering the European Union, and suspends all asylum applications for a month while also vowing to deport any migrants who enter the country illegally.
- March 2 – Hellenic Police border guards opened fire on migrants attempting to illegally enter the country by crossing the border from Turkey, killing a Syrian man. In addition, the Hellenic Army's IV Army Corps announced a 24-hour snap military drill on the border with Turkey, and warns civilians to stay away from the area.
- March 3 – The Turkish interior minister announced that over 130,000 refugees had crossed into the country in the past four days.
- March 10 – Minister of Health Vasilis Kikilias announces that the country's schools and universities will remain closed for two weeks.
- March 12
  - Authorities reported the country's first COVID-19 death, a 66-year-old pilgrim who visited Egypt and Israel last month.
  - The Olympic torch relay began in Olympia without public attendance. A week later on March 19 the Olympic flame was handed over to Japan.
- March 13 – Katerina Sakellaropoulou was sworn in as President in the Hellenic Parliament and became the first woman to hold the office, succeeding Prokopis Pavlopoulos. Amid the COVID-19 pandemic in the country, she suspended the protocol ceremony for the inauguration scheduled for Saturday 14 and no handshakes were allowed.
- March 22 – Prime Minister Kyriakos Mitsotakis ordered a nationwide lockdown starting March 23.

=== April ===
- April 26 – Two separate fires at a refugee camp on Samos left around 100 migrants without shelter, with some moved to Vathy.
- April 29 – A Canadian CH-148 Cyclone helicopter went missing while flying over the Ionian Sea during a NATO mission. One body was recovered, while the five other persons on board remained missing.

=== May ===
- May 14 – NATO Secretary General Jens Stoltenberg said the military alliance is "ready to support" the UN-recognized Government of National Accord resulting in strong criticism from the country, which said his recognition of the "Muslim Brotherhood government" does not reflect the positions of the military alliance.

=== June ===
- June 2 – U.S. Secretary of State Mike Pompeo announced sanctions on four shipping firms, including one based in the country, for transporting oil from Venezuela.

=== July ===
- July 21
  - The country accused Turkey of encroaching on its territorial waters after a NAVTEX was issued by the Turkish Naval Forces for "seismic surveys" off Greek islands in the Mediterranean Sea between Cyprus and Crete from July 21 to August 2.
  - The government placed the Hellenic Armed Forces on high alert after Turkish Air Force fighter jets entered Greek airspace over Strongyli Megistis.

=== August ===
- August 6 – The country signed a bilateral agreement with Egypt which established a new exclusive economic zone (EEZ) in the Eastern Mediterranean between the two countries. The agreement prompted anger from Turkey, with the Turkish Foreign Ministry describing the deal as "null and void".
- August 7 – Turkish President Recep Tayyip Erdoğan announces his country will resume energy exploration activities in the eastern Mediterranean, saying the country had repeatedly violated their agreement on the matter.
- August 9
  - Eight people are dead after floods caused by thunderstorms and torrential rains affected Evia, Greece. Dozens of people have been evacuated from the area.
  - The National Public Health Organization reported 203 new COVID-19 cases in the country in the past 24 hours, which is the highest single day for the country since the pandemic began.
- August 11 – The country imposed a curfew on bars, restaurants, and cafes in several regions following an increase in COVID-19 cases. The curfew lasts from midnight until 7 am local time.
- August 13 – France deployed two Dassault Rafale fighter jets and the frigate La Fayette to the eastern Mediterranean because of tensions between the country and Turkey over oil and gas exploration in disputed waters. French President Emmanuel Macron says the French military will monitor the situation.
- August 14 – The country announced that they would limit public gatherings to 50 people and impose a midnight curfew on bars and restaurants in Athens and other areas. This measure is to last until August 24 in parts of the country where infection numbers have risen.
- August 25 – Manchester United captain and England international Harry Maguire was given a suspended sentence of 21 months and 10 days in prison by a court in the country for repeated bodily harm, attempted bribery of police, violence against public employees and insult, following his arrest on the island of Mykonos.
- August 26
  - The country confirmed 293 new cases in the last 24 hours which is the highest daily spike since the outbreak began in the country. According to National Public Health Organization, 22 of the new cases were reported at the country's entry points.
  - The Turkish Ministry of National Defense revealed that a Barbaros-class frigate of the Turkish Navy and the TCG Burgazada have conducted joint military exercises with the USS Winston S. Churchill of the U.S. Navy in the Eastern Mediterranean, hours after the country conducted similar exercises with France, Italy, and Cyprus in the disputed region.
- August 27 – The Hellenic Parliament formally ratified a maritime agreement with Egypt, that defines maritime boundaries and an exclusive economic zone between the two countries in the Mediterranean Sea.
- August 28
  - The Ministry of Citizen Protection announced changes to the country's travel restrictions, effective August 31 until at least September 19, due to a rise in cases in recent weeks. Changes include requiring visitors from a list of countries to show a negative test result to enter and a suspension of flights to and from Catalonia, Spain, but lifting restrictions on the Netherlands.
  - Top EU diplomat Josep Borrell threatens Turkey with sanctions unless it and the country reconcile their differences over maritime borders and gas drilling rights near Cyprus.
- August 30
  - Turkey demands that the country withdraws its troops from the Aegean island of Kastellorizo, saying it had violated the 1947 peace treaty, which called for the formerly Italian-occupied Kastellorizo to be demilitarized, with a recent troop deployment. The government says the event was a "routine troop rotation".
  - The number of COVID-19 cases in the country reached 10,000.
- August 31 – French Foreign Minister Jean-Yves Le Drian called for a "coordinated European response" to recent Turkish aggression towards the country and Cyprus in the Eastern Mediterranean, saying "Europe needs to leave the age of innocence behind and shape its own destiny."

=== September ===
- September 1 – Due to some spikes in cases, authorities delayed the schools' reopening to September 14 in order to allow time for vacationers to return to big cities to limit the movement of asymptomatic people. Students and teachers are told to wear face masks, which will be handed out for free to both public and private schools.
- September 2 – The country reported the first case in its largest refugee camp, located on the island of Lesbos.
- September 9 – Multiple fires erupted in the Mória Reception & Identification Centre, the country's largest migrant camp, causing widespread destruction. The fires happen shortly after the entire camp was put under quarantine due to the detection of positive COVID-19 cases.
- September 10
  - The country reports 372 new cases in the last 24 hours, its highest daily tally since the start of the pandemic in the country. From those new cases, 114 were due to an outbreak at a food processing plant in the northern part of the country, with 133 recorded in the greater Athens area.
  - French President Emmanuel Macron and German Chancellor Angela Merkel agreed to accept into their respective borders around 400 unaccompanied minors from the Mória Reception & Identification Centre, which had been destroyed by a fire the previous day.
- September 12 – Prime Minister Kyriakos Mitsotakis announced an arms deal with France for the purchase of Dassault Rafale fighter aircraft and FREMM multipurpose frigates, as well as the recruitment of 15,000 additional troops, amid ongoing tension in the eastern Mediterranean.
- September 15 – Germany agreed to take 1,500 migrants from the country following a devastating fire at the Moria Refugee Camp on the island of Lesbos.
- September 19 – A rare Mediterranean tropical-like cyclone (medicane), with winds up to 120 km/h (75 mph), killed three people as it passes over the country heading toward the island of Crete. About 5,000 homes in Karditsa, Greece, were affected by flooding and heavy winds. One person is still reported missing.

=== October ===
- October 7 – A court ruled that far-right political party Golden Dawn operated as a criminal organization in connection with the murder of anti-fascist rapper Pavlos Fyssas in 2013 and other crimes.
- October 28 - In a parasailing accident 2 British teenagers were killed and another one got injured in Rhodes, Greece.

== Deaths ==
=== January ===
- 3 January – Antonis Balomenakis, lawyer and politician, former MP (b. 1954).
- 21 January – Katerina Anghelaki-Rooke, poet and academic (b. 1939).
- 29 January – Yannis Tseklenis, fashion designer (b. 1937).

=== February ===
- 12 February – Nikitas Venizelos, businessman (b. 1930).
- 14 February – Christophoros, Orthodox prelate (b. 1931).

=== March ===
- 2 March – Yannis Katsafados, lawyer politician (b. 1935).
- 13 March – Filippos Petsalnikos, politician (b. 1950).
- 30 March – Manolis Glezos, resistance activist and politician (b. 1922).

=== April ===
- 11 April – Periklis Korovesis, journalist and politician (b. 1941).

=== May ===
- 1 May – Georgios Zaimis, Olympic sailor, gold medalist (b. 1937).

== See also ==
- 2019 European Parliament election
- History of Greece
