= 2018 in Greece =

- Decades: 1990s; 2000s; 2010s; 2020s
- See also: Other events of 2018; List of years in Greece

Events in the year 2018 in Greece.

== Incumbents ==
Photo	Post	Name
	President of the Hellenic Republic	Prokopis Pavlopoulos
	Prime Minister of Greece	Alexis Tsipras
	Speaker of the Hellenic Parliament	Nikos Voutsis
	Adjutant to the President of the Hellenic Republic	Navy Commander Vice Captain Nikolaos Patsakis

== Events ==
- 12 June - The government announces an agreement with the Republic of Macedonia over the Macedonia naming dispute.
- 15 June - At Lake Prespa the agreement with Macedonia to rename the country "North Macedonia" is signed by the Prime ministers of both states.
- 23–26 July - A series of wildfires in Attica lead to the death of dozens of people (100 confirmed deaths as of December). Alexis Tsipras declares three days of national mourning.
- 13 October - At least 11 people die after their vehicle and a lorry collide head-on in Thessaloniki, Greece.
- 28 November - Murder of Eleni Topaloudi by two male assailants on the island of Rhodes, Greece.

== Deaths ==
- 21 May – Vasilis Triantafillidis, comedian (b. 1940)
