= Kaklamanis =

Kaklamanis (Greek: Κακλαμάνης) is a Greek surname. The female version of the name is Kaklamani (Greek: Κακλαμάνη).

Notable people with surname Kaklamanis:

- Apostolos Kaklamanis (born 1936), PASOK politician and speaker of the Hellenic Parliament 1993–2004
- Nikitas Kaklamanis (born 1946), ex-Mayor of Athens
