= 2015 in Greece =

- Decades: 1990s; 2000s; 2010s; 2020s
- See also: Other events of 2015; List of years in Greece

The following lists events that happened during 2015 in Greece.

== Incumbents ==
Photo	Post	Name
	President of the Hellenic Republic	Karolos Papoulias (until March 13)
	President of the Hellenic Republic	Prokopis Pavlopoulos (starting March 13)
	Prime Minister of Greece	Antonis Samaras (until January 26)
	Prime Minister of Greece	Alexis Tsipras (January 26 - August 27; starting September 27)
	Acting Prime Minister of Greece	Vassiliki Thanou (August 27 - September 27)
	Speaker of the Hellenic Parliament	Vangelis Meimarakis (until February 6)
	Speaker of the Hellenic Parliament	Zoi Konstantopoulou (February 6 - October 4)
	Speaker of the Hellenic Parliament	Nikos Voutsis (starting October 4)
	Adjutant of the Hellenic Army	Lazaros Rizopoulos (until 2015)

== Events ==
=== January ===
- January 3 – Former Prime Minister George Papandreou announces the formation of a new party, Movement of Democratic Socialists, threatening to push the long-dominant PASOK under the election threshold.
- January 5 – A Libyan warplane bombs a Greek-operated oil tanker anchored offshore the city of Derna, killing two sailors, one Greek and one Romanian. The Greek government condemned what it called an "unprovoked and cowardly" attack and demanded an investigation and punishment for those responsible.
- January 17 – Greek anti-terror police arrest four people in Athens in alleged relation to the January 15 failed terrorist plot to kill police officers in Belgium.
- January 25 – A legislative election takes place to elect all 300 members to the Hellenic Parliament in accordance with the constitution. The formerly ruling Greek conservatives concede the election. Preliminary results indicate that SYRIZA will fall just short of an absolute majority. Eventually SYRIZA takes 36.34% of the votes.
- January 27 – The First Cabinet of Alexis Tsipras is sworn in (two-party coalition of SYRIZA and ANEL).

=== February ===
- February 11 – The Greek Coast Guard rescues all 22 crewmen from a Cyprus -flagged vessel Good Faith that ran aground on the Greek island of Andros during a storm in the Aegean Sea.
- February 18 – The Hellenic Parliament elects Prokopis Pavlopoulos as the new President of Greece.

=== June ===
- June 11 – NERIT shuts down and is replaced by its predecessor, ERT

=== July ===
- July 5 – A referendum on whether Greece should accept the bailout conditions proposed by the European Commission, the International Monetary Fund and the European Central Bank is held. The bailout conditions are rejected with a majority of 61.31%.
- July 8 – Three days after the referendum the government "formally asked for a three-year bailout from the Eurozone's rescue fund [on 8 July 2015] and pledged to start implementing some economic-policy overhauls" by mid-July 2015. European finance leaders scheduled a "crisis summit" on 12 July to consider the request. The Greek request was a "drastic turnaround" for Prime Minister Tsipras regarding "pension cuts, tax increases and other austerity measures."
- July 13 – the Greek government signs a bailout package including 'worse' terms than the ones rejected via the referendum.

=== August ===
- August 20 – The prime minister Alexis Tsipras resigns.
- August 27 – Vassiliki Thanou is sworn as caretaker prime minister to lead the country until the end of the snap elections scheduled for 20 September.

=== September ===
- September 20 – Legislative elections take place and Syriza led by Alexis Tsipras takes the most votes.
- September 21 – Alexis Tsipras is sworn in as Prime Minister of Greece for second time.
- September 23 – The Second Cabinet of Alexis Tsipras is sworn in (re-formation of the coalition of Syriza and ANEL).

=== November ===
- November 17 – The 6.5 M_{w} Lefkada earthquake shook the area with a maximum Mercalli intensity of VII (Very strong), killing two and injuring four.
