= 2019 in Greece =

- Decades: 1990s; 2000s; 2010s; 2020s
- See also: Other events of 2019; List of years in Greece

Events in the year 2019 in Greece.

== Incumbents ==
Photo	Post	Name
	President of the Hellenic Republic	Prokopis Pavlopoulos
	Prime Minister of Greece	Alexis Tsipras (until 8 July 2019)
	Prime Minister of Greece	Kyriakos Mitsotakis (starting 8 July 2019)
	Speaker of the Hellenic Parliament	Nikos Voutsis (until 18 July 2019)
	Speaker of the Hellenic Parliament	Konstantinos Tasoulas (starting July 18, 2019)
	Adjutant to the President of the Hellenic Republic	Navy Commander Nikolaos Patsakis

== Events ==
- 13 January - Greece Defence Minister Panos Kammenos and his Independent Greeks party quit Greece's ruling coalition on Sunday, over a deal struck on the Macedonia naming dispute. Potentially leaving the governing coalition without a workable majority in parliament.
- 25 January - Greek Parliament ratifies the Prespa Agreement, officially naming FYROM as “North Macedonia” by a narrow vote of 153 in the 300-seat House, despite strong public opposition.
- 26–27 May - European Parliament elections are held in Greece alongside the first round of local and regional elections; New Democracy win with 33.12% of the vote, defeating the ruling Syriza party.
- 19 July - A magnitude 5.3 earthquake strikes near Athens at 2:13 p.m., causing power outages, injuries, and communication problems.
- 11 December - Greek Parliament passes a constitutional amendment granting Greeks living abroad the right to vote in national elections, with 288 MPs in favor.

== Deaths ==
- Thanos Mikroutsikos, composer and former Minister of Culture of Greece (b. 1947)

== See also ==
- 2019 European Parliament election
