= 1987 in Greece =

- Decades: 1960s; 1970s; 1980s; 1990s; 2000s
- See also: Other events of 1987; List of years in Greece

Events in the year 1987 in Greece.

== Incumbents ==
- President – Christos Sartzetakis
- Prime Minister of Greece – Andreas Papandreou
