= 1989 in Greece =

- Decades: 1960s; 1970s; 1980s; 1990s; 2000s
- See also: Other events of 1989; List of years in Greece

Events in the year 1989 in Greece.

== Incumbents ==
- President – Christos Sartzetakis
- Prime Minister of Greece – Andreas Papandreou (until 2 July), Tzannis Tzannetakis (2 July – 12 October), Ioannis Grivas (12 October – 23 November), Xenophon Zolotas (starting 23)

== Births ==
- 12 January – Olga-Afroditi Pilaki, rhythmic gymnast
- 29 January – Maria Kakiou, rhythmic gymnast
- 24 June – Ilektra-Elli Efthymiou, rhythmic gymnast
