= 1985 in Greece =

- Decades: 1960s; 1970s; 1980s; 1990s; 2000s
- See also: Other events of 1985; List of years in Greece

Events in the year 1985 in Greece.

== Incumbents ==
Photo	Post	Name
	President of the Hellenic Republic	Konstantinos Karamanlis (until 10 March)
	President of the Hellenic Republic	Christos Sartzetakis (30 March)
	Prime Minister of Greece	Andreas Papandreou
	Speaker of the Hellenic Parliament and acting President of the Hellenic Republic (10 March - 29 March)	Ioannis Alevras
	Adjutant of the Hellenic Air Force	Spilios Spiliotopoulos (until 1985)

== Events ==
- March 10 - Karamanlis resigns from the Presidency after the surprising political gamble of Andreas Papandreou for not supporting Karamanlis for a second term, leading to a constitutional crisis.
- June 14 – TWA Flight 847 was hijacked by two Hezbollah terrorists after departing from Ellinikon International Airport in Athens. The Boeing 727-200 was carrying 145 passengers and crew to Rome, Italy.
- November 17 - Assassination of Michalis Kaltezas during annual November 17 Polytechnic demonstrations.
- November 23 - EgyptAir Flight 648 was hijacked by the Palestinian terrorist organization Abu Nidal from Ellinikon International Airport in Athens. The subsequent raid on the aircraft by Egyptian troops killed 56 of the 86 passengers, two of the three hijackers, and two of the six crew, making the hijacking of Flight 648 one of the deadliest such incidents in history.

== Births ==
- 31 January – Kalomira, Greek-American singer, in West Hempstead, New York, United States
- 18 March – Charikleia Pantazi, rhythmic gymnast
