= Storm Ballos =

October 2021 European windstorm in Europe

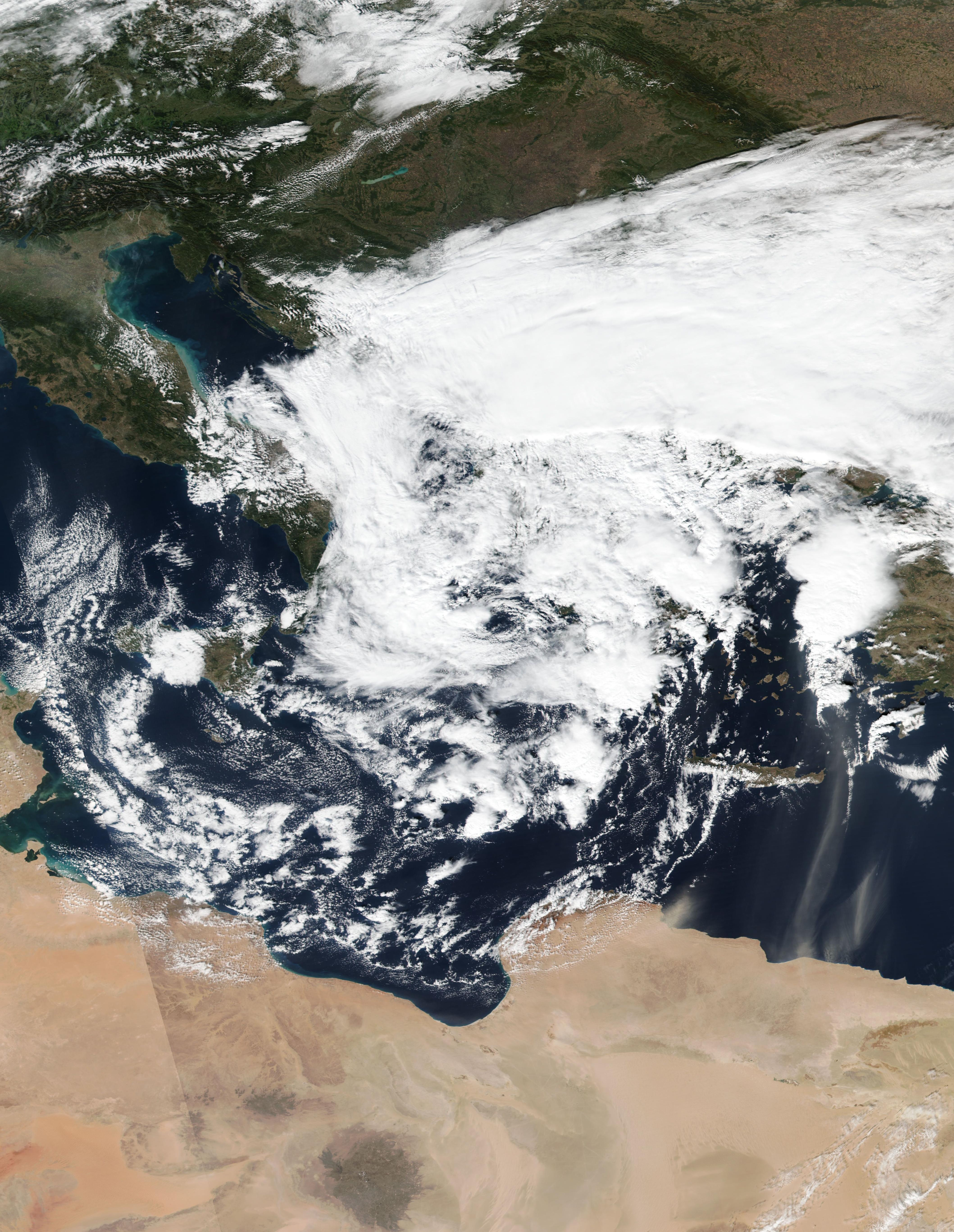
- Storm Ballos over Greece on 15 October

Meteorological history
- Formed: 13 October 2021
- Dissipated: 16 October 2021

Extratropical cyclone
- Lowest pressure: 1,005 mb (1,005 hPa)
- Maximum rainfall: >460 mm (18 in) in Ithaca
- Maximum snowfall or ice accretion: 15 cm (5.9 in)

Overall effects
- Casualties: 2
- Damage: A balcony collapsed in the Athens suburb of Halandri.
- Areas affected: France (Corsica), Italy, Greece, Slovenia, Croatia, Bosnia and Herzegovina, Serbia, Montenegro, North Macedonia, Albania
- Part of the 2021–22 European windstorm season

Storm Ballos was a notable extratropical cyclone that caused devastating floods across Greece during mid-October 2021. The second storm to be officially named in conjunction with the naming list of the former, Israel and Cyprus, Ballos formed on 13 October over the Mediterranean Sea from the combination of a frontal system and a circulation which first developed, two days earlier. It then moved over Greece, before proceeding into the Aegean Sea, where it slowly weakened and dissipated by 16 October. However, despite the HNMC naming the system, the Free University of Berlin (FUB) didn’t assign any name on it along with its weather maps.

Overall, Ballos caused heavy destruction in Greece, not a week after Storm Athina struck the country. Heavy rainfall caused many disruptions in transportation, along with the storm-spawned flash floods. Over 1,000 calls for help were received by Fire Brigade authorities and traffic bans were implemented to regulate traffic. Ithaca was impacted by 460 millimetres (18 inches) of rainfall, the highest in association with the system. Two more areas received rainfall higher than 260 millimetres (10 inches). In addition, Ballos also brought the first snow to the country, with Western Macedonia, with 15 centimetres (5.9 inches) falling there. Two deaths were reported in the country, all due to them being swept away by strong currents of floods.

== Meteorological history ==
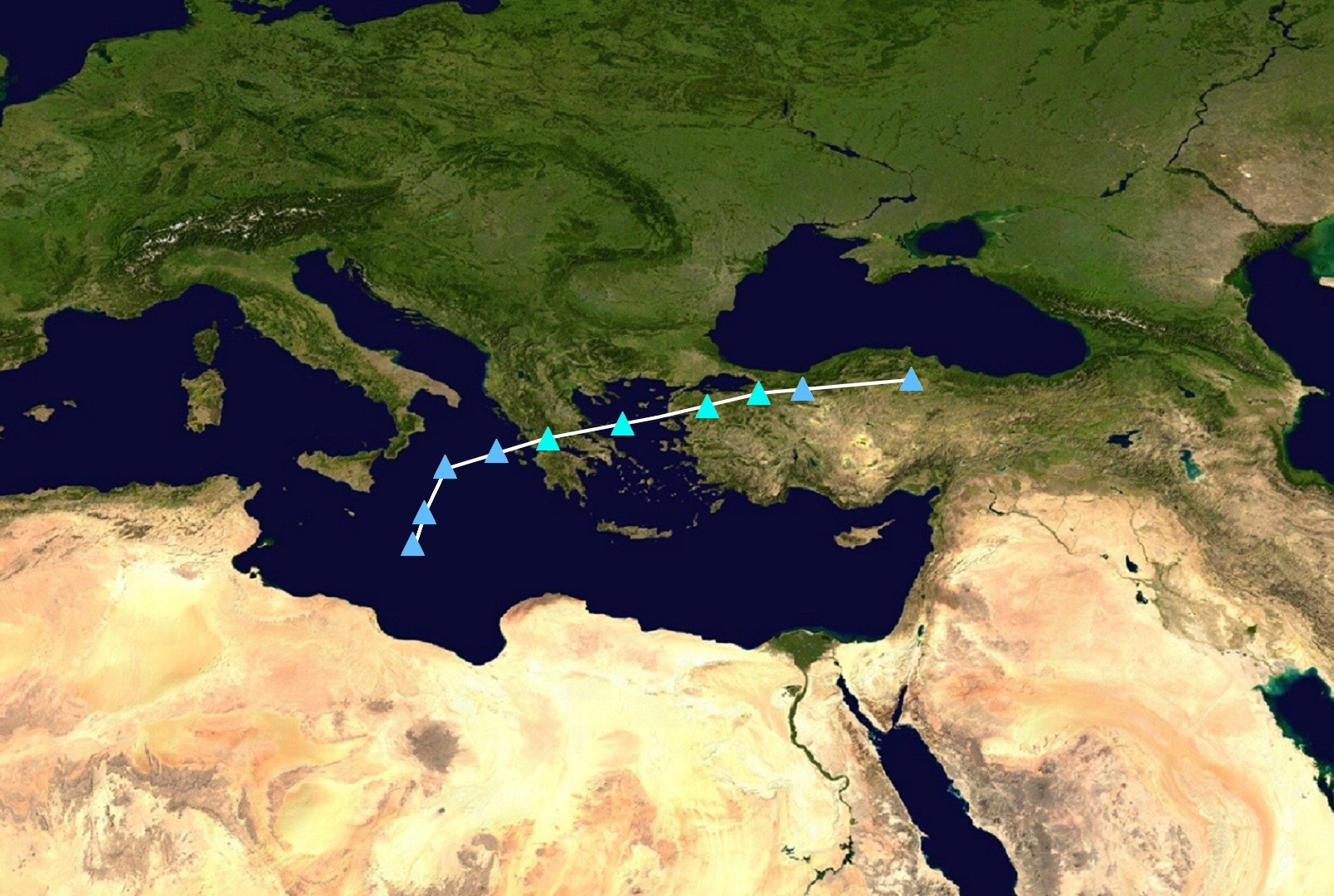
Map plotting the storm's track and intensity, according to the Saffir–Simpson scale Map key Saffir–Simpson scale Tropical depression (≤38 mph, ≤62 km/h) Tropical storm (39–73 mph, 63–118 km/h) Category 1 (74–95 mph, 119–153 km/h) Category 2 (96–110 mph, 154–177 km/h) Category 3 (111–129 mph, 178–208 km/h) Category 4 (130–156 mph, 209–251 km/h) Category 5 (≥157 mph, ≥252 km/h) Unknown Storm type Tropical cyclone Subtropical cyclone Extratropical cyclone, remnant low, tropical disturbance, or monsoon depression

Ballos originated from a circulation which developed on 11 October over Corsica. On the next day, an extratropical cyclone formed in the Black Sea, with a barometric pressure of 1,005 mbar (1,005 hPa). At that day, the circulation over the aforementioned island entered the Tyrrhenian Sea near southern Italy, in which it attained a pressure of 1,010 mbar (1,010 hPa). The storm over the Black Sea eventually moved northwards by 13 October, with the strengthening circulation over Italy merging over the system’s front. At the same day, the Hellenic National Meteorological Service named the strengthening storm “Ballos”, the second from the agency’s collaborated naming lists. It further coalesced into a single system near Greece on 14 October, with the storm connected to a strong high pressure area, in which the Free University of Berlin (FUB) named “Oldenburgia” before it moved northeastwards across the country on the next day and emerging into the Aegean Sea. It then continued its northeastward movement before dissipating on weather maps by 16 October.

== Impacts ==
According to the National Observatory of Athens (Εθνικού Αστεροσκοπείου Αθηνών [sic]), torrential rains with strong gusts, snow, and even hailstorms were anticipated for the bulk of Greece starting on October 13, as the Hellenic National Meteorological Service named the system Ballos. The country's Ministry of Climate Crisis and Civil Protection convened a conference to examine the storm, as well as issuing warnings to its citizens about Ballos. The Greek Armed Forces were also placed on alert in case additional assistance was required during Ballos. Cephalonia (also known as Kefalonia) halted lessons from preschool through high school on October 14 due to the storm. Classes were also canceled in Moschato, Nea Filadelfia, Attiki, and Archances on that day. More municipalities outside of Attica, including Nea Chalkidona, Moschato-Tavros, Heraklion, Elefsina, and Nafplio, as well as Argos-Mycenae, followed suit later that day. According to further reports, all classes in all districts of Attica were also halted as a precaution. Residents of Attica were also given phone alerts about the storm's potential effects.

On the 14th of October, rain began to fall over the country, causing significant traffic bottlenecks in Attica, particularly in Athens. Following that, one of the traffic-affected zones was restored. Flooding was to blame, according to the local newspaper Kathimerini. Meanwhile, the country's Fire Brigade Department received numerous calls for flood, water pumping, and tree removal assistance in some Athens suburbs and municipalities, the first of which was caused by the similar effect Storm Athina had on the country during the first week of October. Some kids at a primary school in Nea Filadelfeia were forced to cross an improvised bridge out of their rooms due to the school being severely flooded, while a Greek Parliament building was also damaged. Due to rapid flash floods, a route was also impassable to automobiles, and tram services were also disrupted. Many people were also stranded in their cars as a result of the floodwaters, but they were all successfully rescued by fire department personnel. Numerous landslides on Crete Island also damaged and/or destroyed public roadways. Due to the swath of Ballos' repercussions, Corfu Island was also classified in a "state of emergency." There were 69 persons who needed to be rescued.

Residents in Arkalochori, who had previously been hit by an earthquake, were flooded by Ballos' rains, which soaked everything from their tents to their food supplies. Two deaths were reported throughout the country as a result of the storm: one in Pikermi, where a person was swept away by a strong torrent of floods while crossing a bridge, and another in Tsakaioi, Karystos, where a senior citizen met the same fate; at this time, into a river. On 24 October in the evening, the Ionian Islands had received over 490 calls for assistance, with a total of 1,164 for the entire country. A traffic ban was requested for Kifissos and Attica due to the effects of Ballos, which was later accepted. The Fire Brigade leadership chose Corfu and Ithaca as the areas most impacted by the storm the next day, 15 October, and they worked nonstop to react to the calls in these areas. In Thessaloniki, a sinkhole swallowed a bus carrying 15 passengers, while another was nearly buried by floodwaters; neither incident resulted in any deaths or injuries. Over 30 tons of rain were also reported in the Kifissos basin, which a Natural Disaster Management official blamed on Greece's climate change. Furthermore, Ithaca receives the most rainfall from Ballos, with 460 millimetres (18 in), followed by Mount Athos with 297 millimetres (11.7 in) and Etoloakarnania with 262 millimetres (10.3 in). This is almost equivalent to Athens' monthly rainfall, but significantly less than the 700 millimetres (28 in) of rain recorded in Zagora and Pelion during Storm Athina. Along with the rain, the storm brought the season's first snowfall to Western Macedonia, with 15 centimetres (5.9 in) falling in the region.

== See also ==
- 2021-22 European windstorm season
- Storm Athina
