= 1971 in Greece =

- Decades: 1950s; 1960s; 1970s; 1980s; 1990s
- See also: Other events of 1971; List of years in Greece

The following lists events that happened during 1971 in Greece.

== Incumbents ==
- Monarch: Constantine II
- Regent: Georgios Zoitakis
- Prime Minister: Georgios Papadopoulos

== Births ==
- 13 December – Sakis Arnaoutoglou, politician

== Events ==
=== December ===
- December 15 – The 1971 Intercontinental Cup took place in Greece.

=== Date unknown ===
- Greece resumed diplomatic relations with Albania.
