= 1979 in Greece =

- Decades: 1950s; 1960s; 1970s; 1980s; 1990s
- See also: Other events of 1979; List of years in Greece

Events in the year 1979 in Greece.

== Incumbents ==
- President – Konstantinos Tsatsos
- Prime Minister – Konstantinos Karamanlis

== Births ==
- 20 April – Maria Pangalou, rhythmic gymnast
- 9 September – Vasileios Tsolakidis, artistic gymnast
