= 1982 in Greece =

- Decades: 1960s; 1970s; 1980s; 1990s; 2000s
- See also: Other events of 1982; List of years in Greece

Events in the year 1982 in Greece.

== Incumbents ==
- President – Konstantinos Karamanlis
- Prime Minister of Greece – Andreas Papandreou

== Births ==
- 27 January – Eva Asderaki, tennis umpire
