= 1970 in Greece =

- Decades: 1950s; 1960s; 1970s; 1980s; 1990s
- See also: Other events of 1970; List of years in Greece

The following lists events that happened during 1970 in Greece.

== Incumbents ==
- Monarch: Constantine II
- Regent: Georgios Zoitakis
- Prime Minister: Georgios Papadopoulos

== Deaths ==
- 15 February – Dimitrios Loundras, gymnast (born 1885)
