= 1986 in Greece =

- Decades: 1960s; 1970s; 1980s; 1990s; 2000s
- See also: Other events of 1986; List of years in Greece

Events in the year 1986 in Greece.

== Incumbents ==
- President – Christos Sartzetakis
- Prime Minister of Greece – Andreas Papandreou

== Events ==
- 13 September – The 6.0 M_{w} Kalamata earthquake shook the area with a maximum Mercalli intensity of X (Extreme). The shock left 20 dead and caused $5 million in damage.

== Births ==
- 3 June – Alexandros Karageorgiou, archer
- 9 November – Eleni Andriola, rhythmic gymnast
- 26 December – Marina Satti, singer
