= 1943 in Greece =

- Decades: 1920s; 1930s; 1940s; 1950s; 1960s
- See also: Other events of 1943; List of years in Greece

This is a list of events that happened in 1943 in Greece.

== Incumbents ==
- Monarch: George II
- Prime Minister: Emmanouil Tsouderos

== Events ==
- 16–17 February – Domenikon massacre by the Italian Army.
- 7 April – Konstantinos Logothetopoulos is dismissed as collaborationist Prime Minister and is succeeded by Ioannis Rallis.
- 14 May – The forces of EAM-ELAS attack the EKKA's 5/42 Regiment.
- 23 June – The forces of EAM-ELAS attack the EKKA's 5/42 Regiment and forcibly dissolve it.
- 5 July – The main Greek resistance groups conclude the National Bands Agreement.
- 12 August – Massacre of Kommeno by the German Army.
- 8 September – The Italian garrison on Kastellorizo surrenders to the Allies.
- 8 September – Jürgen Stroop becomes the country's HSSPF.
- 9–11 September – The Germans under Ulrich Kleemann seize Rhodes from the Italians.
- 14–16 September – Viannos massacres by the German Army.
- 15–24 September – Massacre of the Acqui Division on the island of Cephalonia by the German Army.
- 19–29 September – The Paramythia executions by the German Army and local Albanian collaborators.
- 3–4 October – Battle of Kos: the Germans capture the island of Kos against British and Italian resistance.
- 9 November – Walter Schimana becomes the country's HSSPF.
- 12–16 November – Battle of Leros: the Germans capture the island of Leros against British and Italian resistance.
- 13 December 1943 – Massacre of Kalavryta by the German Army.
- 14 December – 300 Allied bomber raid Athens.
- 15 December – Allied bombers raid Piraeus harbor and Greek airfields.
- 18 December – Drakeia massacre by the SS.

== Births ==
- 28 May – Elena Souliotis, operatic soprano (d. 2004)
- 17 November – Olga Damani, actress
