= 2013 in Greece =

- Decades: 1990s; 2000s; 2010s; 2020s
- See also: Other events of 2013; List of years in Greece

== Incumbents ==
Photo	Post	Name
	President of the Hellenic Republic	Karolos Papoulias
	Prime Minister of Greece	Antonis Samaras
	Speaker of the Hellenic Parliament	Vangelis Meimarakis

== See also ==
- 2013 in the European Union
- 2013 in Europe
