= 1981 in Greece =

- Decades: 1960s; 1970s; 1980s; 1990s; 2000s
- See also: Other events of 1981; List of years in Greece

Events in the year 1981 in Greece.

== Incumbents ==
- President – Konstantinos Karamanlis
- Prime Minister of Greece – Georgios Rallis (until 21 October), Andreas Papandreou (starting 21 October)

== Events ==
- 1 January – Greece joins European Communities.
- 24 February – The 6.7 M_{s} Gulf of Corinth earthquake shook the area with a maximum Mercalli intensity of VIII (Severe), killing 22, injuring 400, and causing $812 million in damage.

== Births ==
- 8 January – Ioannis Kokkodis, swimmer
- 23 March – Aikaterini Mamouti, artistic gymnast
