= 1983 in Greece =

- Decades: 1960s; 1970s; 1980s; 1990s; 2000s
- See also: Other events of 1983; List of years in Greece

Events in the year 1983 in Greece.

== Incumbents ==
Photo	Post	Name
	President of the Hellenic Republic	Konstantinos Karamanlis
	Prime Minister of Greece	Andreas Papandreou
	Speaker of the Hellenic Parliament	Ioannis Alevras

== Births ==
- 11 March – Eirini Aindili, rhythmic gymnast
- 27 September – Evangelia Christodoulou, rhythmic gymnast
- 8 October – Anna Pollatou, rhythmic gymnast (died 2014)
