= 1988 in Greece =

- Decades: 1960s; 1970s; 1980s; 1990s; 2000s
- See also: Other events of 1988; List of years in Greece

Events in the year 1988 in Greece.

== Incumbents ==
- President – Christos Sartzetakis
- Prime Minister of Greece – Andreas Papandreou

== Births ==
- 4 March – Sophia Ralli, skier
- 27 June – Stefani Bismpikou, artistic gymnast
- 14 September – Theodora Pallidou, rhythmic gymnast
- 30 December – Maria Apostolidi, artistic gymnast

== Deaths ==
- 17 March – Nikolas Asimos, composer and singer (born 1949)
- unknown date – Angelos Lembesi, Olympic skier (born 1917)
