= 1978 in Greece =

- Decades: 1950s; 1960s; 1970s; 1980s; 1990s
- See also: Other events of 1978; List of years in Greece

The following lists events that happened during 1978 in Greece.

== Incumbents ==
- President – Konstantinos Tsatsos
- Prime Minister – Konstantinos Karamanlis

== Events ==
- 20 June – The 6.2 M_{w} Thessaloniki earthquake affected Central Macedonia with a maximum Mercalli intensity of VIII (Severe), causing 45–50 deaths and 100–220 injuries.
- 9 August – Olympic Airways Flight 411

== Births ==
- 25 June – Virginia Karentzou, artistic gymnast
