= 1977 in Greece =

- Decades: 1950s; 1960s; 1970s; 1980s; 1990s
- See also: Other events of 1977; List of years in Greece

The following lists events that happened during 1977 in Greece.

== Incumbents ==
- President – Konstantinos Tsatsos
- Prime Minister – Konstantinos Karamanlis

== Events ==
- November – 1977 Greek legislative election
- Jewish Museum of Greece established

== Births ==
- 27 March – Ioannis Melissanidis, artistic gymnast
- 31 March – Maria Sansaridou, rhythmic gymnast
- 26 December – Sofia Bekatorou, sailor

== Deaths ==
- 16 September - Maria Callas, soprano (born 1923 in the United States)
