= Konstantina Margariti =

Greek gymnast (born 1980)

Personal information
- Nationality: Greek
- Born: 27 November 1980 (age 44); Athens, Greece

Sport
- Sport: Gymnastics

Konstantina Margariti (born 27 November 1980) is a Greek gymnast. She competed at the 1996 Summer Olympics.
