= Angela Kokkola =

Greek politician

Angela Kokkola (Greek: Αγγέλα Κοκκόλα, 13 July 1932 – 16 December 2017) was a Greek politician of the Panhellenic Socialist Movement (PASOK).

Born in Larissa, Kokkola was the daughter of a Greek Army General. She worked for the United Nations, for the International Social Service, and for the Greek Parliament.

In 1964 she became personal secretary to future Prime Minister Andreas Papandreou, and during Papandreou's first eight years as Prime Minister (1981 to 1989) she was named Director of the Prime Minister's Office. In 1993 Papandreou again became Prime Minister, but Kokkola did not return to her previous role. Instead, she was elected a Member of the European Parliament (MEP), serving from 1994 to 1999.
