= Eleftherios Veryvakis =

Greek politician (1935–2012)

- Born: 21 January 1935; Chania, Greece
- Died: 6 August 2012 (aged 77); Rethymno, Greece

Eleftherios Veryvakis (Greek: Ελευθέριος Βερυβάκης) (21 January 1935 – 6 August 2012) was a Greek politician and ex-member of the Greek Parliament for the Panhellenic Socialist Movement (PASOK).

In June 1967, during the military junta he was arrested and tortured for three months.

He was member of PASOK since its establishment in 1974 and he was elected to the Greek parliament for the first time in 1977. He got reelected in all elections till 2000. In 2003 he replaced Evangelos Giannopoulos after the latter's death.

He died on 6 August 2012.
