= 1995 Greek presidential election =

- 24 February, 2 and 8 March 1995
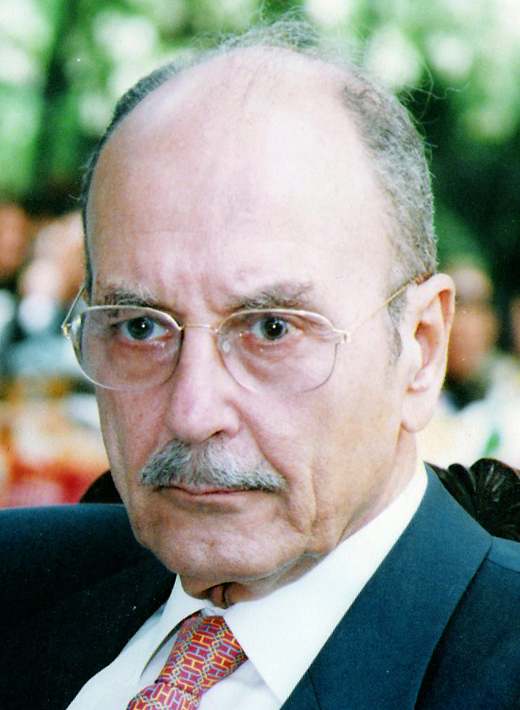

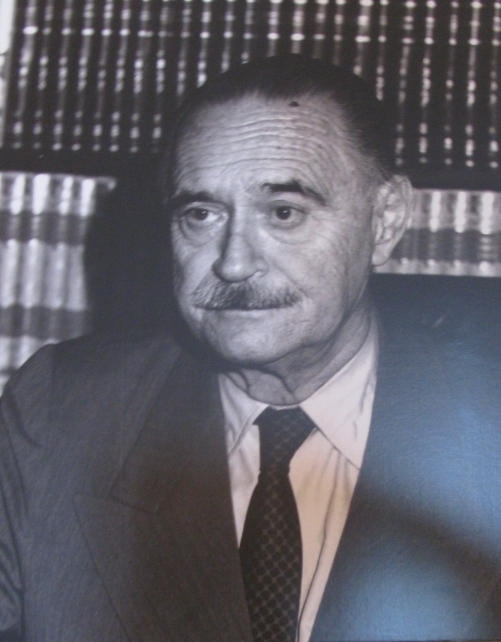
Nominee	Konstantinos Stephanopoulos	Athanasios Tsaldaris
Party	Independent	New Democracy
Alliance	PASOK, POLAN
Electoral vote	181	109
President before election
Konstantinos Karamanlis
New Democracy
President after election
Konstantinos Stephanopoulos
Independent

An indirect election for the position of President of the Hellenic Republic was held by the Hellenic Parliament in 1995.

In the parliament resulting from the 1993 elections, PASOK held the majority with 170 seats, followed by New Democracy with 111 seats and the Political Spring party (founded by breakaway ND politician Antonis Samaras) held 10 seats.

Conservative politician Konstantinos Stephanopoulos was proposed by Political Spring as successor of Konstantinos Karamanlis, who was finishing his second (non-consecutive) term, and was also supported by the ruling PASOK. New Democracy proposed veteran politician Athanasios Tsaldaris as its candidate. Three ballots were required for the election, which all had almost the same result: 181 votes for Stephanopoulos (the MPs of PASOK and Political Spring) and 109 (108 in the second ballot) for Tsaldaris (all but one of ND's MPs). The Communist Party of Greece and one ND MP voted "present".

Stephanopoulos would go on to be re-elected in 2000 as a joint candidate of ND and PASOK, the first time in the history of the Third Hellenic Republic that the ruling party and the main opposition party both supported the same candidate, as well as the first time that an incumbent President was re-elected.
