= Murder of Eleni Topaloudi =

2018 murder in Rhodes, Greece

Eleni Topaloudi
- Ελένη Τοπαλούδη
- Born: January 15, 1997; Serres, Greece
- Died: November 28, 2018 (aged 21); Rhodes, Greece
- Cause of death: Drowning
- Resting place: Didymoteicho, Greece
- Occupation: Student

Eleni Topaloudi (January 15, 1997 – November 28, 2018) was a Greek university student who was gang-raped and murdered by two male assailants on the island of Rhodes, Greece. At the time of her death, she was a fourth-year student at the Department of Mediterranean Studies of the Aegean University. She hailed from the town of Didymoteicho.

After a months-long trial, the two murderers, Manolis Koukouras and Aleksandër Luca, were each sentenced to life imprisonment for the murder plus 15 years imprisonment for the gang-rape without any downward departure.

== Timeline ==
Eleni's lifeless body was discovered floating on the water off "Fokia" beach near Pefki, Rhodes on November 28, 2018, and was retrieved by the Hellenic Coast Guard. She followed the two men in the residence of one of the two but, once there, the two perpetrators, Manolis Koukouras and Aleksandër Luca asked Eleni to have sexual intercourse with them. She refused any sexual advances, which prompted the men's violent response.

According to the forensic report, Eleni Topaloudi was subjected to a gang-rape. The two men then attacked her with a metal object causing her to lose her consciousness. She had received heavy blunt trauma to her head which caused the fracture of her skull and brain hemorrhage. Then, the two men moved her unconscious body to a nearby beach and threw her into the sea. According to the coroner, Eleni was still alive at this point. After the two men tossed her body onto the rocks, she lost her senses completely due to trauma and drowned. The car belonging to one of the perpetrators was found to contain DNA material belonging to the victim.

The two perpetrators were apprehended on December 5, 2018, by the authorities following an investigation of the available audiovisual material and DNA samples. Initially, both men confessed their actions. According to a statement made by the authorities the same month, Manolis Koukouras had a violent past, including multiple reports having been filled against him. Aleksandër Luca, during his initial testimony on December 5, said that Eleni was tortured inside the apartment and begged for the two assailants to transfer her to a hospital.

== Interrogations ==
The interrogations lasted in total 10 months, while the trial of the two men officially started on January 13, 2020. In their testimonies, the two assailants provided conflicting evidence, and both attempted to pin the blame onto the other. Due to the severity of the crime, the two perpetrators remained in custody up until the start of the trial, under court orders. On June 15, 2019, the case file was closed and evidence collection was halted, as the investigators had collected the necessary material evidence for the coming trial.

== Trial ==
The trial took place in the Mixed Jury Court of Athens and lasted almost 5 months. The case was concluded on May 15, 2020. The two men were found guilty of gang-rape and first-degree murder after a unanimous decision from the jury. Both perpetrators were sentenced to life imprisonment plus 15 years. During her oration, the prosecutor said the following: "I said to the father of Eleni Topaloudi not to worry. I'm living together with this girl. I don't have children of my own. I do, however, have cases involving children. I, too, want the truth to prevail. The fact that best speaks the truth that you want to hear is that your child was led like a sheep to its slaughter, like an unblemished lamb. Let Justice prevail and may the whole world perish. That is the position of the district attorney."

A new, second trial of Aleksandër Luca took place in June 2020, during which he was accused of raping a 19-year-old girl with disability, the rape of which occurred just 4 days after the murder of Eleni Topaloudi. The trial concluded on June 12, when the court declared Aleksandër guilty and sentenced him to a 15-year prison sentence.

An Appellate court in May 2022 handed down sentences by imposing the same sentence as that imposed by a lower court.

== Public response ==
The brutality of the rape and the following murder of Eleni Topaloudi provoked powerful reactions from multiple feminist movements and human right organizations, both within and beyond the Greek borders. The Eleni case was the starting point for a series of discussions about the true scale of sexism in Greece.

The prosecutor's speech on May 13 was, according to several journalists, a significant milestone in the feminist struggle against women-specific violence.

Additionally, this was the first time in Greek history where the term femicide was used by the Greek media to describe gendered violence against women. Since then, this term has been widely used to describe all murders against women by men, especially when there are underlying sexist and misogynistic motives.

Rouvikonas, a Greek anarchist collective, broke into the office of the defense attorney of Manolis Koukouras, accusing him of protecting the murderers of Eleni and attempting to distort the truth. Previously, the attorney had received widespread criticism from the media due to his position in the trial.

Popular song Writer Fivos Delivorias honored Eleni by writing a song dedicated to her.

=== Family response ===
On their first interview after the trial, the family of the victim made calls to raise awareness within Greece and they made a plea to justice so that similar cases may get a similar treatment. Additionally, they spoke of the importance of the sentencing in their daughter's trial and expressed the necessity of reporting crimes against women.
