= 1973 in Greece =

- Decades: 1950s; 1960s; 1970s; 1980s; 1990s
- See also: Other events of 1973; List of years in Greece

The following lists events that happened during 1973 in Greece.

== Incumbents ==
- Monarch: Constantine II (until 1 June)
- President: Georgios Papadopoulos (1 June to 25 November), Phaedon Gizikis (starting 25 November)
- Regent: Georgios Papadopoulos (until 1 June)
- Prime Minister: Georgios Papadopoulos (until 8 October), Spyros Markezinis (8 October to 25 November), Adamantios Androutsopoulos (starting 25 November)

== Events ==
- June 1: Military government abolishes the monarchy.
- July 29: Republic referendum held. Abolition of monarchy confirmed.
- November 14–17: Athens Polytechnic uprising against the military junta governing the country. The uprising ended in a bloodshed after the intervention of the military.
