= Theodoros Mitras =

Member of the Greek Parliament (1948–2021)

Theodoros Mitras (1948 – 12 January 2021) was a Greek politician who served as a Member of Parliament. Born in Katerini, Greece, he was a member of the New Democracy Party and a member of the Hellenic Parliament from 1993 to 1996.
