= Lila Christoforidou =

Greek politician (1939–2024)

Lila Chistoforidou
- Λίλα Χριστοφορίδου

Member of the Hellenic Parliament
- In office 18 October 1981 – 7 May 1985

Personal details
- Born: Pavlou Kyriakoula Christoforidou; 1939 Piraeus, Greece
- Died: 9 September 2024 (aged 84–85) Athens, Greece
- Party: Pasok
- Education: Aristotle University of Thessaloniki
- Occupation: Lawyer

Pavlou Kyriakoula "Lila" Christoforidou (Greek: Παύλου Κυριακούλα "Λίλα" Χριστοφορίδου; 1939 – 9 September 2024) was a Greek lawyer and politician. A member of Pasok, she served in the Hellenic Parliament from 1981 to 1985.

Christoforidou died in Athens on 9 September 2024.
