= Greece and the European Union =

The institutional relationship between Greece and the European Union originates in the accession of Greece into the European Economic Community on January 1, 1981. Greece has been a key member state in the Union since, due to its geographical placement as an ocean border of the continent. The integration process created ongoing turbulence, often caused by both national and international economic, political and social instability. The main sectors which have shaped cooperation and policies include trade, agriculture, immigration and energy.

== Historical background on the relationship ==
On the 8th of June 1959, Greece officially sent a request to come into association with the European Economic Community in its free trade area alongside what was known as the Six – Belgium, France, West Germany, Italy, Luxembourg, and the Netherlands. At the time, Greece economically depended heavily on the six members, as it sourced over fifty percent of its imports and exports from them. Therefore, under Article 238 of the Treaty of Rome which opened the EEC for the possibility of expansion with third countries, Greece sought after national economic and trade gains whilst growing the Community beyond its core members.

Although Greece did not present itself as a strong financial beneficiary to the EEC, the Community ultimately acknowledged the strength that political affiliations will bring and therefore agreed to begin working towards cooperation under the terms of an 'association' rather than a full membership. These negotiations occurred both bilaterally and multilaterally through a Special Committee focusing primarily on the subjects of the amount of financial aid which will be allocated to Greece and the integration of Greek products, such as tobacco and agricultural produce, in the common market. This process was extensive and complex as there were many disagreements from the member states regarding the acceptance of the terms Greece was willing to offer. Ultimately, it was decided upon by the Community that a separate customs union will be introduced for trade of Greek goods, and that the European Bank will invest 125 million dollars to Greece over a five-year period.

On the 30th of March 1961 negotiations regarding the terms of the agreement were finalized and the Association Agreement was signed in Athens on the 9th of July of the same year. The Agreement included economic policy for Greece's assimilation into the Common Market, as it was the first third-party European country to financially integrate into the system. It also included guidelines for surrounding factors of this ecosystem, such as freedom of movement, tariffs, transport, and other essential services. Furthermore, the Agreement laid down a foundation for future acceptance of Greece as a full member of the Community. The Agreement was then passed to both the European Parliament and the parliaments of the member states for final authorization.

== Relations before accession ==
The Association Agreement and the declaration of potential future membership were based not only on economic obligations, but also on the presumption of ideological alignment. Therefore, the military authoritative regime led by Colonel Georgios Papadopoulos which took power in Greece in 1967 presented a troublesome blockade for the European Community to go forward with its partnership. The military junta based its rule on non-democratic actions such as the infringement of civil rights and the silencing of political opponents. This proposed a dilemma for the European Community, as these exertions overtly negated the core principles on which the Community was founded and aimed to collectively uphold. However, at the time, there was a concern of the creation of a 'third Europe' by countries which were ruled by right-wing authoritative regimes, such as Portugal and Spain. These were leaderships which excluded themselves from both the Soviet and the democratic based European blocks. Therefore, the Community feared that if it were to plainly reject Greece from its ongoing collaborative efforts, it would only strengthen the 'third Europe'.

Following this change of ideological governance, the European Parliament called on the Community to freeze the Association Agreement and its Joint Committee meetings until the government retracted its wrongdoings. Furthermore, the Parliament issued a statement on May 11, 1967, denouncing the junta's authoritative approach and calling for the reinstatement of democracy in Greece. Following this declaration, the European Commission took initiative in September 1967 to take part in the efforts to pressure the Greek leadership by maintaining the parts of the Association Agreement which included definitive trade and customs obligations but suspended temporarily any further negotiations and expansion of the arrangement until the Greece democracy was restored.

== Application for accession and negotiations ==
After seven years of internal turmoil, a transitional government was sworn into leadership on the 24th of July 1974, led by Prime Minister Konstantinos Karamanlis with the main goal or re-democratizing Greece's political system. Soon after in August the European Parliament president, Cornelis Berkhouwer, was invited by the new government to Greece to discuss a possible resolution for the halt in cooperations between Greece and the European Community. Following Berkhouwer's visit, the European Parliament acknowledged the developments and governmental efforts in Greece, and soon after negotiations regarding the reinstatement of the full Association Agreement were reignited during a Political Affairs Committee meeting on the 4th of September 1974. Ultimately conditions to be fulfilled by the Greek government were set by the Parliament which included holding free parliamentary elections and a full restoration of the rule of law and human rights.

On the 26th of September, another debate regarding the topic was held in the European Parliament, but of great significance due to the renewed ability of Greek citizens to be exposed to these negotiations through a free press. Peter Corterier, who was the Parliament's rapporteur on Greece, was able to communicate that these talks aim to signal to Greece the willingness of the European Community for it to join as a full member and assisting it to do so, but in order for them to be viable for full accession, complete democratization of its systems must first be restored. Although overall the European Parliament showed positive willingness for Greece's full accession into the Community, some members found the transitional government troublesome, as they suspected it did not fully encompass true democratic values. It was raised that those appointed into political positions were done so by members of the military junta themselves, therefore questioning the legitimacy of its democratic basis. However, it was then reported that the first free parliamentary elections were set to be held in November of the same year, and so it was decided that a delegation of the Political Affairs Committee was to be sent to Greece in order to further encourage the democratic developments and to advance the civil relations between the Greek public and the European Community.

Following the November elections, the Greek government officially applied for accession into the European Community on the 12th of June 1975 during an Association Council in Athens ahead of the reinstatement of the Association Agreement in July. The first Joint Parliamentary Committee meeting since the authoritative junta regime took place from June 25 to June 27, 1975, after years of being on hold, which was led by the head of the Greek Parliament delegation, Yiangos Pesmazoglou and the head of the European Parliament delegation, Paul De Clercq. Following the submission for accession, it was agreed that renewing political cooperations between Greece and the Community was essential in anchoring the refurbished democratic system, and that the acceptance of full membership will stabilize the continuous development of democracy for the future. After the sequence of progress in 1974, from the transitional government and parliamentary elections and the public vote for a republic instead of a monarchy, a resolution was adopted by the European Parliament on the 12th of November 1975, which positively acknowledged these actions taken by Greece in democratizing its political system.

Due to the quick nature of the productive developments in the Greek government, the Parliament seized the opportunity to put pressure on the European Council and the Commission in order to hasten the process of its accession to the Community. This was positively taken into consideration, and, with influential recommendation and guidance from the Parliament, official negotiations for accession began in July 1976. Greece aimed primarily for rapid accession, notably due to the already existing Association Agreement, and that different sectors should be allocated a different transitional period as necessary. Furthermore, a significant request was made with regards to agriculture, which included aid in integrating into the Common Agricultural Policy and the introduction of products such as cotton, peaches and olive oil into the common market. Due to its weakened position both economically and in manufacturing, Greece sought after budgetary support and derogations in both industrial and trade sectors. Greece, once its membership was official, also expected to be a complete participant in the other European institutions such as the Council, the Parliament and the Commission.

On the 23rd of May 1979, the Commission published its statement regarding Greece's application and included its opinion that democratic values should be considered an unwavering standard for national accession to the Community as they viewed it as a foundation for European unification. And, although this was heavily debated amongst the Council, it ultimately disclosed that democracy will be part of the acquis communautaire standard for membership application.

Although the Greek government hoped that its accession to the Community would reap financial benefits due to increased tourism, fixed agricultural pricing and funding, the underdeveloped state of Greece's economy in comparison to that of the rest of the Community members proposed itself as another hurdle in the accession process. In addition to its gross domestic product being 50% below the average of the rest of the Community, Greece's economy was largely agriculture-based, taking up employment of more than 26% of its working population, in contrast to only 8% of the Community's working population. Furthermore, it was feared that the accession of Greek produce would cause a surplus of certain products in the Community market, such as olive oil and wine, due to an already existing overproduction from the Nine members, specifically Italy and France. And, in turn, there was the risk that the flood of the Community's strong industrial system would overtake small Greek businesses and therefore damage Greece's internal economy. In addition, with Greece's high unemployment rates, there was also the concern that the accession may lead to the Community being struck with a wave of cheap labor flooding in from Greece. Therefore, in its opinion statement in 1976, the Parliament warned that an immediate admittance of Greece will create economic instability, and that a transitional pre-accession period of up to eight years should be established in order for the integration to happen exponentially in a safer, more orderly and effective manner.

Another key reason for the EC's interest in the accession of Greece was due to circumstantial considerations of the Cold War, as it raised concerns over being a possible weakening point of the southern flank. Following its withdrawal from NATO, the Nine members of the Community acknowledged that Greece was a crucial asset to the Western block due to the fact that it was a front-line state. Understanding that they cannot provide a solution for Greece's conflicts in Cypriot, Turkish and Aegean fronts, the EEC understood that accession was the best approach to prevent Greece from pulling back and withdrawing from the Western fold. Therefore, the addition of Greece was seen as a way of promoting not only political and economic stability in the region, but also external security for the West. Furthermore, following the anti-American sentiments which became prominent in the Greek approach, the Community acted as a bridging figure between the two countries, which proved and cemented Europe as a relevant power in the Western front of the war. Therefore, Greece's accession, which opened for further expansion into southern Europe, presented itself as an opportunity for the Community to become a relevant international actor and to assist in the ultimate closure of the Cold War.

Ultimately negotiations were finalized in May 1979, with the Community recognizing that, with the condition that Greece adopts its acquis communautaire, the need to preserve democracy in the region in addition to the southern flank prevailed over its economic reservations. A five-year transitional period was put in place for most sectors and economic aid was granted to assist economic integration. Furthermore, Greek representation in the other European institutions was approved to commence following official accession.

== Accession ==
Following negotiations beginning in July 1976, Greece's application for accession to the Community was approved with the signing of the Accession Deed in May 1979 in the Zappeion Megaron in Athens. The official Accession Treaty then came into effect on the first of January in 1981 and was of great significance as the addition of Greece represented the beginning of the Community's Mediterranean enlargement. The permanent membership also gave hope of giving stability to Greece's recently renewed democratic infrastructure and weakened economy.

However, following the accession, both Greece and the EEC faced immediate political and economic challenges. Although the Community was optimistic about being of assistance in stabilizing Greece's democracy, these intentions were challenged by the new government which was voted-in following the accession. The Panhellenic Socialist Movement (also known as PASOK) led by Andreas Papandreou, were overtly against being a part of the Economic Community and went as far as to advocate for its withdrawal, which created turbulence in their political relationship. Papandreou claimed that the Community will only weaken Greece's economy due to inflation and harm those working in agriculture.

Within the first year of its accession, Greece faced only minor financial growth as a result of minimal financial profits due to the EEC's budget in addition to external trade deficits. This caused PASOK to seek after the implementation of several protocols such as import tariffs and subsidization of products which conflicted with the intended free trade market within the Community.

Greece's accession also caused issues within the other Community states. Its addition introduced cheap labor, which presented itself as an advantage to that of other members, whilst simultaneously not improving the overall EEC unemployment rates, which stood at approximately 8.3% at the time. Furthermore, as was initially of concern, the introduction of Greek agricultural produce, such as wine and fruits, inflated the common market and created strenuous competition for countries such as France and Italy. This issue presented itself as a concern for future plans of the Community's expansion, as it was suspected that the addition of other countries, such as Spain and Portugal, would only broaden the phenomenon.

== Current relations ==
=== Economic relations ===
One of the main issues which shapes the modern-day relationship and major policies between Greece and the European Union is the instability of its economy. Greece entered the Eurozone in 2001 impaired, with a budget deficit above 3% and a debt-to-GDP ratio of over 100%, which only worsened following its hosting of the 2004 Olympics (which caused the Commission to establish fiscal monitoring in 2005) and plummeted during the Great Recession. In 2010, alongside the International Monetary Fund, the EU loaned 110 billion euros in exchange for Prime Minister Georgios Papandreou's commitment to austerity efforts. On February 21, 2012, the EU and the IMF approved a bailout for Greece to which its Parliament attached new austerity measures in 2013, erupting protests from labor unions. Unable to meet its deadline in June 2015, another bailout for 2018 was approved in August. Despite economic reforms, by 2018 Greece accumulated debts of an estimated 290 billion euros to the EU and IMF. In order to relieve additional future financial debt, the government committed to adopting a new budget plan through 2060 alongside EU supervision and continuing to implement further austerity measures.

=== Migration ===
In 2015, Europe was met with an influx of immigration from the Middle East through Turkey, with Greece being the gateway country for an estimated one million refugees into the continent during a period of economic recession. Following an open-border policy, the government faced financial, political and social turbulence, but aligned the EU's efforts in enhancing border and migration control in addition to a proposed EU-Turkey deal to reduce the flow of refugees. Greece also supported the EU's policies on integration, immigration and asylum, in addition to the approach that the issue should be handled on the EU level, rather than nationally.

As of 2024, the Commission and its Task Force for Migration Management have put in place policies and mechanisms in order to assist Greece in the field of managing the phenomenon. The EU offers continuous support in border control and allocated one billion euros in the 2021–2027 Home Affairs Funds in addition to introducing an action plan to assist in voluntary relocation of immigrants to either their homeland or to different Schengen states. Furthermore, infrastructures such as Multi-Purpose Reception and Identification Centers, healthcare services and integration programs have been established aimed to ease the process of assimilation of migrants in Greece. However, Greece has received backlash from the ECtHR regarding its handling of the situation due to alleged numerous breaches of fundamental human rights which include the pushbacks of refugees on both land and ocean borders, the forced return of migrants to non-safe countries, and withholding of proper resources.

=== Energy ===
Greece, being at the heart of Europe, the Middle East, Africa and Asia, plays a key role in the EU's mission on reducing its dependence on Russian gas and transitioning to sources of clean, renewable and sustainable energy in addition to promoting energy security. This includes projects such as the Greece-Egypt Interconnector, the EuroAsia Interconnector and the Trans Adriatic Pipeline. In recent years Greece was able to reach significant achievements in the field, such as an above-average net emissions reduction from 2005 to 2023 of 48.5%, and an estimated 2/3 reduction of emissions from ETS sectors. Under REPowerEU, 38% of its 36.61-billion-euro funding to Greece is allocated towards climate objectives through investments in renewables and energy efficiency sectors including wind parks, the interconnection between the mainland and the Cyclades islands, and reforestation.

=== Euroscepticism ===
Euroscepticism is a prevalent phenomenon amongst the Greek public, with such sentiments increasing during periods of economic crises, such as the Great Recession, immigration influx, and nationalistic conflicts. Anti-EU rhetoric in Greece is often stemmed from political parties, such as the KKE and the Greek Solution. Although lower than in heightened times of crisis, the spring 2025 Eurobarometer surveyed that 59% of Greeks report a tendency of mistrust towards the European Union institution, and 33% that the EU conjures a negative image. The New Democracy, the current appointed political party, however, is overtly pro-European and promotes for a united Europe, as a continuation of Konstantinos Karamanlis's legacy, who founded the party and managed Greece's integration into the EEC.
