= Maria Kastrisianaki =

Greek broadcaster (1948–2021)

- Born: Μαρία Καστρισιανάκη; 30 June 1948; Thessaloniki
- Died: 11 January 2021 (aged 72); Horsham, U.K.
- Occupations: Journalist and broadcaster

Maria Kastrisianaki (Greek: Μαρία Καστρισιανάκη) (30 June 1948 – 11 January 2021) was a Greek journalist and broadcaster.

Upon completing a diploma in economics at City University, London, Kastrisianaki moved to Athens. There she wrote for various publications and started her work for the Greek state radio station ERT. Maria was commissioned to write and present three series: Flight of the Condor [Το πέταγμα του Κόνδορα], covering the culture, politics and history of Latin America, Southern Wind ["Νότιος άνεμος"], which focused on the developing world and the gulf between rich and poor, and finally Our Common Future [“Το κοινό μας μέλλον”] in which she explored sustainable development and environmental issues.

Maria married Briton Tony Guyton, then living in Athens, in 1988. Six years after their marriage, the family moved to Sussex and for the last 26 years of her life, she lived in Great Britain. In 1994, Kastrisianaki started working for the Greek Service of the BBC, as a radio producer until the closure of all BBC European departments in 2006. From 2009, she was the UK correspondent for the Greek Radio Service of Deutsche Welle. Later she contributed to reviews and articles to the Athens-based Books Journal.

Kastrisianaki died on 11 January 2021, aged 72, from breast cancer.
