= Giorgos Karaivaz =

Greek journalist (1968–2021)

- Γιώργος Καραϊβάζ
- Born: 27 November 1968; Kallifytos, Drama, Greece
- Died: 9 April 2021 (aged 52); Athens, Greece
- Occupation: Journalist
- Years active: 1989 - 2021
- Employer: Star Channel

Giorgos Karaivaz (Greek: Γιώργος Καραϊβάζ; 27 November 1968 – 9 April 2021) was a Greek investigative journalist who specialized in organized crime. He was assassinated on 9 April 2021.

== Biography ==
Born in Kallifytos, Drama, Greece, Karaivaz worked for the television channel Star Channel. He was also founder of the news website Bloko.

== Assassination ==
Karaivaz was shot and killed near his home in Athens suburb of Alimos on 9 April 2021. The first indications were that the assassination was carried out by those involved in organized crime. All Greek parties expressed their condolences, as well as the president of the European Commission Ursula von her Leyen, who declared that an assassination of a journalist in a European country is a "despicable, cowardly act", she then expressed her wish that the perpetrators would be found soon.

Karaivaz's computer, car and mobile phone were sent to the Directorate of Criminal Investigations. Given the fact that he was an active journalist, the police believed that it is possible that they would find evidence leading them to the murderers, as well as to the persons who ordered the assassination. According to their investigations, they concluded that there were two groups of conspirators. The first group was watching Karaivaz when he left the premises of the Star Channel TV station where he worked, who then informed the team of assassins about his movements.

The police investigators examined the phone calls of the two assassins along with their accomplices and three videos from security cameras at different points of the site of the assassination. The cameras showed that the assassins checked the area around the street of Themos Anninos before killing the journalist. The investigators have also focused on Karaivaz's contacts, as well as on the reports he published on his website bloko.gr, while hoping to find a clue as to the reasons behind the murder.

The European Federation of Journalists announced that they would send a mission to Greece, partially because of Karaivaz's murder, to assess the concern of media freedom and safety of local journalists.
