= 2014 in Greece =

- Decades: 1990s; 2000s; 2010s; 2020s
- See also: Other events of 2014; List of years in Greece

The following lists events that happened during 2014 in the Hellenic Republic.

== Incumbents ==
Photo	Post	Name
	President of the Hellenic Republic	Karolos Papoulias
	Prime Minister of Greece	Antonis Samaras
	Speaker of the Hellenic Parliament	Vangelis Meimarakis
	Adjutant of the Hellenic Army	Lazaros Rizopoulos (starting 2014)

== Events ==
=== May ===
- May 5 – At least two people are dead and 30 missing after two boats carrying illegal immigrants collide in the Aegean Sea off the coast of Greece.
- May 24 – The 6.4 M_{w} Aegean Sea earthquake shook the area with a maximum Mercalli intensity of VIII (Severe), causing 324 injuries and $450 million in damage.
- May 25 – Greece votes in European and second-round local elections.

=== November ===
- November 27 – Greek labor unions begin a general strike to protest ongoing government austerity measures shutting down public medical, educational, and transportational services.

=== December ===
- December 5 – The British Museum announces that it will loan one of the Elgin Marbles in its collection, originally taken from Greece, to the Hermitage Museum in Saint Petersburg. Greece's Prime Minister Antonis Samaras calls the move "a provocation to the Greek people."
- December 23 – The Greek parliament fails to elect a new president in the second round of voting.
- December 28 – The Italian-owned MS Norman Atlantic catches fire on a ferry run from Greece to Italy 44 nautical miles northwest of Corfu, with 222 vehicles, 411 passengers and 5 crew on board. Greek and Italian officials report at least one person is dead.
- December 29 – Snap elections are to be called after the Hellenic Parliament fails to elect a new Greek president.

== Deaths ==
17 May – Anna Pollatou, rhythmic gymnast (born 1983)

== See also ==
- Greek legislative election, January 2015
- Cabinet of Antonis Samaras
