= Ioannis Petridis =

Greek economist and politician (1931–2016)

Ioannis Petridis (Greek: Ιωάννης Πετρίδης; 18 August 1931 – 6 January 2016) was a Greek economist and politician. He was a member of the New Democracy party. He served as an MP for Pieria from 1985 to 1989. He was born in Katerini.

Petridis died on 6 January 2016 in Athens, aged 84.
