= My Excuse =

Greek alternative rock band

- Genres: Alternative rock, rock
- Years active: 2003–present
- Labels: Terret Entertainment, EMI Music
- Members: Steven
- Website: http://www.MyExcuseBand.com

My Excuse is an alternative modern rock band from Greece. They were formed by their American frontman Steven Triantafillis and in 2003 they released their first album with Universal Music. The band consists of Steven (vocals, guitars), Markus (guitars), Theo (bass), Baha (drums) and Tass (keys). Over the last years the band is holding a great number of live performances gaining popularity through their songs and their solid stage presence. The band's lead vocalist acknowledges Kings of Leon as a major influence on their sound and material.

== Biography ==
In 2010 they released the single "Is it Over Now", produced by Ron St Germain, which saw huge success in Greece and established them as one of the best English-speaking bands.

July 2012 and My Excuse have returned from their first U.S. tour. While in New York, they completed a series of live performances, studio sessions and a variety of activities that will further evolve their dynamic course and talent. They successfully performed in a number of historic venues, including the Stars & Stripes Festival in Lake Michigan.

On July 11, 2012 My Excuse released their first international single "Silent Revolution" by EMI Music in Greece and independently worldwide. The track is part of their new album, which has been recorded while on their U.S. tour and produced by Ron St Germain. The title of the song, "Silent Revolution", concerns society's apathy and how we get used to society's mechanisms that eventually transform us to non-reacting people. Although we don't like much of what is happening, most of us choose to observe silently.

Currently, My Excuse is in the US and has successfully completed their Kickstarter project funding while preparing for their Spring Tour in the US and Canada. A total 135 backers helped fund the tour, pledging a total $10,592. Most of the funds - about three-quarters of it - came from Greeks in the United States. The successful accomplishment of My Excuse funding project on Kickstarter led the organizational board to invite the band as speakers on a panel during the conference. On February 15 My Excuse spoke at MMC unveiling secrets of a successful Kickstarter project. During the second day of MMC the band performed at Gullifty's Underground in front of an enthusiastic audience and media reporters. After the group's show, audience members kept approaching the band, buying CDs, asking for autographs and raving about how their show was the best they had seen at Millennium. Several said they had not seen a band at Millennium do such a great performance since Halestorm - a band which had just won a Grammy Award. Playing in Harrisburg is an opportunity for My Excuse to leave barriers at home. In Greece, the group faces a musical and cultural barrier, rather than a language one.

This would be their second tour across the US, only this time they are going to visit some of the largest cities in North America such as New York City, Miami, Detroit, Chicago, South Dakota, Florida and play more than 30 live performances. Also, they will participate in the Canadian Music Week 2013 (also known as CMW), one of the largest festivals in Canada.

== Singles ==
- 2010: "Is it Over Now"
- 2012: "Silent Revolution" - Lyrics

== Albums ==
- 2013: All I've become

== Live TV performances ==
- 2012 MadWalk by MAD TV (Greece): "Is it Over Now / Hit Me / We found Love", feat Ilia Darlin.
