= Yannis Katsafados =

Greek lawyer (1935–2020)

Yannis Katsafados (Greek: Γιάννης Κατσαφάδος; 9 May 1935 – 2 March 2020) was a Greek lawyer and politician who served as both MP and MEP.
