= Nikos Psyroukis =

- Born: 1926; Ismailia, Egypt
- Died: 6 July 2003 (aged 76–77); Athens, Greece
- Occupations: writer, historian

Nikos Psyroukis (Greeκ:Νίκος Ψυρούκης; 1926 - 6 July 2003) was a Greek writer, journalist and one of the leading modern Greek Marxist historians.

He was born in Ismailia in Egypt and studied at Charles University, Czechoslovakia. In 1956 he defended his doctoral thesis on the "Asia Minor Disaster". He moved to Greece in 1961 where he worked for the newspaper "Naftergatiki-Naftemporiki" and the magazine "Istoriki Epitheorisi". In 1967, during the Greek military junta, he and his wife were exiled to Gioura island.

== Publications ==
He wrote twenty five books including "Istoria tis Syghronis Elladas, 1940-1974"; "Deyteros Pagkosmios Polemos"; "O Neoapoikismos"; "Oi Taxikoi Agones stin Epohi tou Kapitalismou"; "To Kypriako Drama"; "O Epikouros ki i Epohi mas"; "Istorikos Horos ki Ellada"; "Neoelliniki Eksoteriki Politiki"; "I Entaxi tis Elladas stin EOK"; "Istoria tis Apoikiokratias"; "O Fasismos ki h 4i Augoustou"; "To Neoelliniko Paroikiako Phainomeno"; "I Diamaxi sto Aigaio"; "To Kypriako Zitima"; and "I Mikrasiatiki Katastrophi, 1918-1923: I Engis Anatoli meta ton Prōto Pankosmio Polemo".
