= Maria Matsouka =

Greek politician

Maria Matsouka (born 8 January 1974 in Agrinio) is a Greek politician and Member of the European Parliament for the Panhellenic Socialist Movement; part of the Party of European Socialists.
