= 2000 Greek presidential election =

← 1995	8 February 2000	2005 →
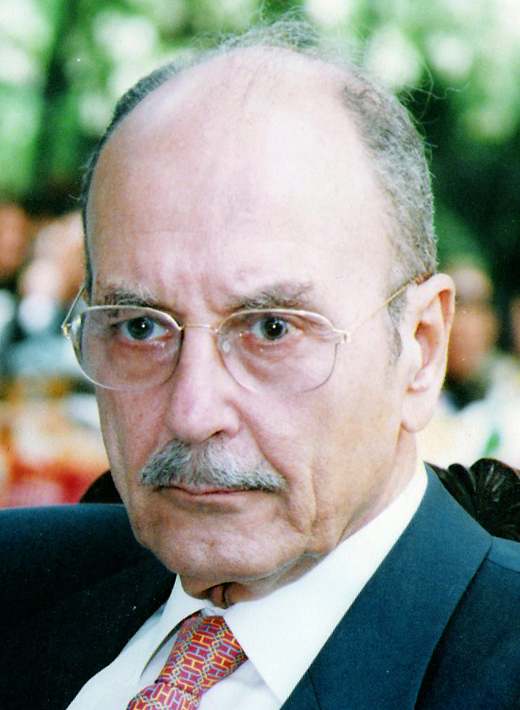

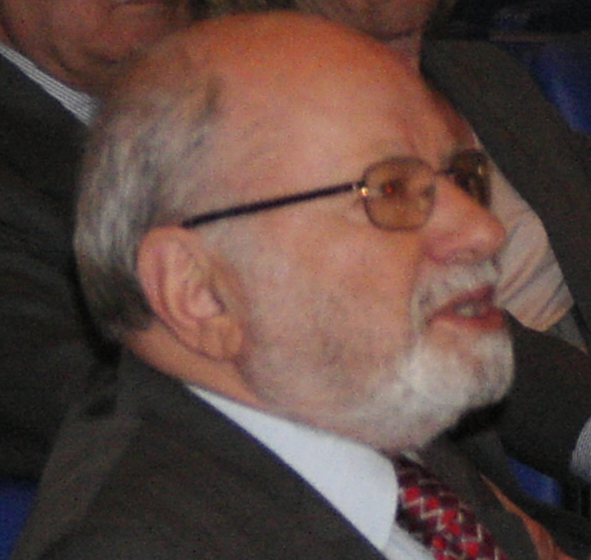
Nominee	Konstantinos Stephanopoulos	Leonidas Kyrkos
Party	Independent	Synaspismos
Alliance	PASOK, ND
Electoral vote	269	10
President before election
Konstantinos Stephanopoulos
Independent
President after election
Konstantinos Stephanopoulos
Independent

An indirect election for the position of President of the Hellenic Republic was held by the Hellenic Parliament on 8 February 2000.

Incumbent President Konstantinos Stephanopoulos was elected on the first ballot with 269 votes out of 298, with the support of the two major parties, the ruling PASOK and New Democracy, against 10 votes for Synaspismos' candidate Leonidas Kyrkos. The 19 MPs of the Communist Party of Greece and DIKKI voted "present", and two were absent. Stephanopoulos' re-election to the presidency marked the first time in the history of the Third Hellenic Republic that the ruling party and the main opposition party both supported the same candidate, as well as the first time that an incumbent President was re-elected.

== Results ==
Candidate	Party	First round	
Candidate	Party	Votes	%
Konstantinos Stephanopoulos	Independent	269	96.41
Leonidas Kyrkos	Synaspismos	10	3.59
Valid votes		279	93.62
Abstentions		19	6.38
Voters		298	100
Absentees		2	0.66
Total		300	98.34
