= Katerina Khristoforidou =

Greek gymnast (born 1984)

Personal information
- Nationality: Greek
- Born: 4 April 1984 (age 40); Thessaloniki, Greece

Sport
- Sport: Gymnastics

Katerina Khristoforidou (born 4 April 1984) is a Greek gymnast. She competed at the 2000 Summer Olympics.
