= Storm Athina =

October 2021 European windstorm in Europe

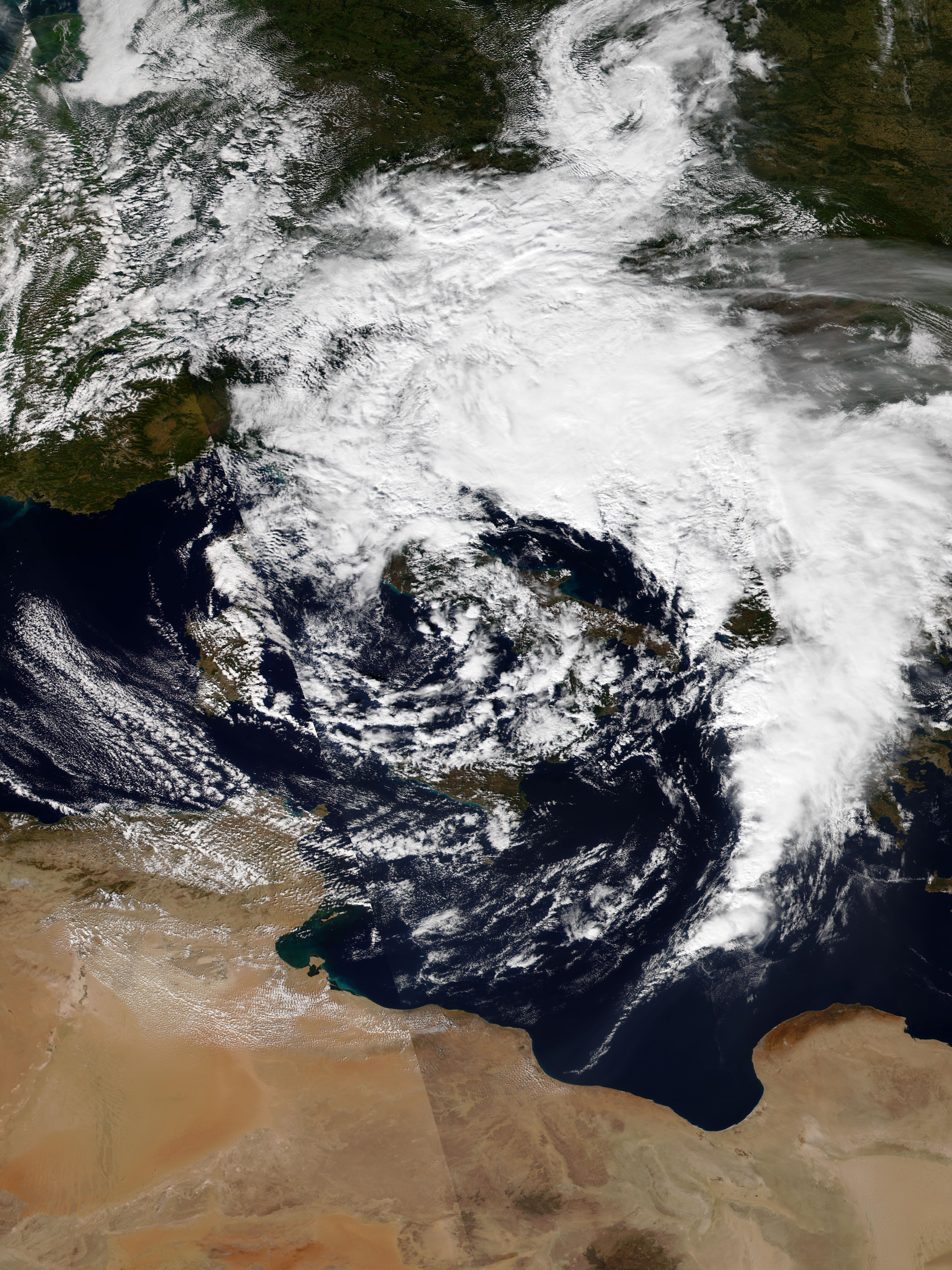
- Storm Athina over Italy on 7 October

Meteorological history
- Formed: 4 October 2021
- Dissipated: 11 October 2021

Extratropical cyclone
- Lowest pressure: 1,010 mb (1,010 hPa)
- Maximum rainfall: >900 mm (35 in) in Rossiglione

Overall effects
- Damage: >$80 million (2021 USD)
- Areas affected: Spain, Italy, Greece, Slovenia, Croatia, Bosnia and Herzegovina, Serbia, Montenegro, North Macedonia, Albania
- Part of the 2021–22 European windstorm season

Storm Athina was an early extratropical cyclone that was most notable for its damages it brought to Greece and Italy during early-October 2021. The first storm to be officially named in conjunction with the naming list of the former, Israel and Cyprus, Athina formed on 6 October over central Italy before taking an erratic track across the country and into the Ionian Sea, until near Albania and Greece. It then slowly weakened before it dissipated on 11 October as it moved over the latter and emerging into the Aegean Sea. The Free University of Berlin tracked the system as Christian into its initial and dissipating stages.

The precursor to Athina caused record-heavy rainfall in Italy's Liguria Region, where Rossiglione collected over 900 mm (35 in) in an 12-hour period and Savona at 540 mm (21 in), causing flash floods and a landslide. A red alert was placed for Savona and Genoa, along with these effects. Damages in these areas were estimated by the Aon Benfield at more than $80 million (2021 USD). Many rescues across the country and nearby Greece were also performed. Ships were moored, schools were closed and several flights were diverted due to Athina. Reports of hailstorms were also documented on these countries. Overall, no deaths were reported but there was an unknown number of injuries in Catania, Italy.

After the storm, over €20 million of emergency grant was approved for Evia in Greece, one of areas in Greece that was the worst-affected of the storm. Mantoudi-Limni-Agia Anna's residents also asked for financial aid while Agia in Larissa was requested to be placed on state of calamity due to the aftermath of Athina.

== Meteorological history ==
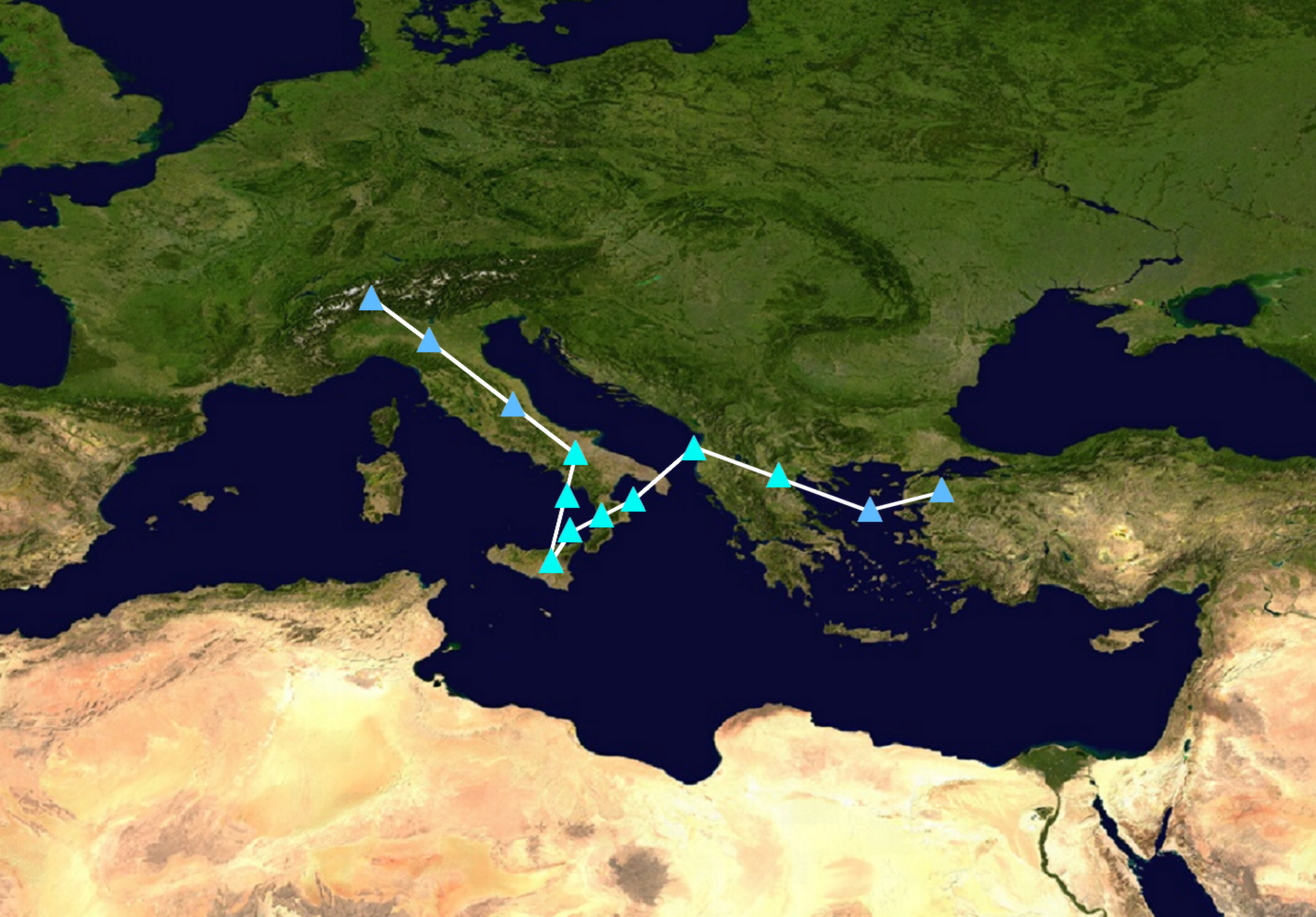
Map plotting the storm's track and intensity, according to the Saffir–Simpson scale Map key Saffir–Simpson scale Tropical depression (≤38 mph, ≤62 km/h) Tropical storm (39–73 mph, 63–118 km/h) Category 1 (74–95 mph, 119–153 km/h) Category 2 (96–110 mph, 154–177 km/h) Category 3 (111–129 mph, 178–208 km/h) Category 4 (130–156 mph, 209–251 km/h) Category 5 (≥157 mph, ≥252 km/h) Unknown Storm type Tropical cyclone Subtropical cyclone Extratropical cyclone, remnant low, tropical disturbance, or monsoon depression

The predecessor to Athina can be traced back along the Atlantic Ocean near Spain from an occluded front on 1 October, in which the Free University of Berlin named it Benni. On the next day, while crossing through the Iberian Peninsula, the FUB named the front Christian before it emerged onto the Balearic Sea and into the Mediterranean Sea on 3 October, still connected to the frontal system of Benni which is at that time, located over the North Sea. Christian moved over Italy on 4 October as it started to move northwestwards, this time now connected to another occluded front, in which the FUB named as Engelbert. It then moved slightly eastwards over its central portion on the next day before stalling there on 6 October. At this time, a trough of warm air aloft (trowal) is centered over the Mediterranean Sea, extending from near Albania, to the Ionian Sea over the Libyan coast. At that day, the Hellenic National Meteorological Service of Greece officially named it Athina, the first from the agency's collaborated naming lists. Its center subsequently entered the Ionian Sea before moving back again into southern Italy, where it stalled there again. Athina then moved northeastwards as a weakening system, with its center being located near Albania on 10 October before both the HNMS and FUB declared Athina to be dissipated over the next day as it accelerated over Greece and entered the Aegean Sea.

== Impacts ==
=== Greece ===
After the Hellenic National Meteorological Service named the storm Athina, heavy rain and strong gusts were predicted across the country, particularly in the south and the Ionian Islands, beginning on October 6. The weather service issued weather warnings for the areas that may be affected. As a preparation, several ships along Greece's Zakynthos and Kefalonia ports were tied into safety while all primary and secondary schools in Corfu and Paxos were closed ahead of time. Many ship operations were also affected by the storm and citizens along the storm's course received 112 text warnings to prepare for Athina.

Corfu and Paxos were the first regions in Greece to be hit by the storm's heavy rains and severe gusts. There was some minor street flooding in the former, but no damage reports were reported on any of the two islands. Both Zagora and Pelion experienced approximately 700 mm (28 in) of rain, which is more than twice the quantity of rain that fell in Athens. Four flights were diverted into the capital or to other public airports throughout the country. The reduced visibility caused by Athina was blamed by the management of Corfu International Airport. The storm's rainfall also spawned several landslides that disrupted traffic along the areas of Pyli and Kalabaka while its winds downed trees that damaged cars in Thessaloniki. Including the area, three more places were raided by fire marshall authorities over calls for help to remove obstructing trees and other objects strewn on public roads. Euboea (also known as Evia) had significant damage to its roads, as well as flash floods that briefly halted transportation. A beach in Mantoudi-Limni-Agia Anna, a municipality in central Greece, was destroyed by floods, while fields were flooded. Due to Athena's impact, its mayor advised residents to avoid unnecessary travel. Hailstorms were also reported along the Nileos and Strofilia communities. Northern Evia, Magnesia Prefecture, and western Peloponnese were the hardest hit by the storm, with the floods alone causing significant damage. Authorities in the villages of Achladi, Kotsikia, and Agia Anna tried to rescue stranded residents from their already-flooded homes, but no casualties were reported. The system also caused minor flooding in Athens, as the rains broke a section of a mountain in Makrirrachi. The fire department received over 157 calls for assistance, most of which were for tree or water pump destruction.

Following the storm, a €20 million ($23.209 million, 2021 USD) emergency grant was announced for northern Evia's rehabilitation. Following the disaster in the municipality, the badly impacted residents of Mantoudi-Limni-Agia Anna also requested governmental assistance. Due to the extensive devastation left by Athina, Agia inLarissa were also placed under a request for the area to be declared a state of emergency.

=== Italy ===
Athina's predecessor's heavy rainfall caused major flooding across Liguria, creating several disruptions. On October 4, Rossiglione received 900 mm (35 in)of rain while Savona received 540 mm (21 in), both records. It shattered the previous record of 472 mm (18.6 in) set in November 2011 in the same area. Due to the rainfall, three river banks overflowed, causing several rescues and floods in the cities and municipalities surrounding the reservoirs. As a result of these effects, railway and transportation operations were seriously affected. As a result, schools and other public places, particularly in Genoa, were temporarily closed to the public. In addition, a high river current in Quiliano washed out a public bridge.

As a result of Athina's precursor, its Civil Protection authority issued the highest warning for disaster effects, a red alert for Savona and Genoa. Italian President Giovanni Toti also urged its people to stop travelling to places that are affected by the storm, when it's unnecessary. Thirty rescues were carried out in Savona alone for trapped and stranded residents. In Ponteinvrea, 5 households were relocated to safety, while rescue workers assisted 13 motorists in reaching safe areas over Rossiglione. 29 persons in Ovada, Alessandria were also rescued due to the Orba River breaking its banks. Landslides were also reported in Rossiglione's mountainous areas, and many tree twigs and branches blocked many public roads, forcing them to close temporarily. Hail was also observed in some sections of the country hit by the storm. Electricity was also briefly disrupted in Sicily, and planes were diverted to other airports owing to the storm along the Palermo Falcone Borsellino Airport. Catania also reported some injuries, but no other details were provided.

== See also ==
- 2021-22 European windstorm season
