= Ioannis Patsantaras =

Retired Hellenic Air Force officer

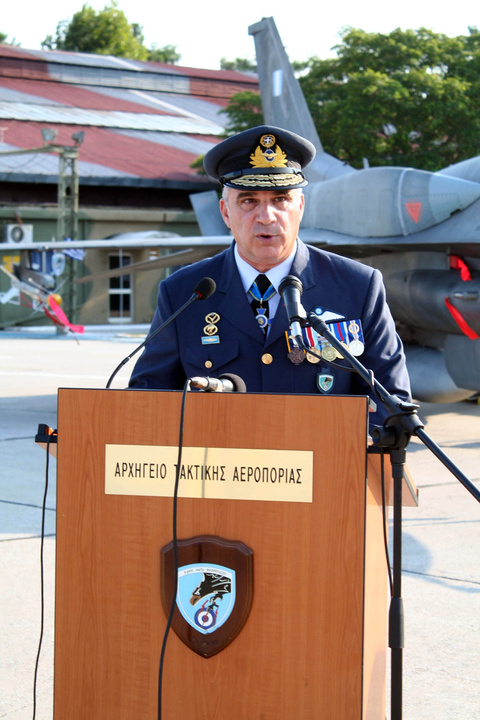
- Born: 1954 (age 71–72); Arachova, Boeotia
- Allegiance: Greece
- Branch: Hellenic Air Force
- Service years: 1977-2010
- Rank: Air marshal
- Commands: Chief of Tactical Air Force Comnmand

Air Marshal Ioannis Patsantaras (Greek: Ιωάννης Πατσαντάρας; born 1954) is a retired Hellenic Air Force officer who served as commander of the Hellenic Tactical Air Force Command. He has served as mayor of Distomo-Arachova-Antikyra from 2011 to 2014.

== Biography ==
He was born in 1954 in Arachova, Boeotia. In September 1973 he entered the Hellenic Air Force Academy, and graduated in June 1977. During his career, he served in various operational units of the Air Force. From 1995 to 1999, he served in the presidency of the Hellenic Republic (Military Office) as an aide-de-camp of President Konstantinos Stephanopoulos.
