= Apostolos Kaklamanis =

Greek politician (born 1936)

- Απόστολος Κακλαμάνης
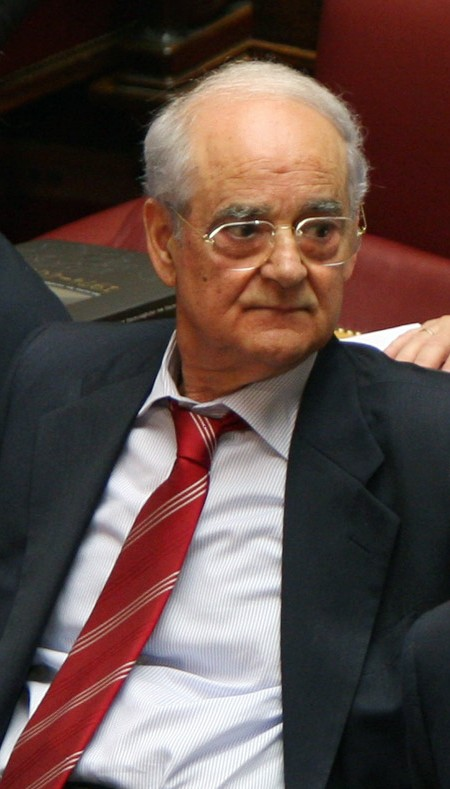
- Kaklamanis in 2008

5th Speaker of the Hellenic Parliament
- In office 22 October 1993 – 19 March 2004
- Preceded by: Athanasios Tsaldaris
- Succeeded by: Anna Benaki-Psarouda

Minister of National Education and Religious Affairs
- In office 9 May 1988 – 22 June 1988
- Prime Minister: Andreas Papandreou
- Preceded by: Antonis Tritsis
- Succeeded by: George Papandreou
- In office 5 July 1982 – 25 April 1986
- Prime Minister: Andreas Papandreou
- Preceded by: Eleftherios Veryvakis
- Succeeded by: Antonis Tritsis

Minister of Justice
- In office 25 April 1986 – 5 February 1987
- Prime Minister: Andreas Papandreou
- Preceded by: Georgios-Alexandros Mangakis
- Succeeded by: Eleftherios Veryvakis

Personal details
- Born: 7 September 1936 (age 90) Lefkada, Greece
- Party: Panhellenic Socialist Movement
- Education: University of Athens
- Website: Official website

Apostolos Kaklamanis (Greek: Απόστολος Κακλαμάνης) (born 7 September 1936) is a Greek politician and member of the Greek Parliament for the Panhellenic Socialist Movement (PASOK) for the Athens B constituency.

He has been elected as a PASOK MP in all the general elections since 1974.

He speaks English.

He has held the following government posts:

- Minister of Employment (2 terms)
- Minister for National Education and Religious Affairs (2 terms)
- Minister for Justice
- Minister for Research and Technology
- Minister for Health and Social Solidarity
- Deputy Minister to the Presidency

He was Speaker of the Hellenic Parliament from 22 October 1993 to 19 March 2004.

Political offices
Preceded by Eleftherios Veryvakis	Minister of National Education and Religious Affairs; 1982–1986	Succeeded by Antonis Tritsis
Preceded by Georgios-Alexandros Mangakis	Minister of Justice; 1986–1987	Succeeded by Eleftherios Veryvakis
Preceded by Antonis Tritsis	Minister of National Education and Religious Affairs; 1988	Succeeded by George Papandreou
Preceded by Athanasios Tsaldaris	Speaker of the Hellenic Parliament; 1993–2004	Succeeded by Anna Benaki-Psarouda
Order of precedence
Preceded by Ioannis Sarmas as Former Prime Minister	Order of precedence of Greece; Former Speaker	Succeeded by Vyron Polydoras as Former Speaker
