= Konstantinos Stephanopoulos =

President of Greece from 1995 to 2005

- Κωνσταντίνος Στεφανόπουλος
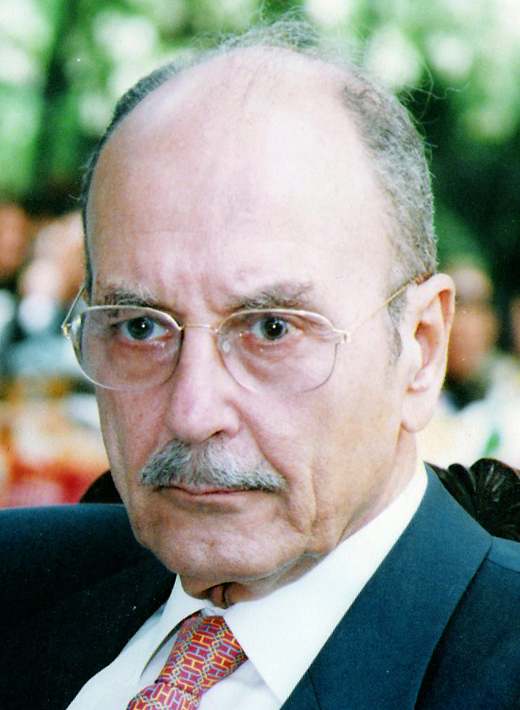
- Stephanopoulos in 2000

President of Greece
- In office 10 March 1995 – 12 March 2005
- Prime Minister: Andreas Papandreou; Costas Simitis; Kostas Karamanlis
- Preceded by: Konstantinos Karamanlis
- Succeeded by: Karolos Papoulias

Minister of the Presidency
- In office 28 November 1977 – 21 October 1981
- Prime Minister: Konstantinos Karamanlis; Georgios Rallis
- Preceded by: Georgios Rallis
- Succeeded by: Menios Koutsogiorgas

Minister of Social Services
- In office 10 September 1976 – 28 November 1977
- Prime Minister: Konstantinos Karamanlis
- Preceded by: Konstantinos Chrysanthopoulos
- Succeeded by: Spyridon Doxiadis

Minister of the Interior
- In office 21 November 1974 – 10 September 1976
- Prime Minister: Konstantinos Karamanlis
- Preceded by: Christoforos Stratos
- Succeeded by: Ippokratis Iordanoglou

Personal details
- Born: 15 August 1926 Patras, Greece
- Died: 20 November 2016 (aged 90) Athens, Greece
- Resting place: First Cemetery of Patras
- Party: Independent (1994–2016)
- Other political affiliations: National Radical Union (1958–1967); New Democracy (1974–1985); Democratic Renewal (1985–1994)
- Spouse: Evgenia Stephanopoulou (m. 1959; died 1988)
- Children: 3
- Education: National and Kapodistrian University of Athens

Konstantinos "Kostis" Stephanopoulos (Greek: Κωνσταντίνος (Κωστής) Στεφανόπουλος, 15 August 1926 – 20 November 2016) was a Greek conservative politician who served two consecutive terms as the president of Greece from 1995 to 2005.

== Life and career ==
Stephanopoulos was born in Patras on 15 August 1926 to the lawyer, radiologist, and Member of Parliament Dimitrios Stephanopoulos, and Vrisiis Philopoulou. After attending the Saint Andrew school of Patras, he studied law at Athens University. He practiced law from 1954 until 1974 as a member of the Patras Bar Association.

He first stood for election in 1958, with the National Radical Union and was elected for the first time as MP for Achaea Prefecture in 1964. He was re-elected for the same constituency for New Democracy (ND) in 1974, 1977, 1981 and 1985. He served as ND parliamentary secretary and parliamentary spokesman from 1981 to 1985.

In 1974, Stephanopoulos was appointed Deputy Minister of Commerce in the National Unity government of Constantine Karamanlis. For the next seven years, he served in a number of ministerial posts in New Democracy governments; Minister for the Interior from November 1974 to September 1976; Minister for Social Services from September 1976 to November 1977 and Minister for the Presidency from 1977 to 1981.

In August 1985 he resigned from ND after a disagreement with Konstantinos Mitsotakis and on 6 September formed Democratic Renewal (DIANA). He was elected Member of Parliament for Athens in the 1989 elections while continuing as the leader of DIANA, until it disbanded in June 1994.

On 8 March 1995, after being nominated by the conservative Political Spring party and supported by the ruling Panhellenic Socialist Movement (PASOK), he was elected President of Greece, winning the election on a third ballot of MPs with 181 votes. He was the fifth person to hold the post since the restoration of democratic rule in 1974. He was re-elected on 8 February 2000 on the first ballot, after receiving the support of 269 of the 298 MPs present. He remained in office until 2 March 2005, when he was succeeded by Karolos Papoulias.

As a President he was known for his low-key profile, unifying approach to current and international affairs, and gentlemanly behaviour. During his presidency, he was consistently the most popular public figure in Greece.

As head of state of the host country in the Opening Ceremony, he is the first President of the Hellenic Republic officially declare open the 2004 Summer Olympics of Athens, the Olympic Homecoming of the modern era on 13 August 2004. Stephanopoulos was accompanied by Adjutant to the President of the Hellenic Republic, Colonel Georgios Dritsakos of the Hellenic Air Force.

Stephanopoulos died in Henry Dunant Hospital, Athens, on 20 November 2016 at the age of 90. He had been hospitalised three days earlier, suffering from fever and severe respiratory difficulty, which later emerged as pneumonia.

== Family ==
Stephanopoulos was married for 29 years to Tzeni Stephanopoulou, who died in 1988. The couple had three children.

== Honours and awards ==
Stephanopoulos received many honorary awards and the highest decorations of foreign countries. He was an honorary citizen of many Greek towns.

- Poland : Order of the White Eagle (1996)
- Lithuania : Grand Cross of the Order of Vytautas the Great (21 February 1997)
- Philippines : Order of Sikatuna (23 June 1997)
- Spain : Collar of the Order of Charles III (22 May 1998)
- Croatia : Grand Order of King Tomislav (3 December 1998)
- Slovenia : Golden Order of Freedom (1999).
- Austria : Grand Star of the Decoration of Honour for Services to the Republic of Austria (1999)
- Romania : Collar of Order of the Star of Romania (1999)
- Sweden : Knight of the Royal Order of the Seraphim (24 April 1999)
- Estonia : Collar of the Order of the Cross of Terra Mariana (4 May 1999)
- Lithuania : Grand Cross of the Order of the Lithuanian Grand Duke Gediminas (1 July 1999)
- Slovakia : Grand Cross (or 1st Class) of the Order of the White Double Cross (2000)
- Portugal : Grand Collar of the Order of Prince Henry (21 February 2000)
- Italy : Knight Grand Cross with Grand Cordon of the Order of Merit of the Italian Republic (23 January 2001)
- Iceland : Knight Grand Cross of the Order of the Falcon (18 September 2001)
- Vatican : Knight with the Collar of the Order of Pope Pius IX (2002)
- Malta : National Order of Merit (Malta) (5 September 2002)
- Norway : Grand Cross of the Order of St. Olav (7 June 2004)
- Luxembourg : Knight of the Order of the Gold Lion of the House of Nassau
- Latvia : Grand Cross Order of the Three Stars
- Albania : Received a copy of the key of the city of Tirana on the occasion of his state visit to Albania.
- Azerbaijan : Honorary Doctor Degree, Azerbaijan State University of Economics

Political offices
| Preceded by Panagiotis Zeppos | Minister of the Interior; 1974–1976 | Succeeded by Ippokratis Iordanoglou |
| Preceded by Konstantinos Chrysanthopoulos | Minister of Social Services; 1976–1977 | Succeeded by Spyridon Doxiadis |
| Preceded by Georgios Rallis | Minister of the Presidency; 1977–1981 | Succeeded by Menios Koutsogiorgas |
| Preceded by Konstantinos Karamanlis | President of Greece; 1995–2005 | Succeeded by Karolos Papoulias |
Party political offices
| New political party | President of Democratic Renewal; 1985–1994 | Party disbanded |
