= Territorial evolution of Greece =

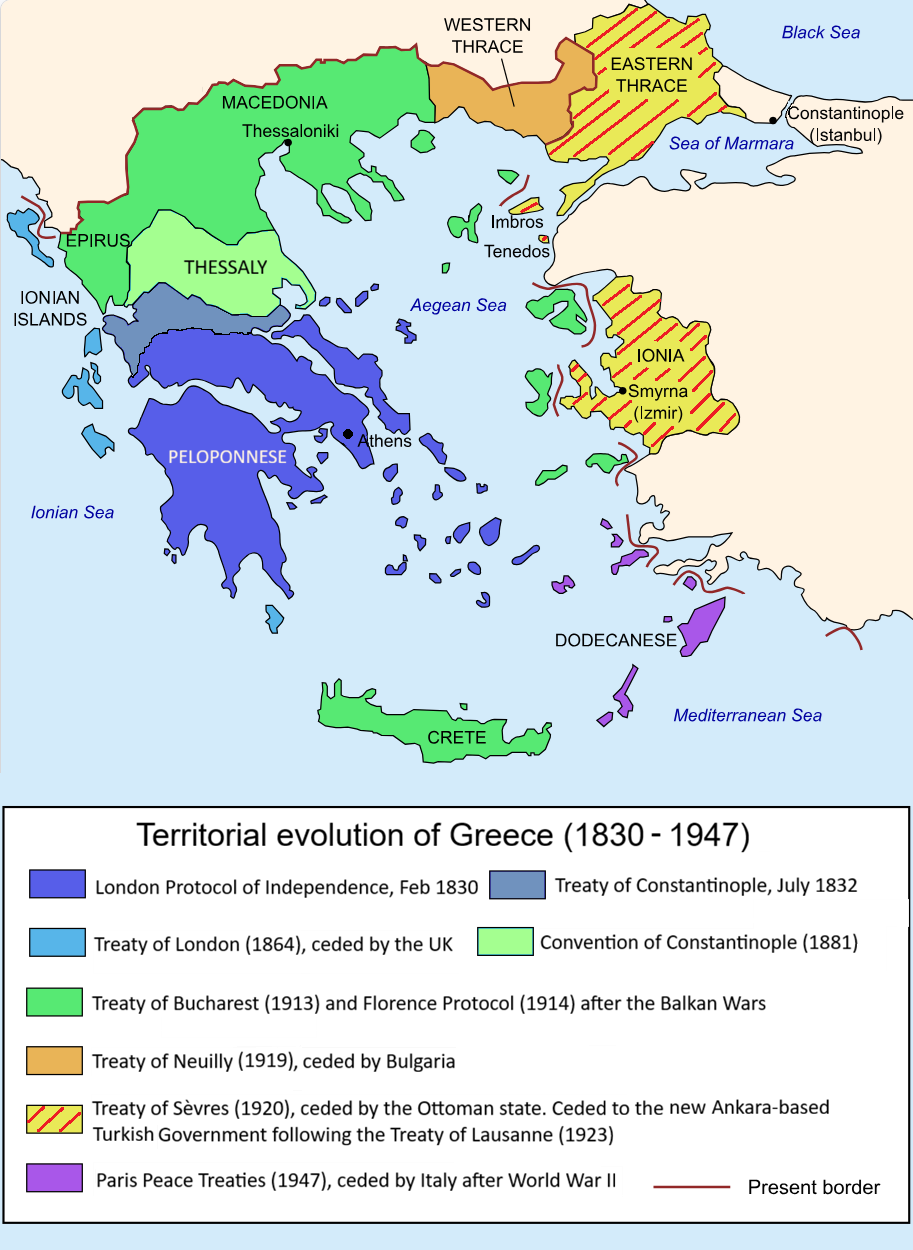
Map of the territorial evolution of Greece

The borders of the modern state of Greece have changed several times between 1830, when the London Protocol recognised a sovereign Greek state bordering the Ottoman Empire, and 1947, when Italy ceded the Dodecanese islands under the Paris Peace Treaties, following its defeat in the Second World War.

== First borders of the Greek state ==
At the Poros Conference in 1828, a few months after the Battle of Navarino, the borders of the Greek state were decided by the Greek revolutionaries.

Diplomat and first Governor of Greece Ioannis Kapodistrias presented two plans for the land border, one on the Arta–Volos line and one on the Haliacmon–Metsovo–Ionian Sea line.

The negotiations led to the signing of the London Protocol (1829) by the three European Great Powers, which established an autonomous, but tributary Greek state under Ottoman suzerainty. This state would have a land border to the north on the Arta–Volos line. The protocol was never implemented.

The British strongly opposed the border in Western Greece due to their interest in keeping the mainland at a distance from the Ionian coastline and the British protectorate of the Ionian Islands, so that it did not encourage aspirations in the islands

The London Protocol of Independence signed on 3 February 1830, set the first land border of independent Greece with the Ottoman Empire on the Aspropotamos–Spercheios line, marked by the route of two rivers and a series of lakes and mountain summits in Central Greece.

== Territorial evolution in the 19th century ==
Following the refusal of Prince Leopold of Belgium to assume the throne of Greece as provided for by the 1830 London Protocol, and the assassination of Ioannis Kapodistrias, the first Governor of Greece, in 1831, there was political instability in the country.

Negotiations on the borders of the newly established state resumed.

The Treaty of Constantinople (1832), confirmed at the London Conference of 1832 established the new land border of the Kingdom of Greece on the Ambracian – Pagasetic line, otherwise known as Arta–Volos line. The treaty left the two towns of Arta and Volos outside the Greek territory, just north of the border with the Ottoman Empire.

On 2 May 1864, with the (Treaty of London) the Ionian Islands were ceded by the United Kingdom to the Kingdom of Greece. This followed the accession of King George I to the Greek throne the previous year and a change in British Foreign policy.

On 2 July 1881 (Convention of Constantinople) new lands, including most of modern Thessaly and the Arta region, were added to the Greek territory. The treaty was signed not after military conflict but following prolonged negotiations with the Ottomans, which took place under the auspices of the Great Powers. About 40,000 Muslims lived in Thessaly prior to the region's annexation to Greece, and both the Ottoman Empire and the Great Powers forced the Greek state to protect the rights of the Muslim population through special provisions.

On 4 December 1897, the (Treaty of Constantinople) which followed the Greco-Turkish War of 1897, brought minor territorial adjustments to the Greco-Ottoman border in favour of the Ottomans. Crete also became an autonomous state with a prince as high commissioner.

== Territorial evolution in the 20th century ==
On 30 May 1913 (Treaty of London), following the First Balkan War, Greece secures much of Macedonia and Epirus, as well as Crete; the status of Northern Epirus and the islands of the eastern Aegean Sea, occupied by the Greek army, remain undetermined. The Greek gains are recognized by the Ottoman Empire in the Treaty of Athens on 14 November 1913.

On 1 June 1913 (Greek–Serbian Treaty of Peace, Friendship and Mutual Protection), the delineation of the Greek–Serbian border (now the border between Greece and North Macedonia) came into effect.

On 10 August 1913 with the signing of the (Treaty of Bucharest), in the aftermath of the Second Balkan War, Greece secures eastern Macedonia from Bulgaria, up to Kavala.

On 17 December 1913 (Treaty of Florence (1913)): The Great Powers assign Northern Epirus to Albania, and order Greek troops to leave.

On 13 February 1914 (Protocol of Florence) The Great Powers assign the islands of the eastern Aegean (apart from the Italian-occupied Dodecanese) to Greece. Imbros, Tenedos, and Kastellorizo are returned to the Ottoman Empire.

On 27 November 1919 (Treaty of Neuilly), Western Thrace, formerly part of Bulgaria, is annexed to Greece.

On 10 August 1920 (Treaty of Sèvres): Eastern Thrace up to the Chataldja is annexed to Greece. A year later, following the creation of electoral registers, residents of the area take part in the 1920 Greek elections. According to the provisions of the treaty, the Smyrna Zone, a major part of what was called Ionia by the Greeks, is placed under temporary administration of the Greek government for five years, after which a plebiscite would determine its future fate. This never took place due to the outcome Greco-Turkish War.

On 24 July 1923 (Treaty of Lausanne): Following the Greco-Turkish War of 1919–1922, the Treaty of Sèvres is annulled. Eastern Thrace and Smyrna return under Turkish control, as well as the Karagach Triangle in lieu of reparations. A Greco-Turkish population exchange is agreed.

On 10 February 1947, following the signing of the (Treaty of Paris), the Dodecanese in south-eastern Aegean were ceded to Greece. The Kastelorizo in Eastern Mediterranean also became part of the Greek territory.
