= Greek nationalism =

Ideology perceiving Greeks as a nation

The national flag of Greece was officially adopted by the First National Assembly at Epidaurus on 13 January 1822. There is a blue canton in the upper hoist-side corner bearing a white cross; the cross symbolises Eastern Orthodox Christianity.

Greek nationalism, otherwise referred to as Hellenic nationalism, refers to the nationalism of Greeks and Greek culture. As an ideology, Greek nationalism originated and evolved in classical Greece. In modern times, Greek nationalism became a major political movement beginning in the early 19th century, which culminated in the Greek War of Independence (1821–1829) against the Ottoman Empire and the establishment of the first independent Greek state, the First Hellenic Republic (1822–1832).

Greek nationalism became also a potent movement in the Kingdom of Greece shortly prior to and during World War I, when the Greeks, inspired by the Megali Idea, managed to liberate parts of Greece during the Balkan Wars, and briefly occupied the region of Smyrna after World War I, before it was retaken by the Turks.

Greek nationalism was also the main ideology of two dictatorial regimes in Greece during the 20th century: the 4th of August Regime (1936–1941) and the Greek military junta (1967–1974). Today, Greek Cypriot nationalism remains important in the Greco-Turkish dispute over Cyprus, among other territorial disputes.

== History ==
=== Background ===
==== Ancient Greece ====
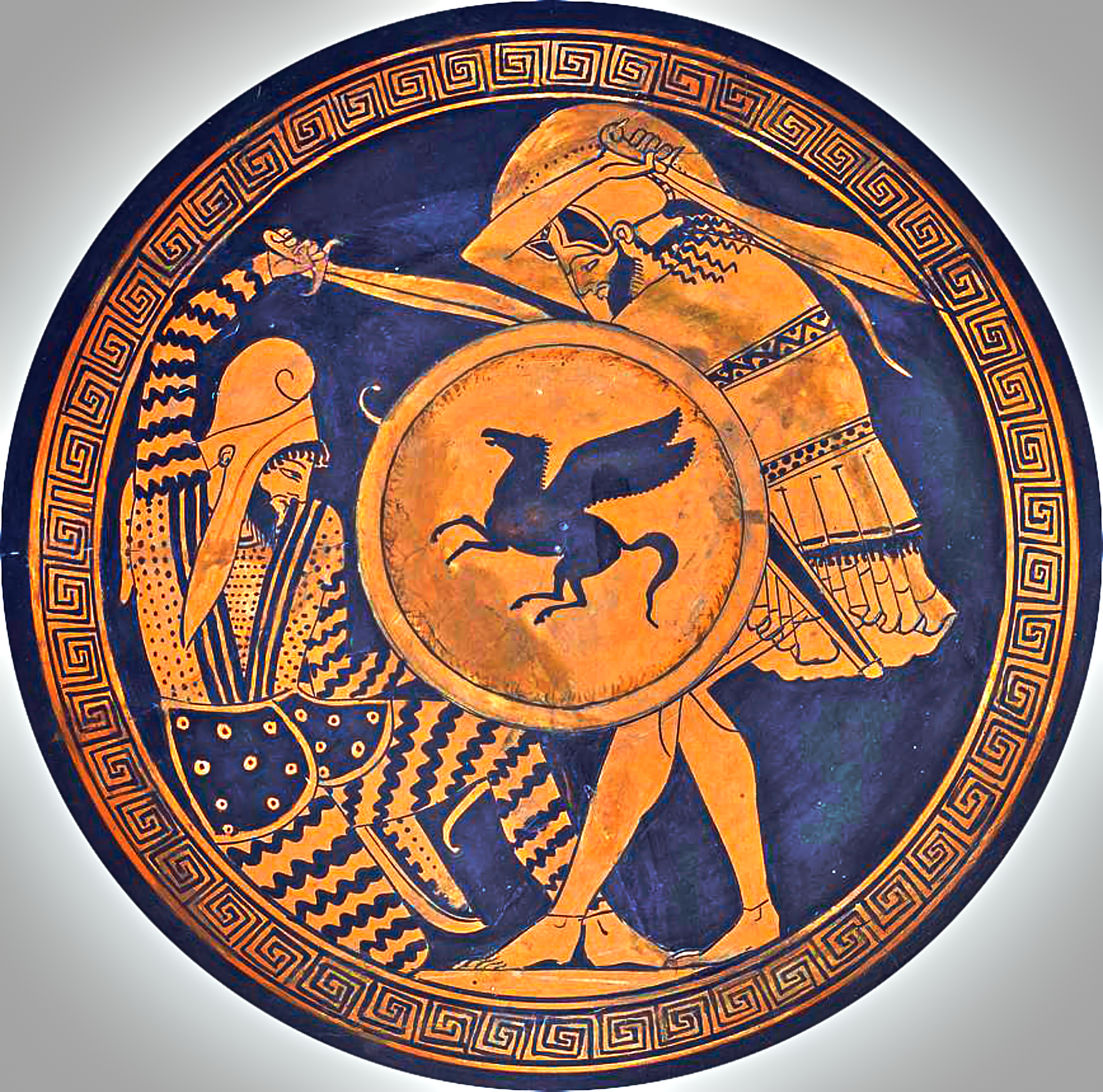
Greek hoplite (right) and Persian warrior (left) depicted fighting, on an ancient kylix (5th century BCE)

The establishment of Panhellenic religious sanctuaries in Ancient Greece served as an essential component in the growth and self-consciousness of Hellenic nationalism. During the Greco-Persian Wars of the 5th century BCE, Greek nationalism was formally established though mainly as an ideology rather than a political reality, since some Greek city-states were still allied with the Persian Empire. Aristotle and Hippocrates offered a theoretical approach on the superiority of the Greek tribes. The establishment of the ancient Panhellenic Games is often seen as the first example of ethnic nationalism and view of a common heritage and identity.

The Greek alliance led by Sparta during the Second Persian invasion of Greece, the Athenian-led Delian League under Cimon, the Spartan king Agesilaus II, and the Hellenic League led by Philip II of Macedon and then Alexander the Great, all self-presented as defenders of the Greeks against the Persians. Philip was initially urged by Isocrates in 346 BCE to unify all of Greece against the Persian Empire.

After the Battle of Chaeronea (338 BCE), the League of Corinth was formed and controlled by Philip. Alexander utilized his father's league when planning his Panhellenic invasion of Asia Minor and Persia to expand Macedon and take revenge on the Persian Empire. During the Hellenistic period, some Antigonid rulers of Macedon shortly revived the league, otherwise known as the "Hellenic Alliance". Hellenistic rulers such as Pyrrhus of Epirus, Philip V of Macedon, Antiochus the Great, Perseus of Macedon, and Mithridates of Pontus presented themselves as champions of Greek liberty against the rising Roman Republic.

==== Byzantine Empire ====
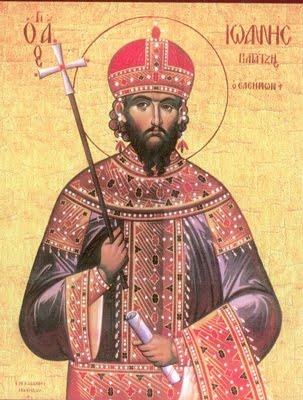
St. John III Doukas Vatatzes the Merciful King, Emperor of the Romans and "Father of the Greeks".

During the times of the Eastern Roman Empire and after the capture of Constantinople in 1204 by the Latin Crusaders, the Nicene Emperor John III Doukas Vatatzes made extensive use of the words genos (Greek: γένος, génos: "nation"), Hellene (Greek: Ἑλληνι, Élleni: "Greek"), and Hellas (Greek: Ἑλλάς, Éllás: "Greece") together in his correspondence with the Pope. John acknowledged that he was Greek, although bearing the royal title of Emperor of the Romans: "the Greeks are the only heirs and successors of Constantine", he wrote. In similar fashion John’s son Theodore II, acc. 1254, who took some interest in the physical heritage of Antiquity, referred to his whole realm as "Hellas" and a "Hellenic dominion". The generations after John looked back upon him as "the Father of the Greeks". When the Byzantine Empire was ruled by the Paleologi dynasty (1261–1453), a new era of Greek patriotism emerged, accompanied by a turning back to Ancient Greece. Some prominent personalities at the time also proposed changing the Imperial title from "basileus and autocrat of the Romans" to "Emperor of the Hellenes".

=== Modern era ===
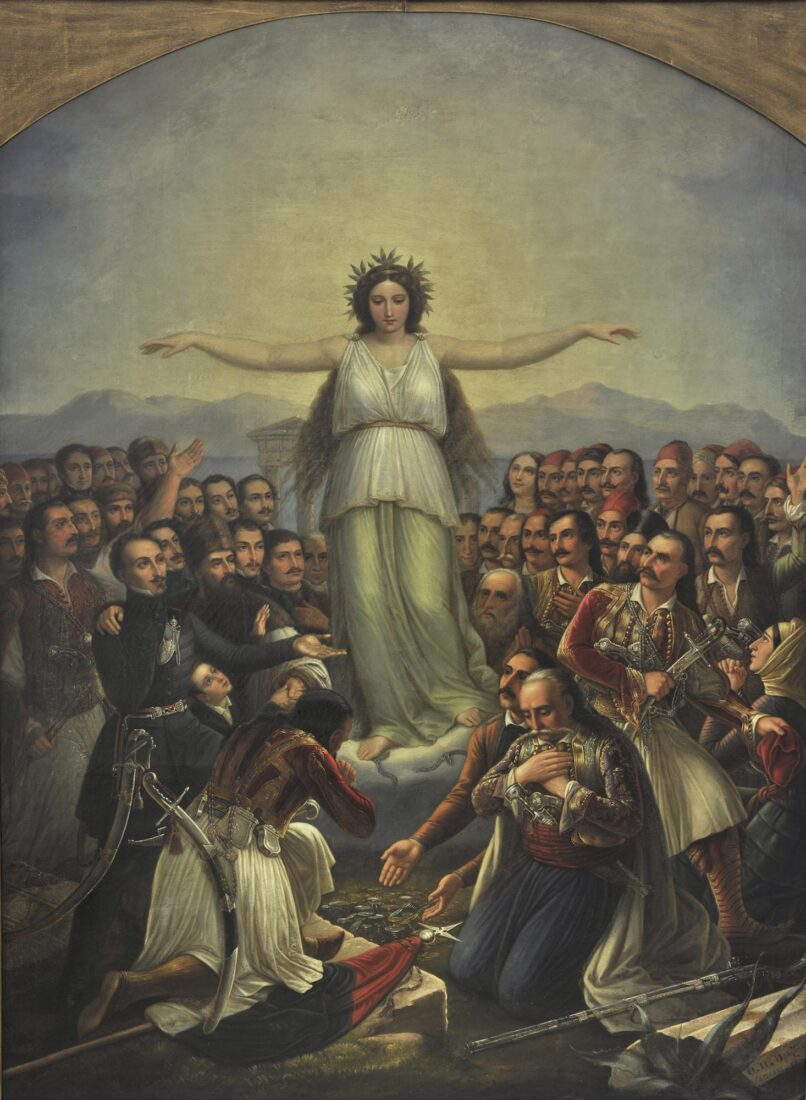
Grateful Hellas, painting by Theodoros Vryzakis (1858), National Historical Museum, Athens. Greece personified as a woman, depicted with revolutionaries who participated in the Greek War of Independence.

The last Byzantine Emperor Constantine XI Palaiologos became known in later Greek folklore as "The Marble Emperor" (Greek: Μαρμαρωμένος Βασιλιάς, Marmaroménos Vasiliás lit. 'Emperor turned into Marble'). This reflected a popular legend that Constantine had not actually died, but had been rescued by an angel and turned into marble, hidden beneath the Golden Gate of Constantinople awaiting a call from God to be restored to life and reconquer both the city and the old empire.

The Romantic enthusiasm for Greece's glorious past and cultural heritage constituted an element that was present in the Greek nationalist movement that led to the Greek War of Independence (1821–1829) against the Ottoman Empire and the establishment of the first independent Greek state, the First Hellenic Republic (1822–1832), after four centuries of Ottoman rule. The movement's calling for enosis (the incorporation of disparate Greek-populated territories into a greater Greek state) resulted in the accession of Ionian Islands (1864), Thessaly (1881), Crete, Greek Macedonia, Epirus, and most of the North Aegean islands (1912–1913), Western Thrace (1920), and finally the Dodecanese (1947) to the Kingdom of Greece (1832–1924). The Megali Idea of Greek irredentism ended after the Greco-Turkish War (1919–1922) and the population exchange between Greece and Turkey. During the troubled interwar years, some Greek nationalists viewed Orthodox Christian Albanians, Aromanians, and Bulgarians as communities that could be assimilated into the Greek nation.

Calls for enosis were also a feature of Cypriot politics during British rule in Cyprus. After the Treaty of Lausanne (1923), Greco-Turkish relations have been characterized by tension between Greek and Turkish nationalism especially for the Cyprus problem, culminating in the Turkish invasion of Cyprus (1974). Historians Erik Sjöberg and Andrekos Varnava argue that Greek nationalism, specifically in the form of Identity politics and memory-making, was a primary driver in the "construction" of the Greek genocide as a collectivist historical fact.

== Gallery ==
Traditional flag used from 1769 to the Greek War of Independence.

Flag of the Filiki Eteria (1814), a secret organization which planned to overthrow the Ottoman rule and establish an independent Greek State.

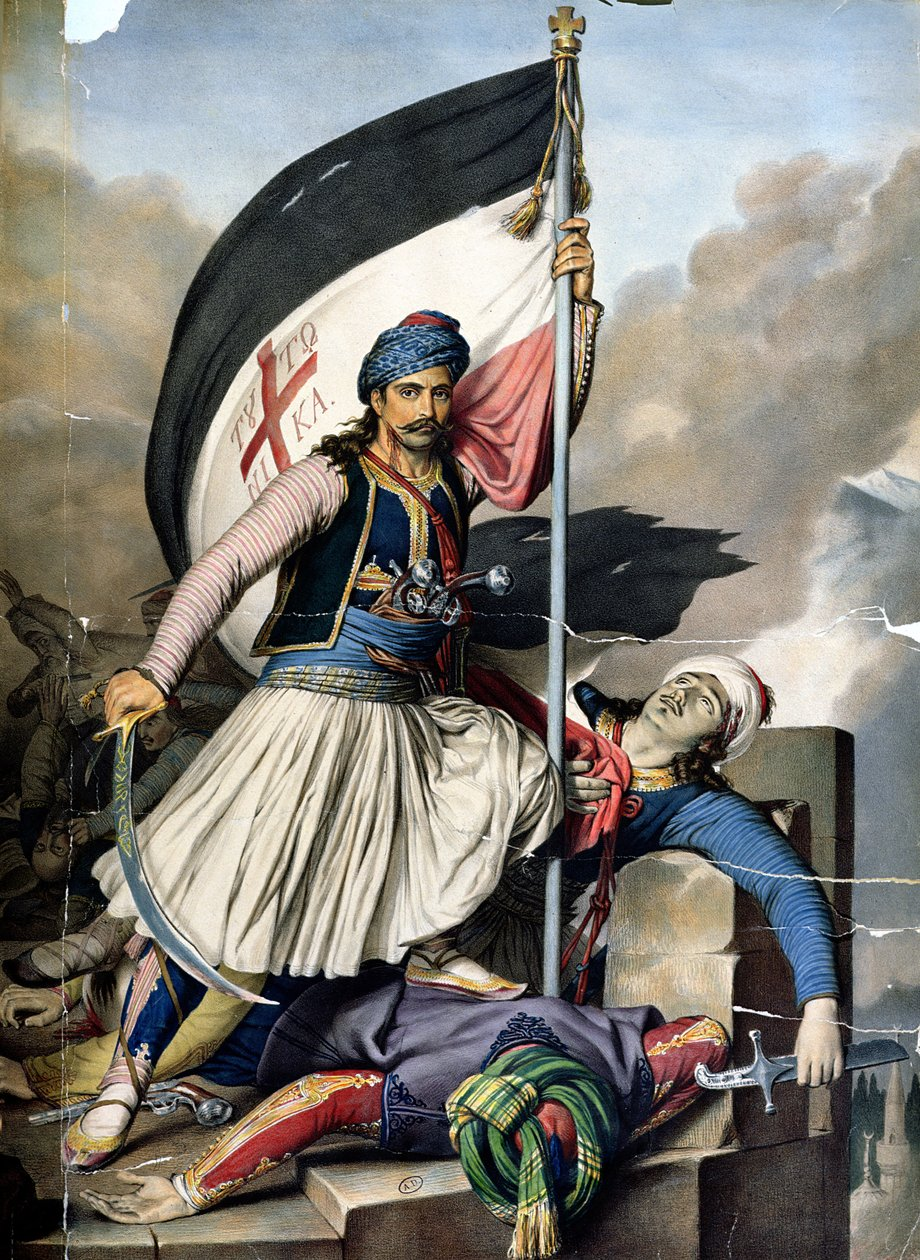
Louis Dupré's depiction of Nikolakis Mitropoulos raising his flag at Salona; a scene from the early stages of the Greek War of Independence in 1821.

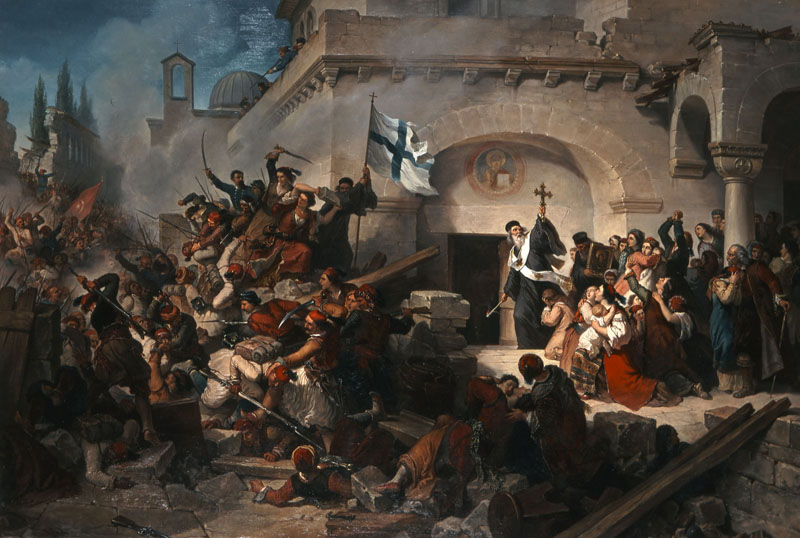
The Arcadian Holocaust, by Giuseppe Lorenzo Gatteri; scene from the Great Cretan Revolution.

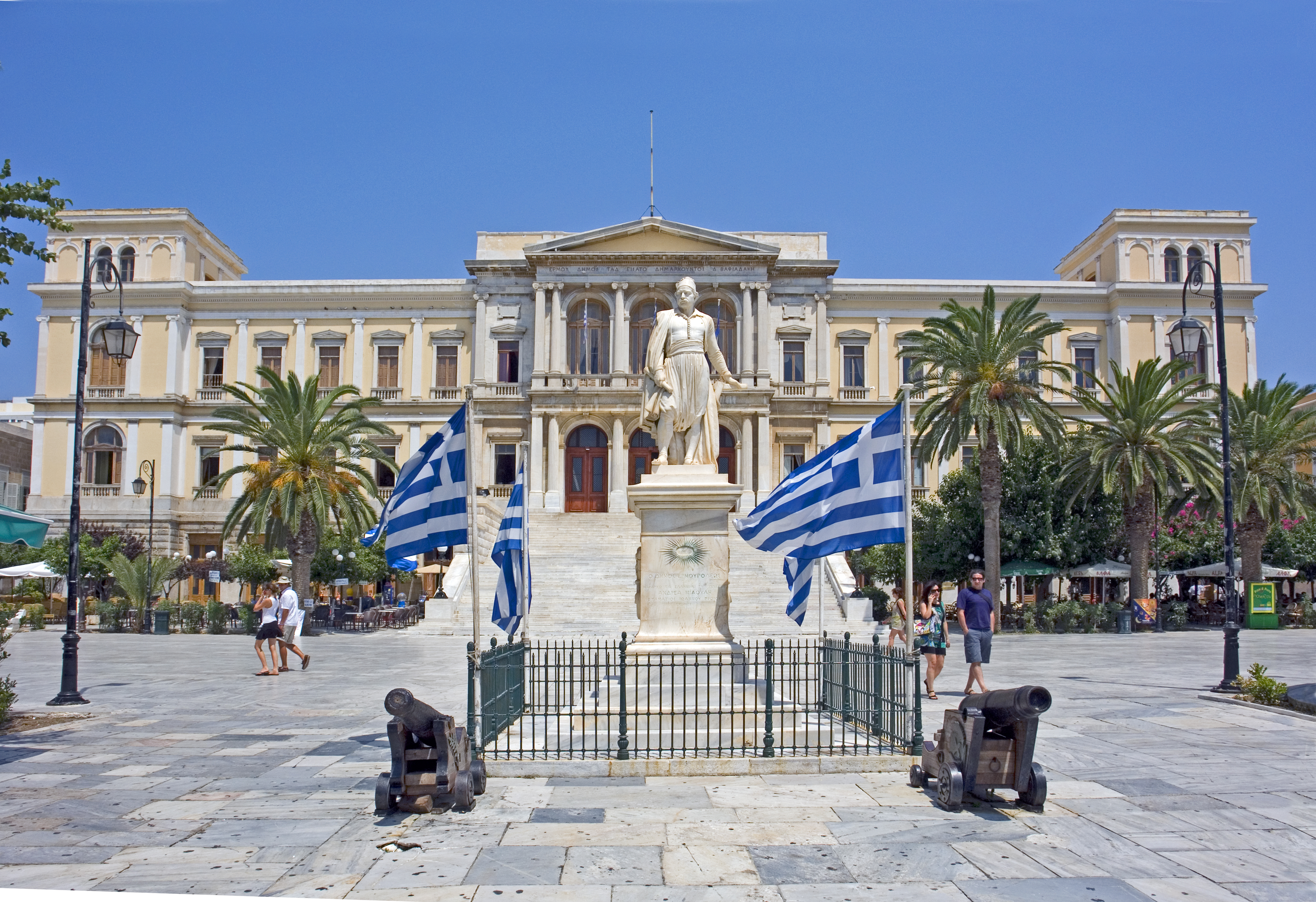
Ermoupolis City Hall, designed by Ernst Ziller, with the statue of Andreas Miaoulis at Miaoulis Square (work of Georgios Bonanos).

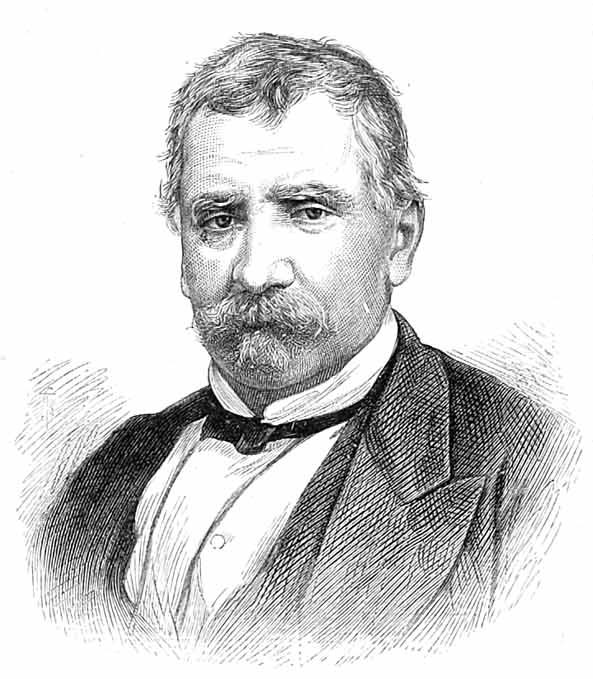
Alexandros Koumoundouros, founder of the Greek Nationalist Party.

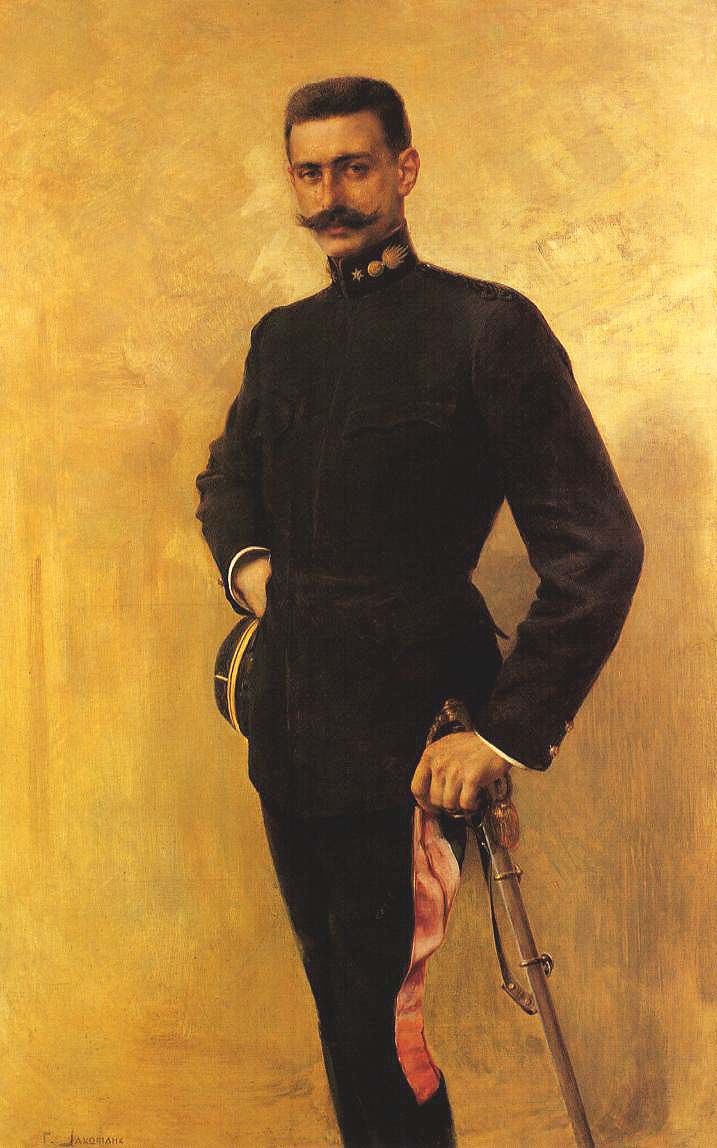
Pavlos Melas, a Greek revolutionary and artillery officer of the Hellenic Army that was killed during the Macedonian Struggle (1893–1912).

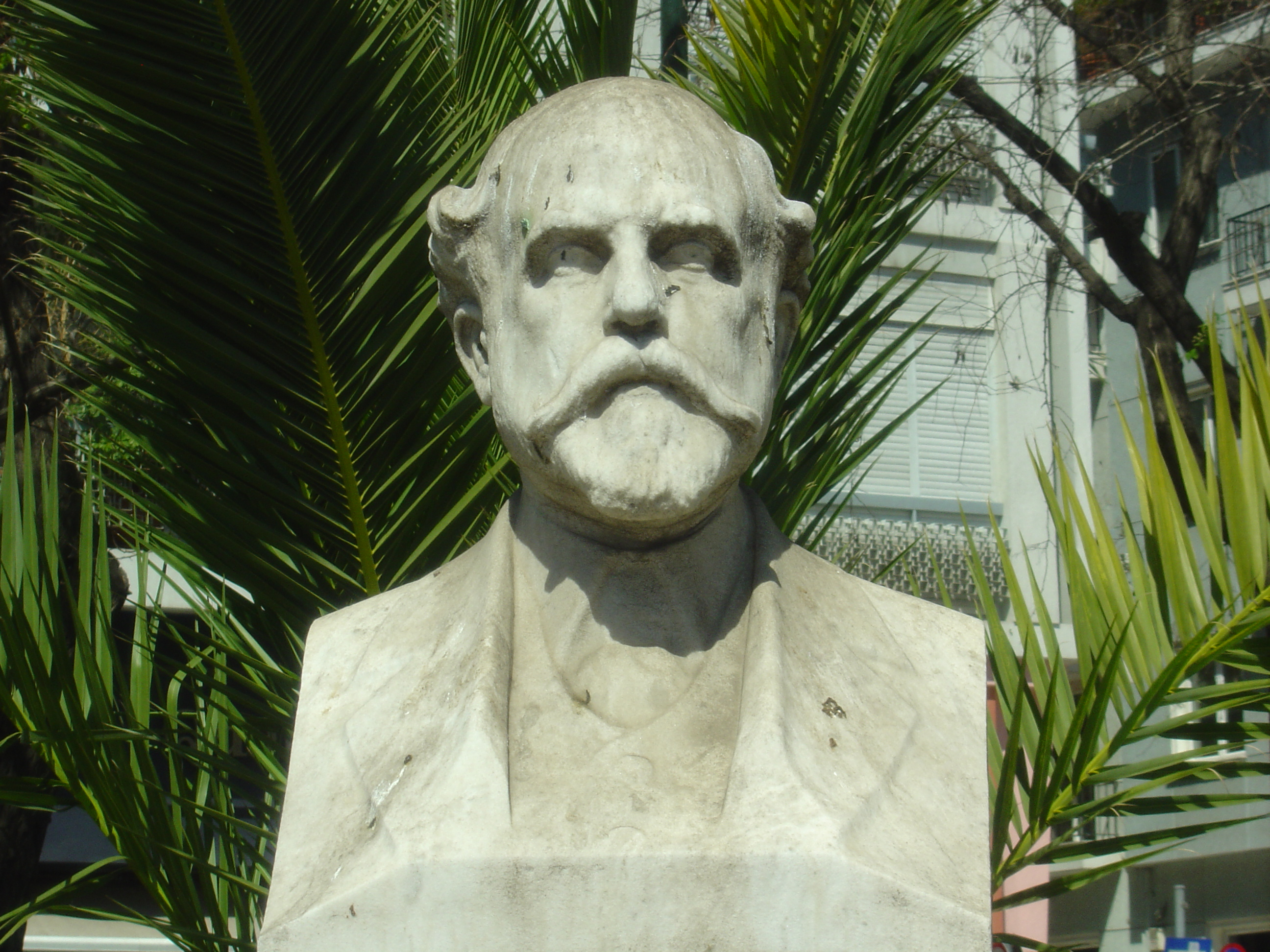
Lorentzos Mavilis, a Greek war poet that was killed during the First Balkan War (1912–1913).

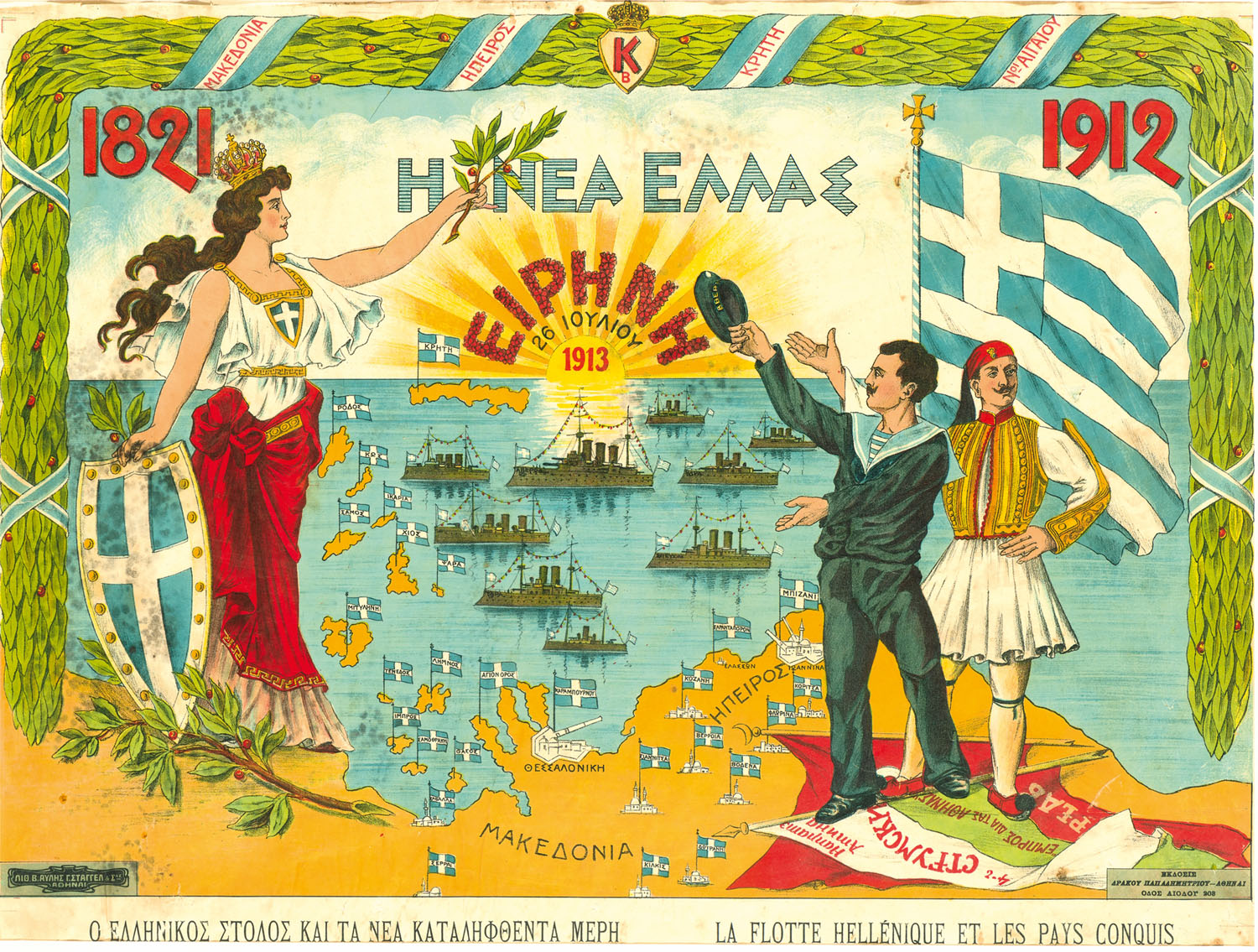
Poster celebrating the "New Greece" after the Balkan Wars.

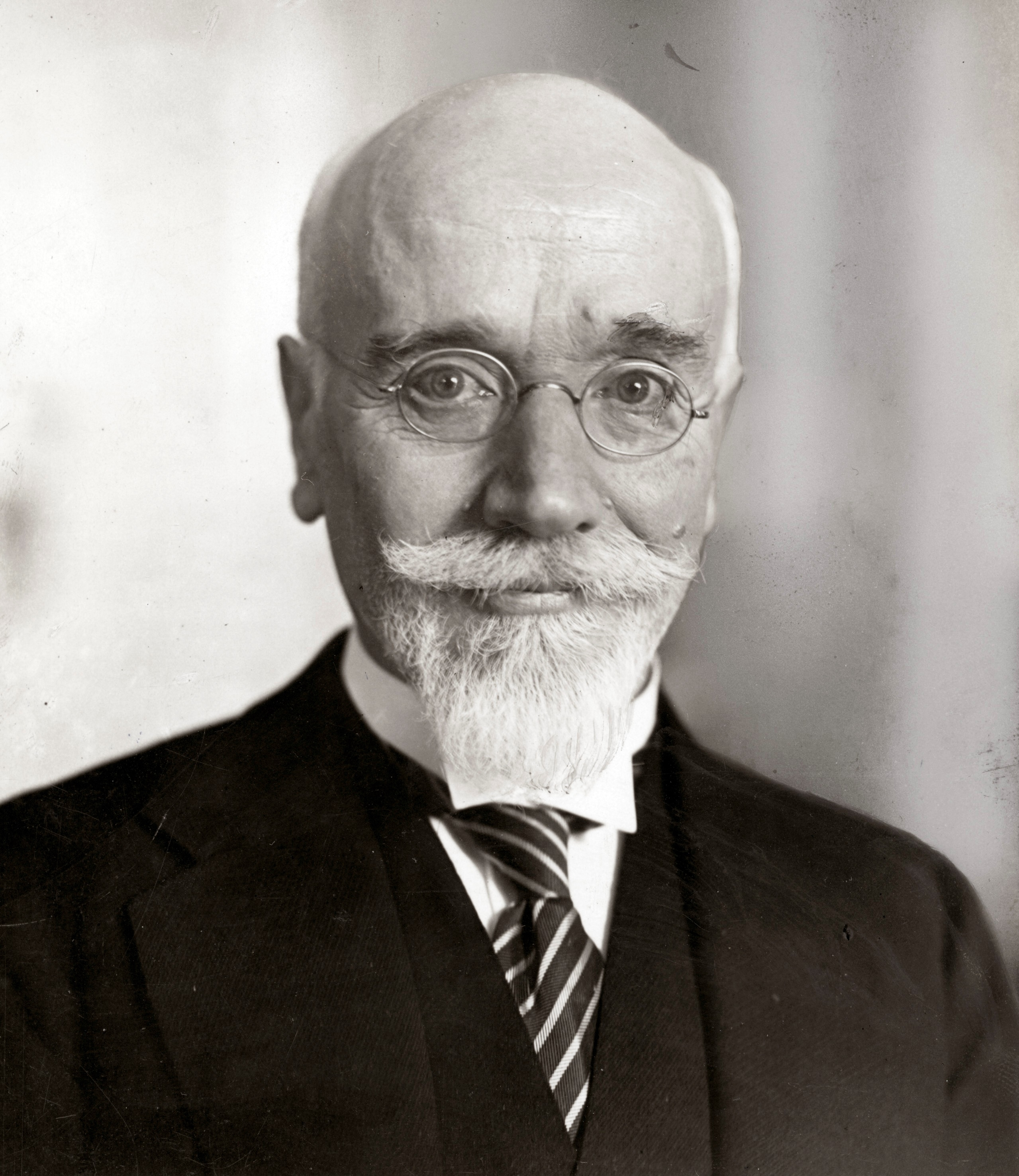
Eleftherios Venizelos, a prominent leader of the Greek national liberation movement.

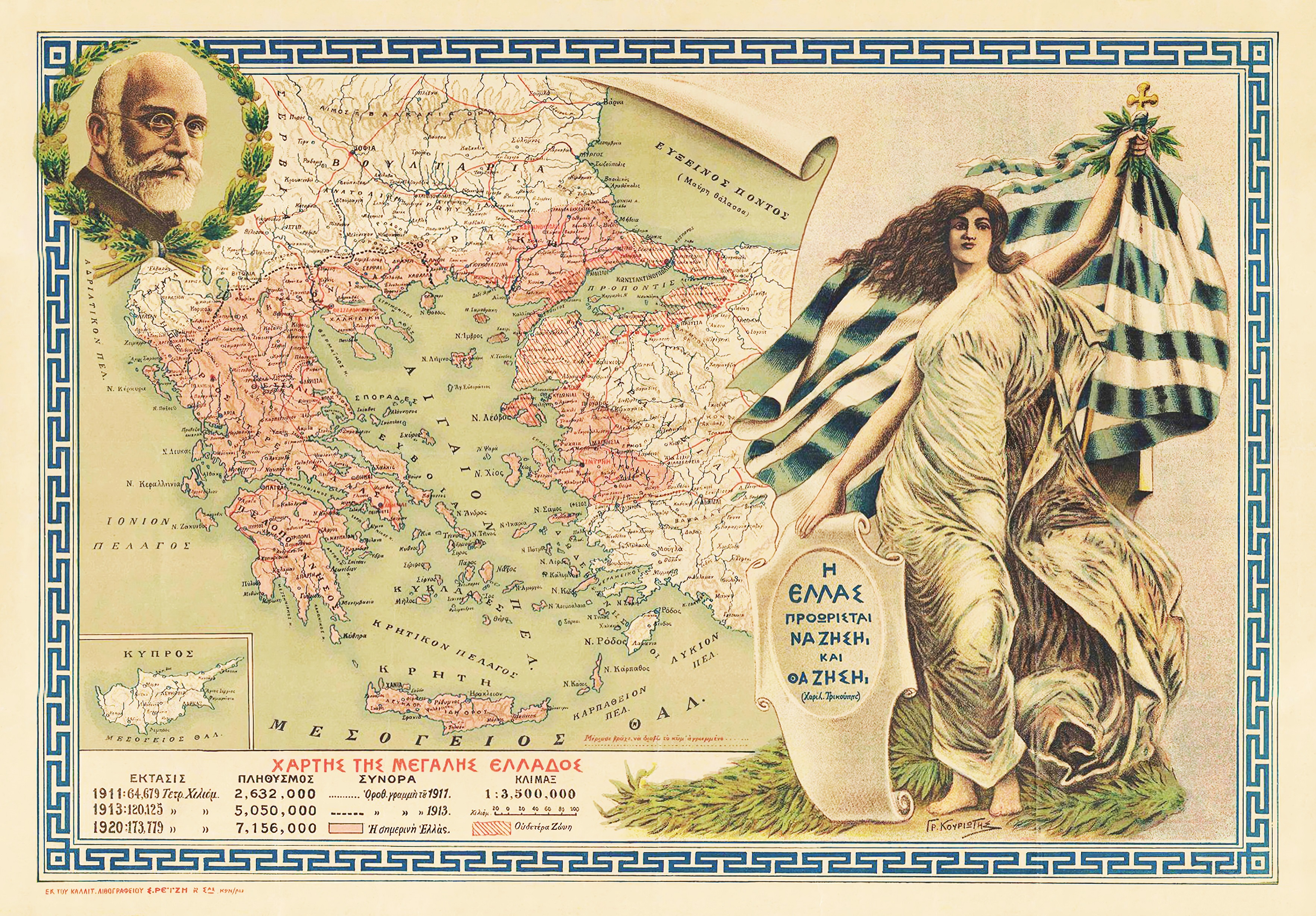
Map of "Greater Greece" after the Treaty of Sèvres, featuring Eleftherios Venizelos, when the Megali Idea seemed close to fulfillment.

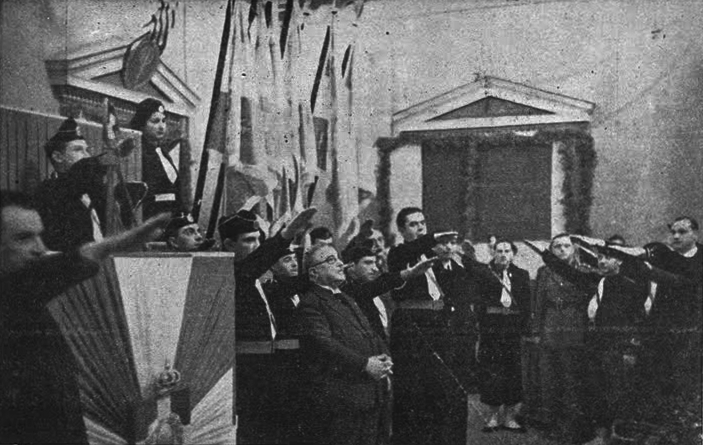
Members of the National Organisation of Youth (EON) hail in presence of Ioannis Metaxas during the 4th of August Regime.

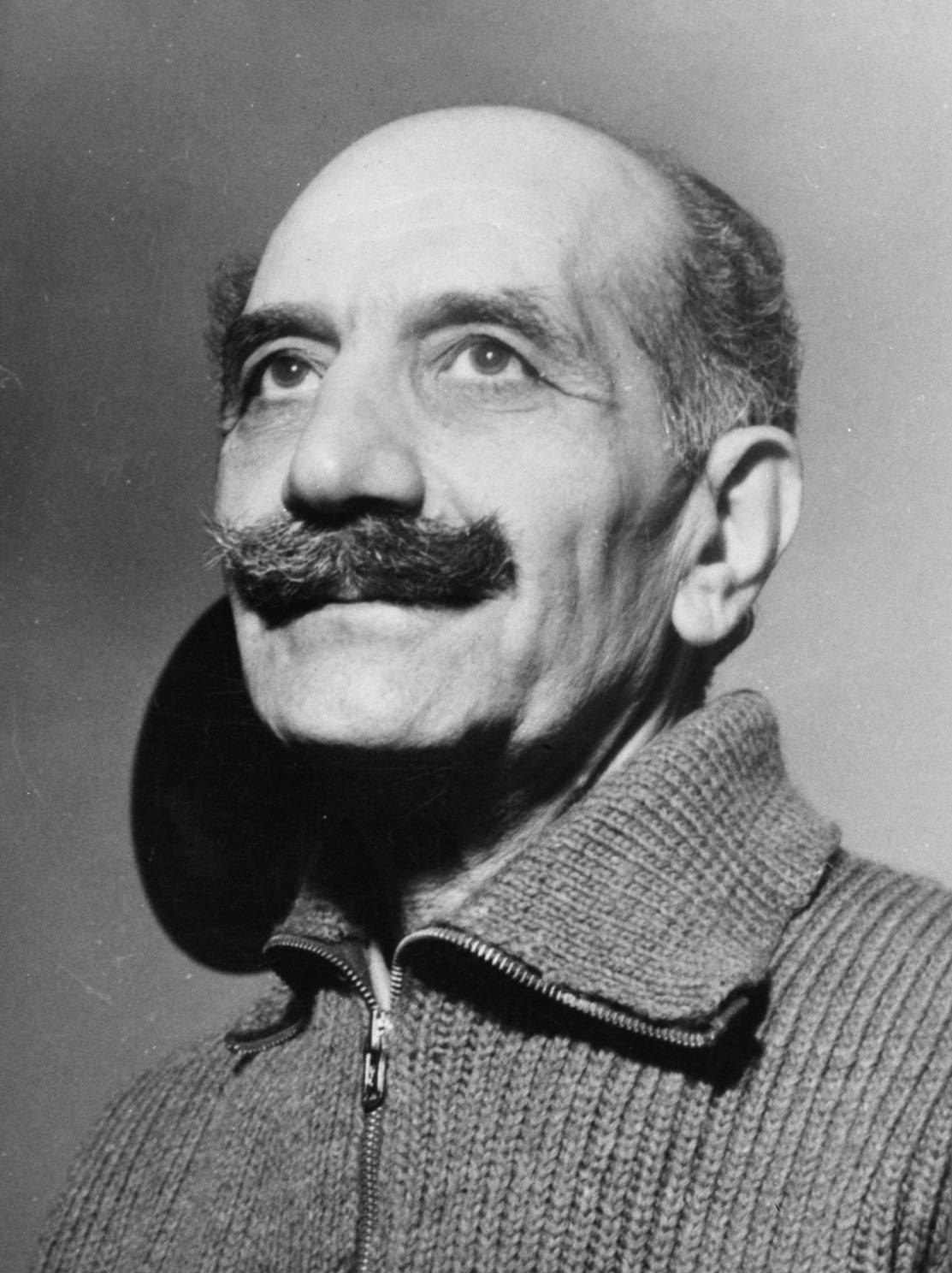
Georgios Grivas, Greek Cypriot nationalist and leader of Cypriot Enosis movement and EOKA against British colonial rule.

== Nationalist and Ultranationalist political parties ==
=== Before Metapolitefsi ===
- French Party (1825-1865)
- Russian Party (1825-1865)
- English Party (1825-1865)
- New Party (1873–1910) (parliamentary)
- Nationalist Party (1865–1913) (parliamentary)
- Liberal Party (1910–1961) (parliamentary)
- Freethinkers' Party (1922–1936) (parliamentary)
- National Union of Greece (1927–1944)
- Greek National Socialist Party (1932–1943)
- Hellenic Socialist Patriotic Organisation (1941–1942)
- Politically Independent Alignment (1949–1951) (parliamentary)
- Greek Rally (1951–1955) (parliamentary)

=== After Metapolitefsi ===
- Political Spring (1993–2004) (parliamentary)
- Popular Orthodox Rally (2000–) (parliamentary)
- Independent Greeks (2012–2019) (parliamentary)
- Greek Solution (2016–) (parliamentary)
- Democratic Patriotic Movement (2019–) (parliamentary)
- Spartans (Greek political party) (parliamentary)
- Golden Dawn (1985–2020) (parliamentary)
- Voice of Reason (2023–) (European parliamentary)
- National Party – Greeks
- 4th of August Party (1965–1977)
- National Democratic Union (1974–1977)
- National Alignment (1977–1981)
- United Nationalist Movement (1979–1991)
- Party of Hellenism (1981–2004)
- Hellenic Front (1994–2005)
- Panhellenic Macedonian Front
- Front Line (1999–2000)
- National Political Union (1984–1996)
- Greek Unity (1989–2009)
- National Hope (2010–)
- United Popular Front (2011–)
- National Unity Association (2011–)
- National Front (2012–)
- Patriotic Alliance (2004–2007)
- Society – Political Party of the Successors of Kapodistrias (2008–2020)
- Popular Greek Patriotic Union (2015–2022)
- New Right (2016–2023)
- National Unity (2016)
- Patriotic Radical Union (2018–2022)
- National Popular Consciousness (2019–2023)

== See also ==
- Ancient Greek law
  - Draconian constitution
  - Solonian constitution
- Athenian democracy
- Background of the Greek War of Independence
  - Cretan Revolts
  - Pashalik of Yanina
  - Philhellenism
  - Rise of nationalism in the Ottoman Empire#Greeks
  - Rumelia
- Greek Resistance
  - National Liberation Front-Greek People's Liberation Army (EAM-ELAS)
  - National Republican Greek League (EDES)
  - National and Social Liberation (EKKA)
  - National Organization of Crete (EOK)
  - Panhellenic Liberation Organization (PAO)
- List of Ancient Greeks
- Spartan hegemony
- Treaty of Constantinople (1832)
- Treaty of Constantinople (1881)
