= New Liberals =

New Liberals may refer to:

- TNL (political party), formerly known as The New Liberals, a current Australian political party, active 2019-present
- New Liberals (Germany), a current German political association and former political party, active 2014-present
- New Liberal Club, a former Japanese political party, active 1976-1986
- New Liberal Movement, a former South Australian political party, active 1976-1977
- Party of New Liberals, a former Greek political party, active 1977-1978

== See also ==
- New Liberalism
- New Liberal Party
