= New Liberal Party =

New Liberal Party may refer to:

- New Liberal Party (Israel), a defunct political party in Israel
- New Liberal Party (2019 party), an active political party in Israel
- New Liberal Party (New Zealand)
- New Liberal Party (North Macedonia) (est. 2009)

== See also ==
- Party of New Liberals
- New Liberals
- New Liberalism
- Neoliberal Party
