= United Nationalist Movement =

United Nationalist Movement Ενιαίο Εθνικιστικό Κίνημα
- Founder: Polydoros Dakoglou
- Founded: 1979
- Dissolved: 1991
- Split from: National Alignment
- Ideology: Greek nationalism
- Political position: Far-right

United Nationalist Movement (Greek: Ενιαίο Εθνικιστικό Κίνημα, ΕΝΕΚ) was a Greek far-right political party. The party was founded in 1979 by former members of the youth of National Alignment. It participated in the European election, 1984 and gained 0.09%. In the European election, 1989, the party gained 0.23% of the vote. A few years later, the party dissolved.
