= Arta–Volos line =

Greek-Ottoman border from 1832 to 1881

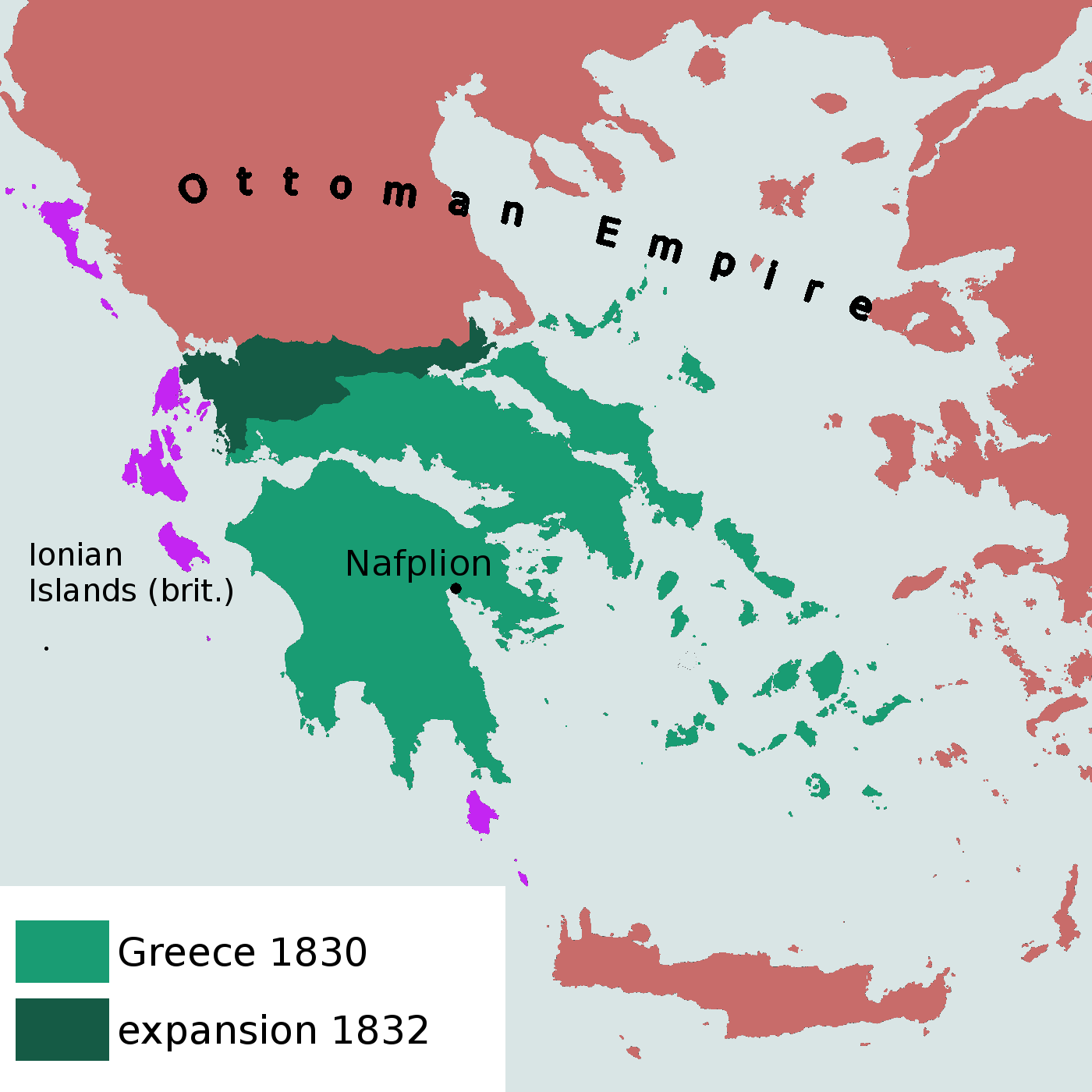
Line in dark green.

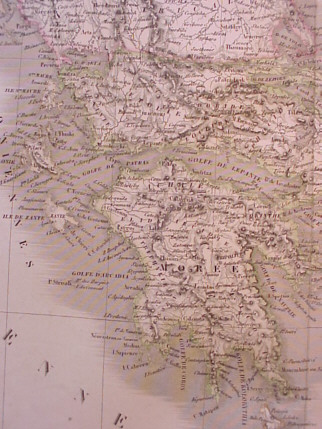
The demarcated Greek border.

The Arta–Volos line (Greek: Γραμμή Άρτας - Βόλου) or Ambracian–Pagasetic line (Greek: Γραμμή Αμβρακικού - Παγασητικού) was the land border of the Kingdom of Greece and the Ottoman Empire between 1832 and the Annexation of Thessaly in 1881. It was named after the two principal cities in proximity of the border on the Ottoman side, Arta and Volos, and the Ambracian Gulf and the Pagasetic Gulf between which it extended.

The border had been proposed by the Great Powers in the London Protocol of 1829 as the northern boundary of an autonomous Greek state under Ottoman suzerainty, but when the full independence of Greece was agreed on in the London Protocol of 1830, the borders of the new state were reduced to the Aspropotamos–Spercheios line, only to be again expanded in the London Conference of 1832, which was confirmed by the Treaty of Constantinople (1832).

== See also ==
- Accession of the Ionian Islands to Greece
