= London Conference of 1832 =

International conference to establish the Kingdom of Greece

The London Conference of 1832 was an international conference convened to establish a stable government in Greece. Negotiations among the three Great Powers (Britain, France and Russia) resulted in the establishment of the Kingdom of Greece under a Bavarian prince. The decisions were ratified in the Treaty of Constantinople later that year. The treaty followed the Akkerman Convention which had previously recognized another territorial change in the Balkans, the suzerainty of the Principality of Serbia.

== Background ==
Greece had won its independence from the Ottoman Empire in the Greek War of Independence (1821–1829) with the help of Britain, France and Russia. In the London Protocol of 3 February 1830, the three powers had assigned the borders of the new state. However, when the governor of Greece, Ioannis Kapodistrias was assassinated in 1831 in Nafplion, the Greek peninsula plunged into confusion. The Great powers sought a formal end of the war and a recognized government in Greece.

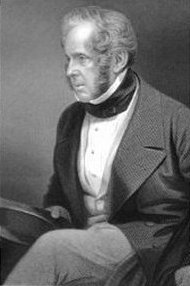
As Foreign Secretary, Viscount Palmerston was deeply interested in Greece

== Conference of London ==
On 7 May 1832, British Foreign Secretary Palmerston convened with French and Russian diplomats, and, without consultation of the Greeks, decided that Greece should be a monarchy. The convention offered the throne to the Bavarian Prince, Otto. They also established the line of succession which would pass the crown to Otto's descendants, or his younger brothers should he have no issue. It was also decided that in no case would the crowns of Greece and Bavaria be joined in a personal union. As co-guarantors of the monarchy, the Great powers also empowered their ambassadors in Constantinople, the Ottoman capital, to secure the end of the Greek War of Independence.

Under the Treaty of London signed on 7 May 1832 between Bavaria and the protecting Powers, and dealing with how the Regency was to be managed until Otto reached his majority (while also concluding the second Greek loan, for a sum of £2,400,000 sterling), Greece was defined as an independent kingdom, with the Arta–Volos line as its northern frontier.

The factors that shaped the treaty included the refusal of Leopold of Saxe-Coburg-Gotha to assume the Greek throne. He was not at all satisfied with the Aspropotamos–Spercheios line, which replaced the more favorable Arta–Volos line considered by the Great Powers earlier. The withdrawal of Leopold I as a candidate for the throne of Greece and the July Revolution in France delayed the final settlement of the frontiers of the new kingdom until a new government was formed in London. Lord Palmerston, who took over as British foreign secretary, agreed to the Arta–Volos line. However, the secret note on Crete, which the Bavarian plenipotentiary communicated to the Courts of Britain, France, and Russia, bore no fruit.

On 21 July 1832 British ambassador Sir Stratford Canning and the other representatives concluded the Treaty of Constantinople (signed on 21 July 1832), which set the boundaries of the new Kingdom of Greece along the Arta–Volos line.

The borders of the Kingdom were reiterated in the Protocol of London signed on 30 August 1832 by the Great Powers, which ratified the terms of the Constantinople Treaty in connection with the border between Greece and the Ottoman Empire and marked the end of the Greek War of Independence creating modern Greece as an independent state free of the Ottoman Empire. The Ottoman Empire was indemnified in the sum of 40,000,000 piastres for the loss of the territory.

== See also ==
- London Protocol (1830)
- Treaty of Constantinople (1832)
- List of treaties
