= 1977 Greek parliamentary election =

- 20 November 1977

All 300 seats in the Hellenic Parliament 151 seats needed for a majority
- Registered: 6,403,738
- Turnout: 81.11% (▲1.58pp)
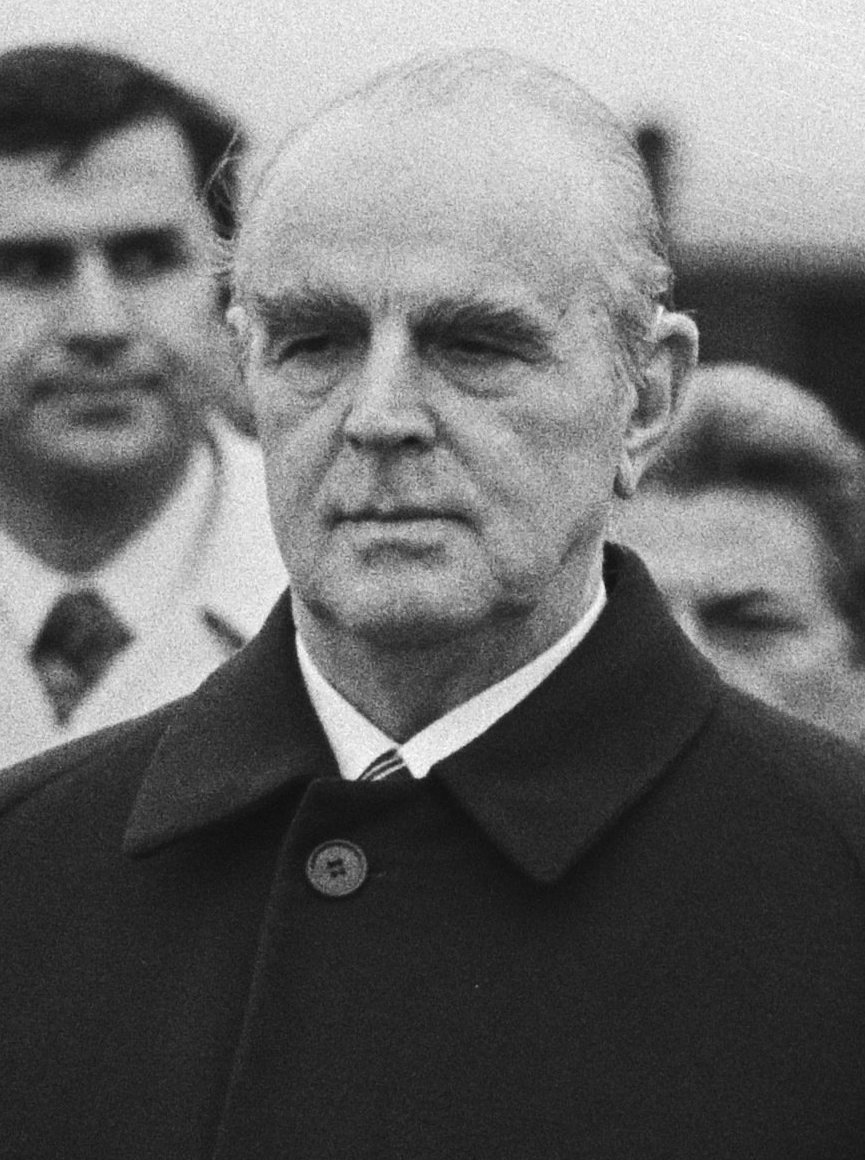

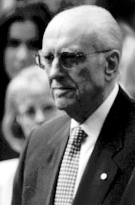

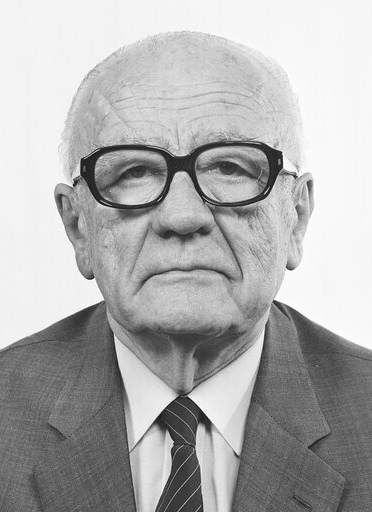

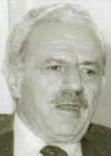

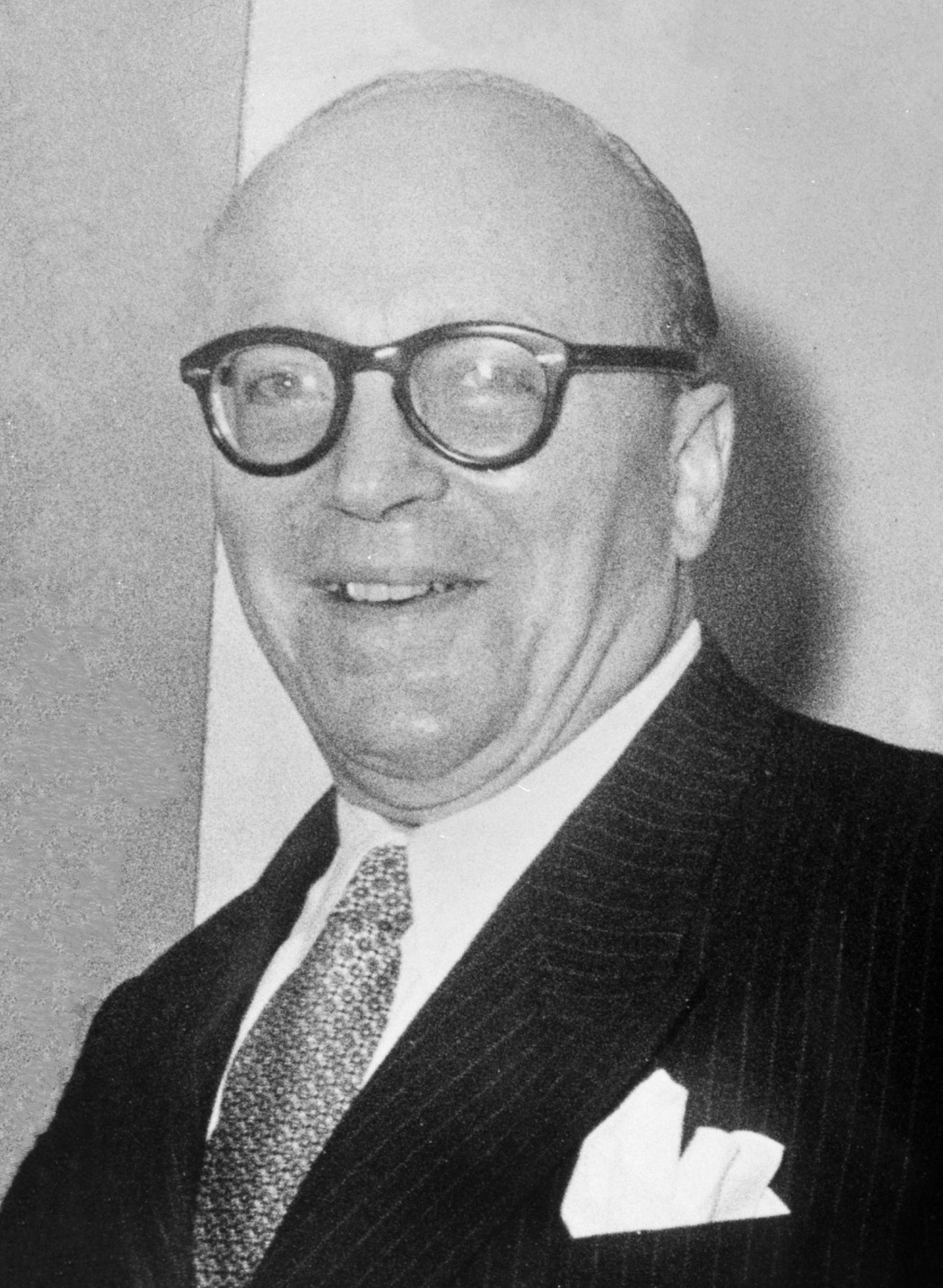

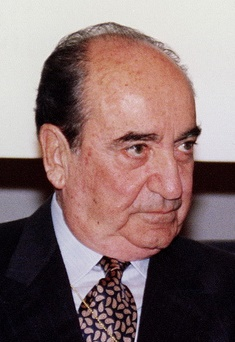
	First party	Second party	Third party
Leader	Konstantinos Karamanlis	Andreas Papandreou	Georgios Mavros
Party	ND	PASOK	EDIK
Last election	54.37%, 220 seats	13.58%, 12 seats	20.42%, 60 seats
Seats won	171	93	16
Seat change	▼49	▲81	▼44
Popular vote	2,146,365	1,300,025	612,782
Percentage	41.84%	25.34%	11.95%
Swing	▼12.53 pp	▲11.76 pp	▼8.47 pp
	Fourth party	Fifth party	Sixth party
Leader	Charilaos Florakis	Stefanos Stefanopoulos	Ilias Iliou
Party	KKE	EP	SPAD
Last election	9.47%, 8 seats	–
Seats won	11	5	2
Seat change	▲3	New
Popular vote	480,272	349,988	139,356
Percentage	9.36%	6.82%	2.72%
Swing	▼0.11 pp	New
	Seventh party
Leader	Konstantinos Mitsotakis
Party	KNF
Last election	–
Seats won	2
Seat change	New
Popular vote	55,494
Percentage	1.08%
Swing	New
Prime Minister before election
Konstantinos Karamanlis
ND
Prime Minister after election
Konstantinos Karamanlis
ND

Parliamentary elections were held in Greece on 20 November 1977. After Prime Minister Konstantinos Karamanlis called for early elections, his New Democracy party lost a large number of seats, yet still retain an absolute majority in the Parliament. The big surprise was the success of PASOK, whose socialistic rhetoric remained radical. Because of PASOK's success, the Centrists (Union of the Democratic Centre, EDIK, former Center Union - New Forces) led again by Georgios Mavros) lost half of their power. As a result, Andreas Papandreou, PASOK's leader, became a prominent figure in Greek politics. The Communists (Communist Party of Greece) and the Nationalists (National Alignment) managed to amplify their support.

Future Prime Minister of Greece, Antonis Samaras first won a seat in parliament at this election.

== Results ==
Party	Votes	%	Seats	+/–
New Democracy	2,146,365	41.84	171	−49
Panhellenic Socialist Movement	1,300,025	25.34	93	+81
Union of the Democratic Centre	612,786	11.95	16	+16
Communist Party of Greece	480,272	9.36	11	–
National Alignment	349,988	6.82	5	New
Progress and Left Forces Alliance	139,356	2.72	2	–
Party of New Liberals	55,494	1.08	2	New
Revolutionary Communist Movement	11,895	0.23	0	0
Popular Democratic Unity	8,839	0.17	0	New
International Workers' Union – Trotskyists	1,032	0.02	0	New
Hellenic Christian-Social Union	777	0.02	0	New
Communist Organisation "Fighter"	321	0.01	0	New
Labour-Agricultural Party of Greece	170	0.00	0	New
Farmer Smoke-Producers Party	84	0.00	0	New
Olympic Democracy	19	0.00	0	New
Independents	22,348	0.44	0	New
Total	5,129,771	100.00	300	0
Valid votes	5,129,771	98.77		
Invalid/blank votes	64,120	1.23		
Total votes	5,193,891	100.00		
Registered voters/turnout	6,403,738	81.11		
Source: Nohlen & Stöver

=== By constituency ===
Constituency	ND		PASOK		EDIK (Note: Compared to EK-ND and DEK)		KKE		EP (Note: Compared to EDE)		Alliance (Note: Compared to EA)	
Constituency	%	±	%	±	%	±	%	±	%	±	%	±
Achaea	40.00	▼12.01	37.26	▲12.45	5.67	▼8.62	8.14	New	6.46	▲5.94	2.02	▼6.11
Aetolia-Akarnania	49.24	▼10.64	26.16	▲10.33	10.18	▼5.34	7.58	New	4.81	▲3.36	1.25	▼5.77
Argolis	46.01	▼22.02	25.50	▲9.87	10.40	▼2.51	3.45	New	12.40	▲10.93	0.99	▼0.94
Arkadia	48.74	▼16.41	21.45	▲12.03	12.21	▼9.72	5.03	New	11.20	▲10.48	1.11	▼1.58
Arta	39.32	▼25.38	27.91	▲12.53	12.60	▲0.74	6.86	New	12.06	▲8.88	1.19	▼3.66
Athens A	42.83	▼11.19	22.58	▲10.90	9.18	▼10.93	11.51	New	6.65	▲5.44	6.00	▼6.73
Athens B	36.14	▼10.44	27.58	▲14.41	8.30	▼12.97	16.09	New	5.13	▲4.20	5.18	▼12.64
Attica	45.10	▼17.57	28.07	▲16.13	11.09	▼6.19	7.62	New	5.48	▲4.72	1.80	▼5.28
Boeotia	39.40	▼20.41	30.96	▲15.39	11.99	▼3.42	7.37	New	7.98	▲7.60	1.71	▼4.49
Cephalonia	39.67	▼17.87	24.05	▲16.30	9.76	▼12.42	13.06	New	11.32	New	2.12	▼10.00
Chalkidiki	52.82	▼13.67	25.31	▲13.21	10.70	▼5.76	4.16	New	4.31	▲3.82	1.67	▼2.77
Chania	16.01	▲0.75	23.44	▲5.33	20.55	▼17.36	10.67	New	0.95	▲0.09	1.98	▼7.52
Chios	47.76	▼5.43	15.67	▲4.78	27.03	▼2.25	5.40	New	2.01	▲1.38	2.14	▼3.84
Corfu	35.44	▼12.83	32.07	▲9.58	7.65	▼11.01	10.03	New	9.96	▲9.51	2.87	▼7.22
Corinthia	47.09	▼16.69	29.86	▲11.90	9.73	▼4.69	3.88	New	6.16	▲5.21	1.49	▼1.38
Cyclades	54.95	▼7.96	22.92	▲12.48	12.61	▼11.20	3.45	New	3.04	▲2.44	2.38	▲0.37
Dodecanese	41.32	▼4.03	27.71	▲6.70	25.06	▼5.73	2.72	New	2.05	▲1.61	1.15	▼1.24
Drama	39.66	▼18.91	27.28	▲9.40	7.25	▼8.42	3.60	New	10.23	▲9.21	1.51	▼3.00
Elis	35.24	▼17.99	31.00	▲16.22	18.11	▼9.70	3.70	New	10.61	▲10.10	0.95	▼1.65
Euboea	42.72	▼15.90	27.68	▲13.49	13.08	▼8.83	5.28	New	5.64	▲5.13	1.05	▼3.52
Evros	54.73	▼9.24	21.76	▲10.25	13.01	▼6.05	3.70	New	4.34	▲3.07	1.70	▼2.45
Evrytania	46.43	▼17.85	28.44	▲15.30	13.67	▼7.07	3.05	New	6.75	New	0.55	▼1.29
Florina	47.03	▼23.60	15.62	▲9.65	19.17	▲0.66	4.80	New	8.07	▲7.25	0.93	▼3.11
Grevena	32.44	▼26.87	18.09	▲4.62	26.98	▲5.58	8.05	New	10.32	▲9.91	1.02	▼4.37
Heraklion	24.90	▼1.35	35.36	▲7.56	25.09	▼13.65	7.23	New	0.72	▲0.52	2.18	▼4.79
Imathia	43.34	▼11.58	30.62	▲14.99	10.94	▼9.70	8.45	New	4.16	▲3.72	2.03	▼6.32
Ioannina	46.26	▼15.76	24.78	▲15.15	8.57	▼11.37	8.11	New	7.57	▲6.93	2.51	▼5.23
Karditsa	36.52	▼16.03	26.56	▲13.36	10.18	▼8.81	10.96	New	14.29	▲13.49	1.01	▼7.58
Kastoria	44.21	▼19.18	19.49	▲14.83	9.97	▼12.10	2.82	New	13.49	▲12.31	1.02	▼0.62
Kavala	50.50	▼6.49	23.30	▲11.76	9.37	▼8.60	7.44	New	3.95	▲3.50	3.83	▼7.80
Kilkis	42.98	▼14.30	23.61	▲11.52	9.14	▼6.48	10.20	New	11.35	▲10.01	1.67	▼8.79
Kozani	49.82	▼12.50	23.70	▲11.55	13.58	▼5.42	5.60	New	5.38	▲4.87	1.77	▼3.75
Laconia	55.00	▼21.04	16.23	▲9.17	7.03	▼5.89	4.17	New	16.24	▲15.32	0.88	▼2.16
Larissa	36.90	▼16.76	22.31	▲8.94	11.59	▼8.76	15.06	New	10.31	▲9.61	2.31	▼9.57
Lasithi	29.61	▼0.64	26.18	▲5.78	30.97	▼15.02	4.19	New	0.45	▲0.16	0.67	▼1.46
Lefkada	31.89	▼15.07	16.58	▲9.90	18.71	▲0.49	18.05	New	8.17	▲7.33	4.52	▼22.62
Lesbos	42.77	▼0.11	20.79	▲5.65	7.96	▼8.81	24.37	New	1.14	▲0.49	2.20	▼22.34
Magnesia	42.42	▼9.03	19.54	▲11.05	14.16	▼11.06	14.52	New	5.39	New	3.32	▼11.50
Messenia	44.43	▼19.13	23.37	▲9.83	10.94	▼6.36	6.08	New	14.05	▲11.91	0.86	▼3.58
Pella	44.21	▼16.36	31.18	▲14.18	10.98	▼5.28	4.56	New	7.35	▲6.08	1.36	▼3.42
Phocis	54.88	▼11.55	23.96	▲15.47	3.88	▼14.73	4.90	New	10.59	▲7.93	1.02	▼2.77
Phthiotis	43.97	▼21.57	22.68	▲14.92	14.16	▼6.47	5.74	New	11.01	▲9.53	1.11	▼3.42
Pieria	44.04	▼18.98	23.81	▲12.08	15.05	▼2.29	6.56	New	8.29	▲7.39	1.90	▼5.08
Piraeus A	43.93	▼10.36	23.87	▲10.97	10.97	▼8.55	11.04	New	4.89	▲3.90	4.20	▼8.06
Piraeus B	32.41	▼7.23	26.47	▲14.09	11.99	▼12.11	19.34	New	2.99	▲2.27	5.18	▼17.96
Preveza	44.21	▼14.76	34.37	▲17.25	3.89	▼12.49	7.45	New	8.87	▲6.37	1.21	▼3.80
Rethymno	29.49	▼5.70	24.28	▲3.76	13.93	▼4.71	4.57	New	0.51	▲0.23	0.86	▼2.22
Rhodope	35.73	▼8.97	16.68	▲9.07	17.00	▼22.34	2.49	New	27.31	▲20.60	0.78	▼0.84
Samos	43.39	▼7.83	10.88	▲3.67	21.54	▼2.97	17.58	New	2.94	▲2.28	3.07	▼13.30
Serres	52.55	▼14.22	23.10	▲10.91	9.67	▼3.63	6.90	New	5.59	▲5.25	1.82	▼5.55
Thesprotia	34.10	▼27.56	30.55	▲16.35	24.74	▲3.07	4.55	New	5.32	▲5.03	0.75	▼1.40
Thessaloniki A	45.80	▼8.70	22.12	▲11.20	9.02	▼8.30	11.98	New	4.18	▲3.14	5.51	▼10.36
Thessaloniki B	46.19	▼10.75	27.55	▲12.62	7.45	▼7.92	10.01	New	5.32	▲4.52	2.03	▼9.80
Trikala	37.18	▼16.64	22.34	▲11.16	19.46	▼1.74	12.10	New	7.87	▲7.25	1.13	▼8.49
Xanthi	43.86	▼8.71	22.45	▲14.22	23.99	▲0.35	2.07	New	5.40	▼8.18	1.03	▼0.92
Zakynthos	36.33	▼16.81	20.39	▲15.54	7.38	▼25.67	15.79	New	15.25	▲14.18	2.00	▼5.87

=== Seat allocation with the current system ===
The seat allocation for the 1977 election was done using the 1974-1985 system, which was notorious for greatly favouring only parties that had received more than 17% of the public vote. As a result, ND and PASOK overperformed, grabbing seats from smaller parties (EDIK, KKE and EP). Also, there was no threshold for entering the parliament. As a result, SPAD and KNF managed to gain seats, something that would have been impossible with the current system. The seat allocation by region as it would have been with the current system is presented below:

Region	ND		PASOK		EDIK		KKE		EP		SPAD		KNF	
Region	S	±	S	±	S	±	S	±	S	±	S	±	S	±
Attica	33	▲1	17	▼6	6	0	12	▲5	4	▲2	–	▼2	–	0
Central Greece	12	▼2	4	▼1	2	▲2	–	0	1	▲1	–	0	–	0
Central Macedonia	26	▼3	10	▼4	3	▲2	3	▲2	3	▲3	–	0	–	0
Crete	6	▲2	5	▼2	5	▲1	1	▲1	–	0	–	0	–	▼2
Eastern Macedonia and Thrace	12	0	4	▼2	1	▲1	–	0	2	▲1	–	0	–	0
Epirus	7	▲1	4	▼2	1	▲1	–	0	–	0	–	0	–	0
Ionian Islands	4	▼2	2	▲1	–	0	1	▲1	–	0	–	0	–	0
North Aegean	5	▼1	–	▼1	2	▲2	1	0	–	0	–	0	–	0
Peloponnese	15	▼1	4	▼2	1	▲1	–	0	3	▲2	–	0	–	0
South Aegean	6	▲1	1	▼1	1	0	–	0	–	0	–	0	–	0
Thessaly	12	▼2	4	▼2	3	▲1	4	▲2	2	▲1	–	0	–	0
Western Greece	11	▼2	7	▼2	2	0	2	▲2	2	▲2	–	0	–	0
Western Macedonia	6	▼1	1	▼1	2	▲2	–	0	–	0	–	0	–	0
Greece	5	▼2	3	▼2	2	▲2	1	▲1	1	▲1	–	0	–	0
Total	160	▼11	66	▼27	31	▲15	25	▲14	18	▲13	–	▼2	–	▼2

== Aftermath ==
In 1979 Greece became European Community's 10th member, despite the opposition of PASOK and the Communists. In October 1980 Greece rejoined NATO military structure. In 1980, Konstantinos Karamanlis succeeded Konstantinos Tsatsos as President of the Republic. George Rallis became Prime Minister and new leader of ND.
