= Background of the Greek War of Independence =

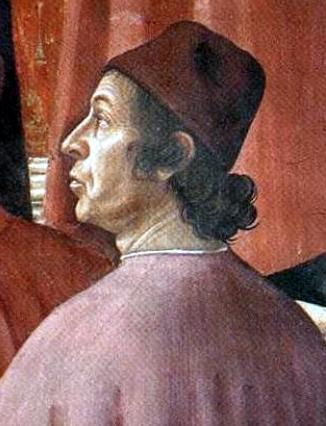
Demetrius Chalcondyles (1424 – 1511) was an Athenian born Greek scholar and Humanist who in 1463 delivered an exhortation for crusade and the recovery and liberation of Greece from the invading Ottoman Turks.

The Fall of Constantinople in 1453 and the subsequent fall of the successor states of the Eastern Roman Empire marked the end of Byzantine sovereignty. Since then, the Ottoman Empire ruled the Balkans and Anatolia, although there were some exceptions: the Ionian Islands were under Venetian rule, and Ottoman authority was challenged in mountainous areas, such as Agrafa, Sfakia, Souli, Himara and the Mani Peninsula. Orthodox Christians were granted some political rights under Ottoman rule, but they were considered inferior subjects. The majority of Greeks were called rayas by the Turks, a name that referred to the large mass of subjects in the Ottoman ruling class. Meanwhile, Greek intellectuals and humanists who had migrated west before or during the Ottoman invasions began to compose orations and treatises calling for the liberation of their homeland. In 1463, Demetrius Chalcondyles called on Venice and “all of the Latins” to aid the Greeks against the Ottomans, he composed orations and treatises calling for the liberation of Greece from what he called “the abominable, monstrous, and impious barbarian Turks.” In the 17th century, Greek scholar Leonardos Philaras spent much of his career in persuading Western European intellectuals to support Greek independence. However, Greece was to remain under Ottoman rule for several more centuries. In the 18th and 19th century, as revolutionary nationalism grew across Europe—including the Balkans (due, in large part, to the influence of the French Revolution)—the Ottoman Empire's power declined and Greek nationalism began to assert itself, with the Greek cause beginning to draw support not only from the large Greek merchant diaspora in both Western Europe and Russia but also from Western European Philhellenes. This Greek movement for independence, was not only the first movement of national character in Eastern Europe, but also the first one in a non-Christian environment, like the Ottoman Empire.

== Greeks under Ottoman rule ==
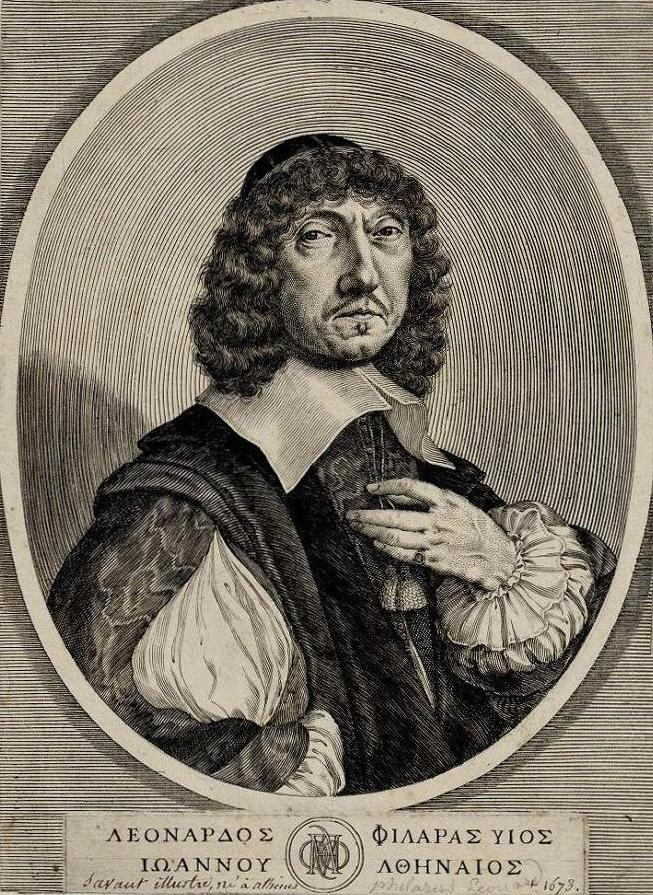
Leonardos Philaras (c. 1595 – 1673) was a Greek scholar and early supporter of Greek liberation, he spent much of his career in persuading Western European intellectuals to support Greek Independence.

The Greek Revolution was not an isolated event; numerous failed attempts at regaining independence took place throughout the history of the Ottoman era. In 1603, there was an attempt in Morea to restore the Byzantine Empire. Throughout the 17th century there was great resistance to the Ottomans in the Peloponnese and elsewhere, as evidenced by revolts led by Dionysius the Philosopher in 1600 and 1611 in Epirus. The Ottoman rule of Morea was interrupted by the Morean War, as the peninsula came under Venetian rule for 30 years. Between the 1680s and the Ottoman reconquest in 1715 during the Ottoman–Venetian War, the province would remain in turmoil from then on and throughout the 17th century, as the bands of the klephts multiplied. The first great uprising was the Russian-sponsored Orlov Revolt of the 1770s, which was crushed by the Ottomans after having limited success. After the crushing of the uprising, the Muslim Albanians ravaged many regions in mainland Greece. However, the Maniots continually resisted Turkish rule, enjoying virtual autonomy and defeating several Turkish incursions into their region, the most famous of which was the invasion of 1770. During the second Russo-Turkish War, the Greek community of Trieste financed a small fleet under Lambros Katsonis, which was a nuisance for the Turkish navy; during the war klephts and armatoloi rose once again.

At the same time, a number of Greeks enjoyed a privileged position in the Ottoman state as members of the Ottoman bureaucracy. Greeks controlled the affairs of the Orthodox Church through the Ecumenical Patriarchate, based in Constantinople, as the higher clergy of the Orthodox Church was mostly of Greek origin. Thus, as a result of the Ottoman millet system, the predominantly Greek hierarchy of the Patriarchate enjoyed control over the Empire's Orthodox subjects (the Rum milleti). Modern scholars assert that the Greek Orthodox Church played a pivotal role in the preservation of national identity, the development of Greek society and the resurgence of Greek nationalism. From the 18th century and onwards, members of prominent Greek families in Constantinople, known as Phanariotes (after the Phanar district of the city) gained considerable control over Turkish foreign policy and eventually over the bureaucracy as a whole.

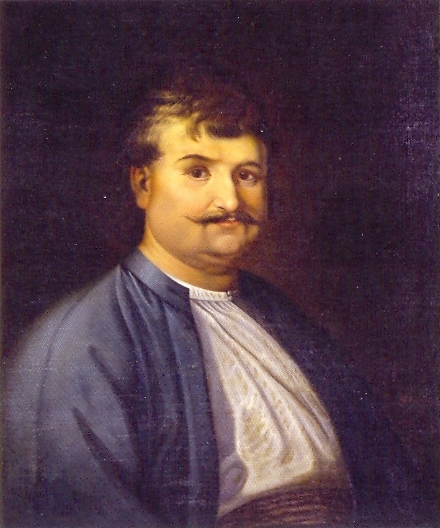
Rigas Feraios (here portrayed by Andreas Kriezis), who developed plans for a co-ordinated, pan-Balkan uprising against the Ottoman rule, is regarded as a forerunner of the Greek Revolution.

Of considerable importance during the same period was the strong maritime tradition on the islands of the Aegean, together with the emergence over the 18th century of an influential merchant class, which generated the wealth necessary to found schools, libraries and pay for young Greeks to study at the universities of Western Europe. It was there that they came into contact with the radical ideas of the European Enlightenment, the French Revolution and romantic nationalism. They also came to realize the influence of the Greek language and civilization in the thought of the educated young people of the time. Educated and influential members of the large Greek diaspora, such as Adamantios Korais and Anthimos Gazis, tried to transmit these ideas back to the Greeks, with the double aim of raising their educational level and simultaneously strengthening their national identity. This was achieved through the dissemination of books, pamphlets and other writings in Greek, in a process that has been described as the modern Greek Enlightenment (Greek: Διαφωτισμός). The rich merchants had a very important role in this, greatly funding, aside from schools and libraries, book publications. A constantly increasing number of books were being published, especially addressed to Greek audience. The books published in the last fourth of the 18th century, were seven times as many as those published in the first. In the twenty years before the revolution, some 1,300 new titles had been published.

The most influential of the writers and intellectuals who helped shape a consensus among Greeks both within and outside the Ottoman Empire was Rigas Feraios. Born in Thessaly and educated in Constantinople, Feraios wrote articles for the Greek-language newspaper Efimeris in Vienna in the 1790s. Deeply influenced by the French Revolution, he was the first who conceived and organized a comprehensive national movement aiming at the liberation of all Balkan nations—including the Turks of the region—and the creation of a "Balkan Republic". He published a series of revolutionary tracts and proposed republican Constitutions for the Greek and later also pan-Balkan Republic. Arrested by Austrian officials in Trieste in 1797, he was handed over to Ottoman officials and transported to Belgrade along with his co-conspirators. All of them were strangled to death and their bodies were dumped in the Danube, in June 1798. Feraios' death ultimately fanned the flames of Greek nationalism; his nationalist poem, the Thourios (war-song), was translated into a number of Western European and later Balkan languages and served as a rallying cry for Greeks against Ottoman rule:

Ὡς πότε παλικάρια, νὰ ζοῦμε στὰ στενά,
μονάχοι σὰ λεοντάρια, σταῖς ράχαις στὰ βουνά;
Σπηλιαῖς νὰ κατοικοῦμε, νὰ βλέπωμεν κλαδιά,
νὰ φεύγωμ᾿ ἀπ᾿ τὸν κόσμον, γιὰ τὴν πικρὴ σκλαβιά;
Νὰ χάνωμεν ἀδέλφια, πατρίδα καὶ γονεῖς,
τοὺς φίλους, τὰ παιδιά μας, κι ὅλους τοὺς συγγενεῖς;
...
Καλλιῶναι μίας ὥρας ἐλεύθερη ζωή,
παρὰ σαράντα χρόνοι, σκλαβιὰ καὶ φυλακή.

Translation:

For how long, o brave young men, shall we live in fastnesses,
Alone, like lions, on the ridges in the mountains?
Shall we dwell in caves, looking out on branches,
Fleeing from the world on account of bitter serfdom?
Abandoning brothers, sisters, parents, homeland
Friends, children, and all of our kin?
...
Better one hour of free life,
Than forty years of slavery and prison.

== Klephts and armatoloi ==
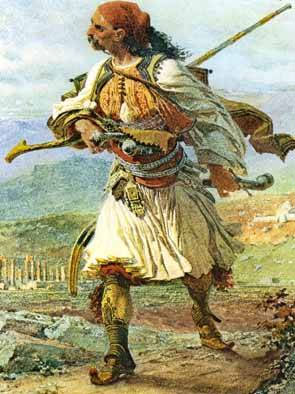
Armatolos. Water Colour by Carl Haag.

In times of militarily weak central authority, the Balkan countryside became infested by groups of bandits that struck at Muslims and Christians alike, called klephts (κλέφτες) in Greek, the equivalent of Hajduks. Defying Ottoman rule, the klephts were highly admired and held a significant place in the popular mythology. Responding to the klephts' attacks, the Ottomans recruited the ablest amongst these groups, contracting Christian militias, known as armatoloi (Greek: αρματολοί), to secure endangered areas, especially mountain passes. The area under their control was called armatolik, the oldest known being established in Agrafa during the reign of Murad II.

Boundaries between klephts and armatoloi were not clear, as the latter would often turn into klephts to extort more benefits from the authorities, and, consequently, another klepht group would be appointed to the armatolik to confront their predecessors.

Nevertheless, klephts and armatoloi formed a provincial elite, though not a social class whose members would muster under a common goal. As the armatoloi's position gradually turned into a hereditary one, some captains took care of their armatolik as their personal property. A great deal of power was placed in their hands and they integrated in the network of clientelist relationships that formed the Ottoman administration. Some managed to establish exclusive control in their armatolik, forcing the Porte to repeatedly, though unsuccessfully, try to eliminate them. By the time of the War of Independence powerful armatoloi could be traced in Rumeli, modern Thessaly, Epirus and southern Macedonia. According to Yannis Makriyannis, klephts and armatoloi—being the only available major military formation on the side of the Greeks—played such a crucial role in the Greek revolution that he referred to them as the "yeast of liberty".

== Filiki Eteria ==
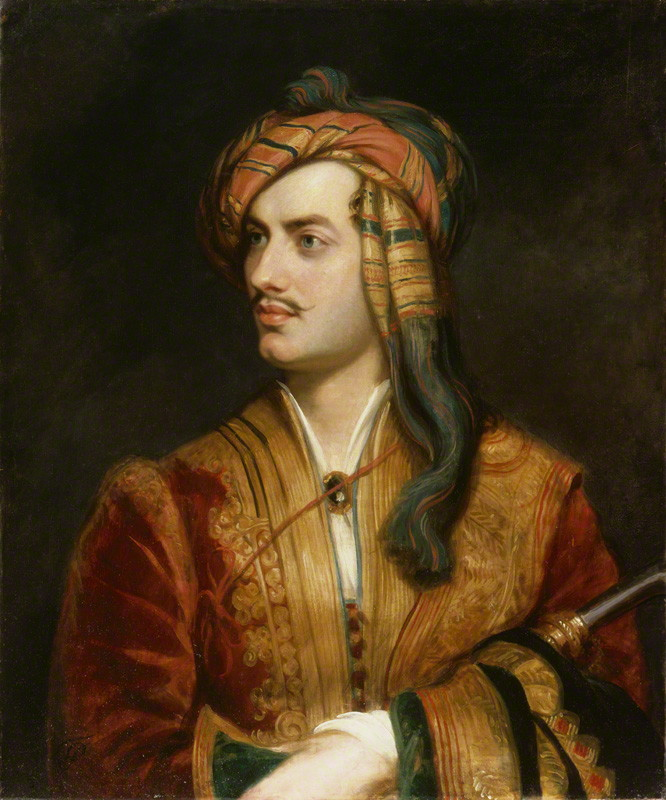
Lord Byron (here portrayed in Albanian costume by Thomas Phillips) was a prominent British philhellene who died during the Greek revolution.

Feraios' martyrdom was to inspire three young Greek merchants, Nikolaos Skoufas, Manolis Xanthos, and Athanasios Tsakalov. Influenced by the Italian Carbonari (organized in the fashion of Freemasonry), they founded in 1814 the secret Filiki Eteria ("Friendly Society") in Odessa, an important center of the Greek mercantile diaspora. With the support of wealthy Greek exile communities in Britain and the United States and with the aid of sympathizers in Western Europe, they planned the rebellion. The society's basic objective was a revival of the Byzantine Empire, with Constantinople as the capital, not the formation of a national state. In early 1820, Ioannis Kapodistrias, an official from the Ionian Islands who had become the joint foreign minister of Tsar Alexander I, was approached by the Society in order to be named leader but declined the offer; the Filikoi (members of Filiki Eteria) then turned to Alexander Ypsilantis, a Phanariote serving in the Russian army as general and adjutant to Alexander, who accepted.

The Filiki Eteria expanded rapidly and was soon able to recruit members in all areas of the Greek world and among all elements of the Greek society. In 1821, the Ottoman Empire mainly faced the war against Persia and most particularly the revolt by Ali Pasha in Epirus, which had forced the vali (governor) of the Morea, Hursid Pasha, and other local pashas to leave their provinces and campaign against the rebel force. At the same time, the Great Powers, allied in the "Concert of Europe" in opposition to revolutions in the aftermath of Napoleon I of France, were preoccupied with revolts in Italy and Spain. It was in this context that the Greeks judged the time ripe for their own revolt. The plan originally involved uprisings in three places, the Peloponnese, the Danubian Principalities and Constantinople.

== Sources ==
=== Primary sources ===
- Makriyannis, Yannis, Memoirs. See the original Greek text in Βικιθήκη.

=== Secondary sources ===
- Batalas, Achilles (2003). "Send a Thief to Catch a Thief: State-building and the Employment of Irregular Military Formations in Mid-Nineteenth-Century Greece". In Diane E. Davis; Anthony W. Pereira (eds.). Irregular Armed Forces and Their Role in Politics and State Formation. Cambridge University Press. ISBN 0-521-81277-1.
- Clogg, Richard (2002) [1992]. A Concise History of Greece (Second ed.). Cambridge, UK: Cambridge University Press. ISBN 0-521-00479-9.
- Jelavich, Barbara (1983). History of the Balkans, 18th and 19th Centuries. New York: Cambridge University Press. ISBN 0-521-27458-3.
- Kassis, Kyriakos (1979). Mani's History. Athens: Presoft.
- Kitromilides, Paschalis M. (January 1990). "Greek Irredentism in Asia Minor and Cyprus". Middle Eastern Studies. 26 (1): 3–17. doi:10.1080/00263209008700801. JSTOR 4283345.
- Koliopoulos, John S. (1987). Brigands with a Cause: Brigandage and Irredentism in Modern Greece, 1821-1912. Clarendon. ISBN 0-19-888653-5.
- Paparrigopoulos, Constantine; Karolidis, Pavlos (1925). History of the Hellenic Nation. Athens: Eleftheroudakis.
- Paroulakis, Peter H. (1984). The Greek War of Independence. Hellenic International Press. ISBN 978-0-9590894-1-7.
- Rivlin, Brancha (1988). The Holocaust in Greece. Keterpress Enterprises Jerusalem.
- Roy, Christian (2005). "Annunciation". Traditional Festivals. ABC-CLIO. ISBN 1-57607-089-1.
- St. Clair, William (1972). That Greece Might Still Be Free – The Philhellenes in the War of Independence. London: Oxford University Press. ISBN 0-19-215194-0.
- Svoronos, Nikos G. (2007) [first edition in French, 1972]. History of Modern Greece (translated in Greek by Aikaterini Asdracha). Athens: Themelio. ISBN 978-960-7293-21-3.
- Trudgill, Peter (2000). "Greece and European Turkey". In Barbour, Stephen; Carmichael, Cathie (eds.). Language and Nationalism in Europe. Vol. 3. Oxford University Press. ISBN 0-19-823671-9.
