= National Alignment =

National Alignment Εθνική Παράταξη
- Founder: Stefanos Stefanopoulos
- Founded: 1977
- Dissolved: 1981
- Merged into: New Democracy
- Ideology: Greek nationalism Royalism; Anti-communism
- Political position: Far-right

National Alignment (EP, Greek: Εθνική Παράταξις (Ε.Π.), Ethniki Parataxis) was a nationalist-conservative Greek political party that contested only the 1977 legislative election, winning 7% of the vote and five seats. It was founded by conservatives who split from Konstantinos Karamanlis and his New Democracy party, who resented Karamanlis moving towards the center and distancing himself from hard-right elements, and alleged that Karamanlis had given too many concessions to the left, in particular by legalizing the Communist Party of Greece and overseeing the imprisonment of the leaders of the 1967–1974 junta. The EP's leader was Stefanos Stefanopoulos (who had briefly been prime minister in 1965, during Apostasia), and its deputy leader was Spyros Theotokis (a former member of the National Radical Union). Although the party was not officially royalist, Theotokis was a noted royalist, giving the party somewhat of an association with the monarchist right.

The party merged into New Democracy before the 1981 election, mollified by some concessions from George Rallis, and giving as a reason its desire to avoid splitting the "anti-Marxist" front. Theotokis, by that time the EP's leader, gained a parliamentary seat in the election as a New Democracy deputy.

== Electoral results ==
Results, 1993-1999 (year links to election page)
Year	Type of Election	Votes	%	Mandates
1977	Parliament	349,988	6.82	5
