= Party of New Liberals =

Defunct political party in Greece

Party of New Liberals Κόμμα Νεοφιλελευθέρων
- Abbreviation: KNF
- Founder: Konstantinos Mitsotakis
- Founded: 6 September 1977
- Dissolved: 10 May 1978
- Merged into: New Democracy
- Ideology: Conservative liberalism Social liberalism Centrism
- Political position: Centre
- Colours: Orange

The Party of New Liberals (Greek: Κόμμα των Νεοφιλελευθέρων) was a shortly lived liberal political party in Greece.

The party was founded by Konstantinos Mitsotakis in 1977. It took part in only one election, that of 1977, where it obtained 1.08% of the vote and two seats in the Hellenic Parliament (the other seat being filled by Pavlos Vardinoyannis).

The New Liberals merged into the New Democracy party in 1978. Mitsotakis became New Democracy chairman in 1984 and led a New Democracy government from 1990 to 1993.
