= Aspropotamos–Spercheios line =

Border between Greece and the Ottoman Empire between 1830 and 1832

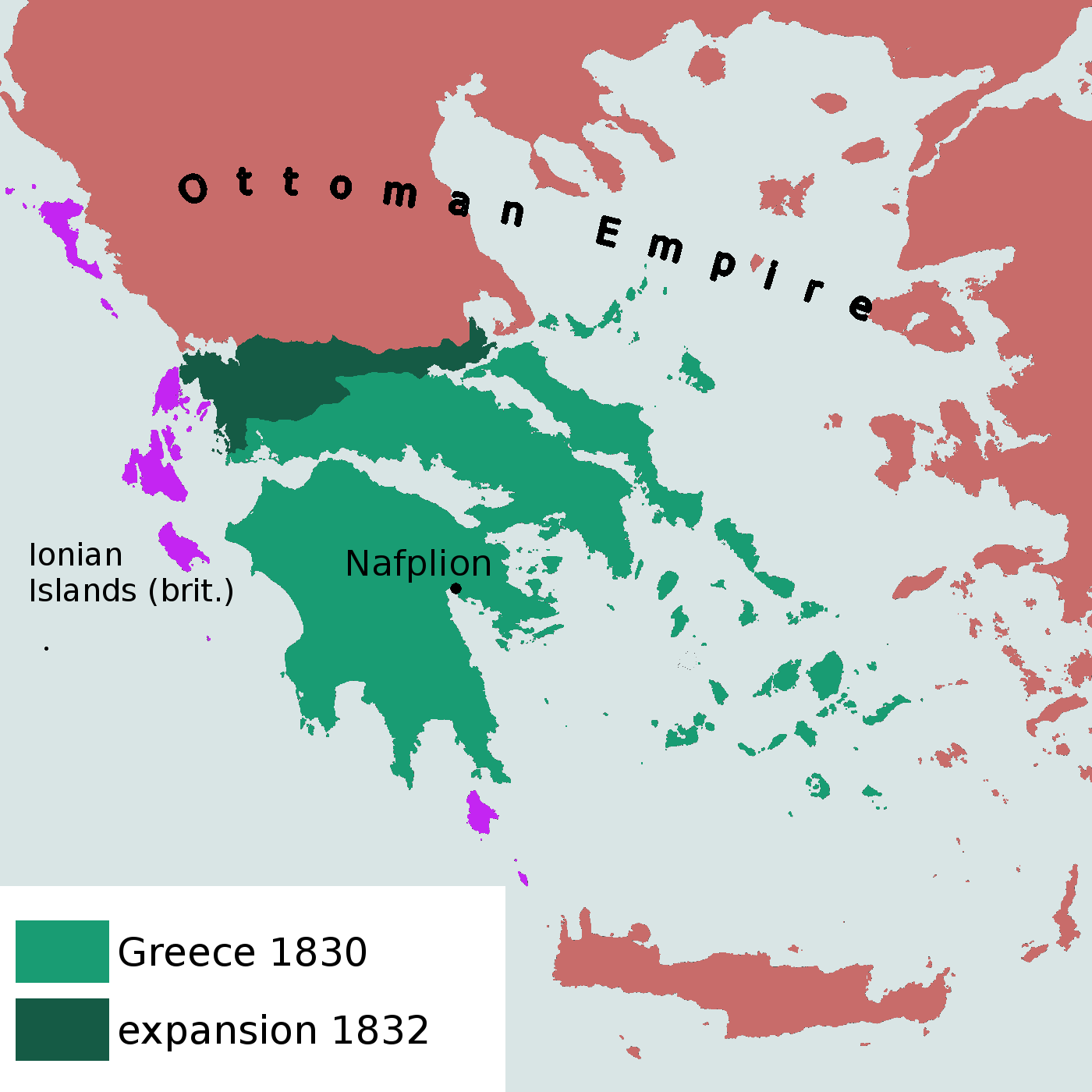
Line in light green.

The Aspropotamos–Spercheios line or Achelöos–Spercheios line (Greek: Γραμμή Ασπροποτάμου/Αχελώου - Σπερχειού) was Greece's first land border with the Ottoman Empire, established by the London Protocol (1830).

The border was decided upon by the three Great Powers (United Kingdom of Great Britain and Ireland, Russian Empire and the Kingdom of France). It would start at the mouth of the Achelous River (then known as "Aspropotamos"), pass through Artotina along the ridge of Mount Oeta and reach the Malian Gulf at the mouth of the Spercheios River, passing south of the city of Zitouni (modern Lamia), which would remain in Ottoman hands. The island of Euboea (Negroponte), the Northern Sporades, Skyros, and the Cyclades including the island of Amorgos would become part of Greece.

It was replaced in the Treaty of Constantinople (1832) by the Ambracian Gulf – Pagasetic Gulf line (or Arta–Volos line), which had already been envisaged in the London Protocol (1829) as the northern boundary of an autonomous Greek state under Ottoman suzerainty.
