= New Liberalism =

New Liberalism may refer to:

- New liberalism (ideology), variant of social liberalism that emerged in Europe in the late 19th century
- New Liberalism (Colombia), a political party
