= Treaty of Constantinople (1832) =

Treaty setting the territory of new Kingdom of Greece

The Treaty of Constantinople signed on 21 July 1832 and was the product of the London Conference of 1832 which opened in February 1832 with the participation of the Great Powers (Britain, France and Russia) on the one hand and the Ottoman Empire on the other. On 21 July 1832 British ambassador Sir Stratford Canning and the other representatives concluded the Treaty of Constantinople, which set the boundaries of the new Kingdom of Greece along the Arta–Volos line.

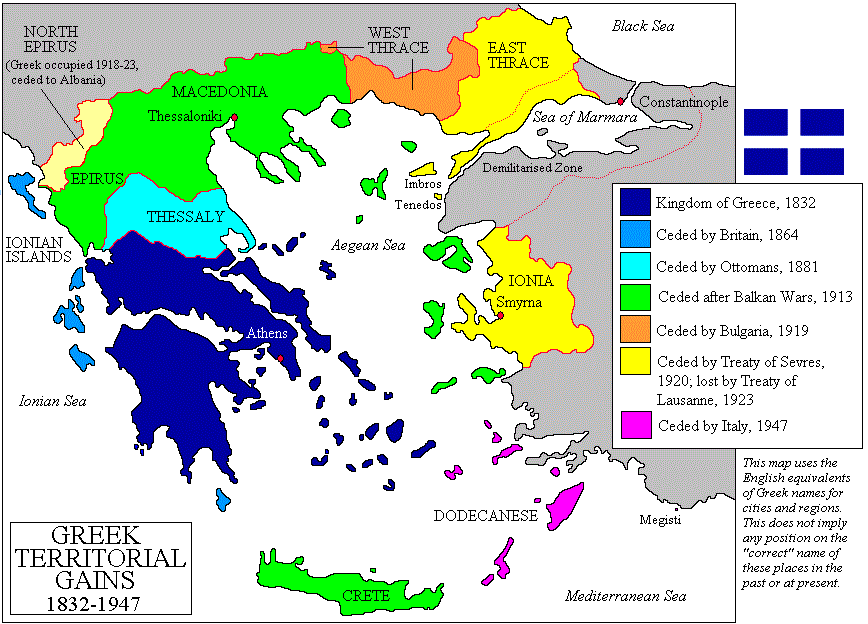
Map showing the original territory of the Kingdom of Greece as laid down in the Treaty of 1832 (in dark blue)

Under the Treaty of London signed on 7 May 1832 between Bavaria and the protecting Powers, and dealing with how the Regency was to be managed until Otto reached his majority (while also concluding the second Greek loan, for a sum of £2,400,000 sterling), Greece was defined as an independent kingdom, with the Arta–Volos line as its northern frontier.

The factors that shaped the treaty included the refusal of Leopold of Saxe-Coburg-Gotha to assume the Greek throne. He was not at all satisfied with the Aspropotamos–Spercheios line, which replaced the more favorable Arta–Volos line considered by the Great Powers earlier. The withdrawal of Leopold I as a candidate for the throne of Greece and the July Revolution in France delayed the final settlement of the frontiers of the new kingdom until a new government was formed in London. Lord Palmerston, who took over as British foreign secretary, agreed to the Arta–Volos line. However, the secret note on Crete, which the Bavarian plenipotentiary communicated to the Courts of Britain, France, and Russia, bore no fruit.

The Great Powers ratified the terms of the Constantinople Arrangement in connection with the border between Greece and the Ottoman Empire in the London Protocol of 30 August 1832, which marked the end of the Greek War of Independence and established modern Greece as an independent state free of the Ottoman Empire. The borders of the Kingdom of Greece were reiterated in the Protocol of London signed on 30 August 1832 by the Great Powers, which ratified the terms of the Constantinople Treaty in connection with the border between Greece and the Ottoman Empire and marked the end of the Greek War of Independence creating modern Greece as an independent state free of the Ottoman Empire. The Ottoman Empire was indemnified in the sum of 40,000,000 piastres for the loss of the territory.

== See also ==
- London Conference of 1832
- List of treaties
- Treaty of Sèvres
- Treaty of Lausanne
