= Toumba Stadium =

Football stadium in Thessaloniki, Greece

PAOK Stadium
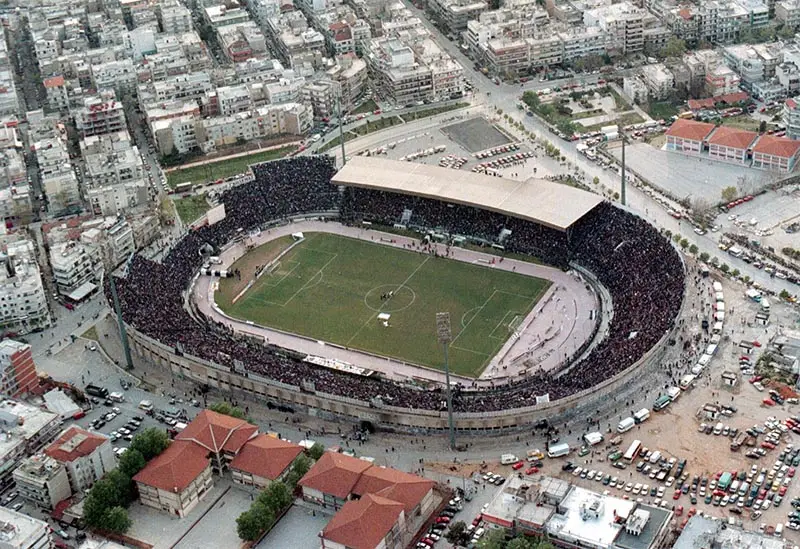
- Panoramic view of Toumba Stadium on 10 February 2008
- Interactive map of PAOK Stadium
- Location: Thessaloniki, Greece
- Coordinates: 40°36′50″N 22°58′21″E
- Owner: AC PAOK
- Operator: PAOK FC
- Capacity: 28,703
- Executive suites: 14 5-man suites each 12
- Surface: Grass
- Scoreboard: LED
- Record attendance: 45,252 (19 December 1976, PAOK vs AEK)
- Field size: 106 m × 71 m (348 ft × 233 ft)
- Public transit: Papafi metro station (2024)

Construction
- Groundbreaking: 1957
- Built: 1958–1959
- Opened: 6 September 1959
- Renovated: 1985, 1998, 2003–2004, 2013
- Expanded: 1962, 1965, 1972
- Cost: ₯ 6,000,000 (€17,608)
- Architect: Minas Trempelas
- Structural engineer: Antonis Triglianos

Tenants
- PAOK FC (1959–present); Greece National Football Team (selected matches); PAOK FC (women) (selected matches)

Website
- PAOK FC official website

Toumba Stadium (Greek: Στάδιο Τούμπας) is a multi-purpose stadium in Thessaloniki, Greece, mainly used for football. It is property of AC PAOK and hosts PAOK FC since its completion in 1959. The official name of the stadium is simply PAOK Stadium (Greek: Στάδιο ΠΑΟΚ), but through the years it has become synonymous with the borough it is built at, the borough of Toumba.

== History ==
The construction started in 1958 and completed in 1959. Patrons on the project were the Ministry of Culture and Sport (Greece), which offered the amount of 1,100,000 drachmas, while the Hellenic National Defence General Staff owned the space and contributed decisively to expropriate it for the stadium.

The then defense minister Georgios Themelis vouched for the expropriation of the area of Toumba Stadium during the Konstantinos Karamanlis government in 1958. The architect of the project was Minas Trempelas and the engineer was Antonis Trigliano. The inauguration event was scheduled for Sunday 6 September 1959 with a friendly encounter against AEK Athens.

The stadium is located in the district of Toumba in eastern Thessaloniki. Its original capacity was around 20,000 and would be expanded continuously until 1971, when it was finally expanded to 45,000 capacity, becoming the second largest stadium in the country, behind Kaftanzoglio Stadium, home of rivals Iraklis. After the collapse of Toumba's Gate 8 in March 1980 and the Karaiskakis Stadium disaster in February 1981, the legal capacity was lowered to 41,073 until the installation of seating on all stands in 1998, which reduced the capacity to 32,000 (seated). The introduction of security zones in 2000 further reduced the capacity to the current capacity of 29,000 seats.

A record attendance of 45,252 has been recorded in a 1st division football match between PAOK and AEK on 19 December 1976. The stadium also regularly hosted local athletics events in the 20th century. It also was the venue for the 2003 Greek Cup Final.

Gate 1, where the teams enter the stadium on a matchday, saw a major update in the summer of 1985 when a cantilever roof was installed, which got entirely replaced in preparation for the 2004 Olympics 18 years later.

The stadium's official name is simply "PAOK Stadium", however it is commonly referred to as "Toumba" after the district where is located. It is also nicknamed "Cathedral" by PAOK fans.

Toumba Stadium is infamous for its hostile atmosphere, a factor that led to the attribution of the Stadium as 'The Black Hell'. On all home matches, when the players walk out of the tunnel, the song Hells Bells by AC/DC is heard from the stadium's speakers.

=== 2004 upgrade ===
The stadium has hosted several games of the Greece national football team. The stadium was selected as one of the training venues for the football tournaments of the 2004 Olympic Games, and due to this it was heavily upgraded. The relevant works commenced in 2003 and the stadium was again ready to be used in the summer of 2004 while boasting a brand new look. The most important modification was the construction of a new four-storey building behind the main west stand (Gates 1, 2 and 3). The new building of the stadium houses a number of VIP boxes and VIP lounges, service areas for TV and the press and new club offices. A new roof was also installed over the west stand, while other works included new seats, upgrades for the dressing rooms, a new pitch and re-enforcement of the concrete pillars below the north curved stand (Gate 4 and Gate 4A).

=== Recent upgrades ===
After the advent of the new major shareholder Ivan Savvidis in 2012, a gradual renovation began. Big changes began in 2012–13, but most of the changes were made in 2014–15 for the European obligations of PAOK in the UEFA Europa League, starting from the central part of the stadium. A presidential suite was created and a gradual renovation for the media theories for convenience and functionality in the building of the third floor. In early September 2015, the turf was changed.

== New Toumba stadium Project ==
PAOK administration have already presented to the Greek public authorities an architecture study of a new stadium at Toumba. The Supreme Civil and Criminal Court of Greece approved a proposal to set up the complete redevelopment of Toumba Stadium in April 2022, deeming legal a draft Presidential Decree concerning the approval of a Special Urban Plan for the district of Toumba, where the venue is located. On 21 June 2022, PAOK has formalized the beginning of a collaboration with a team consisting of domestic engineering and consulting firm SALFO and global architectural design company Populous to deliver the project. It is estimated that PAOK will be granted a building permit in 2023 and the new stadium will be completed by 2026 and will have a capacity of 41,926 spectators. PAOK would probably move to Kaftanzoglio Stadium until the new stadium is built.

On 16 June 2025, AC PAOK announced that Greek billionaire Telis Mistakidis will help fund the project. Reactions about this announcement were mixed among PAOK supporters, with some praising Mistakidis for his eagerness to help with the project. There was skepticism about the circumstances surrounding the announcement, with owner Ivan Savvidis stating that he was shocked on the fact that AC PAOK hadn't notified him about this new partnership. Days passed and on June 23rd, Savvidis finally shared new information about the new stadium project for the first time in years, stating that he'll be the one completing the project. Three days later, on PAOK's official website, the inner and outer design of the new stadium were revealed, as well as a VIP lounge. The exterior view is set to have a pattern that matches an eagle's wings, while the inner part will have the similar form of stadiums such as the Stade Vélodrome.

The New Stadium plans present some significant changes to the original stadium, notably a giant roof covering the entire stadium which counters a common criticism of the current ground regarding exposure to weather and elements outside of Gates 1 and 2. The existing stands would be demolished and reconstructed, moving closer to the pitch and eliminating the distance from the former running track.

== Major events ==
Event	Date	Time	Team #1	Result	Team #2	Competition	Attendance
Inaugural match	6 September 1959	17:30 EEST	PAOK	1–0	AEK Athens	Friendly	≈15,000
European attendance record	16 September 1975	21:00 EEST	PAOK	1–0	Barcelona	1975–76 UEFA Cup	45,200
Attendance record	19 December 1976	14:30 EET	PAOK	0–0	AEK Athens	1976–77 Alpha Ethniki	45,252
Maradona's visit	6 October 1988	21:00 EEST	PAOK	1–1	Napoli	1988–89 UEFA Cup	39,848
1992 Greek Cup Final, 1st leg	20 May 1992	18:00 EEST	PAOK	1–1	Olympiacos	1991–92 Greek Cup	25,744
Giorgos Koudas testimonial match	20 September 1995	20:00 EEST	Greece	0–2	FR Yugoslavia	Friendly	≈25,000
2003 Greek Cup Final	17 May 2003	21:15 EEST	PAOK	1–0	Aris	2002–03 Greek Cup	18,703

== Gallery ==
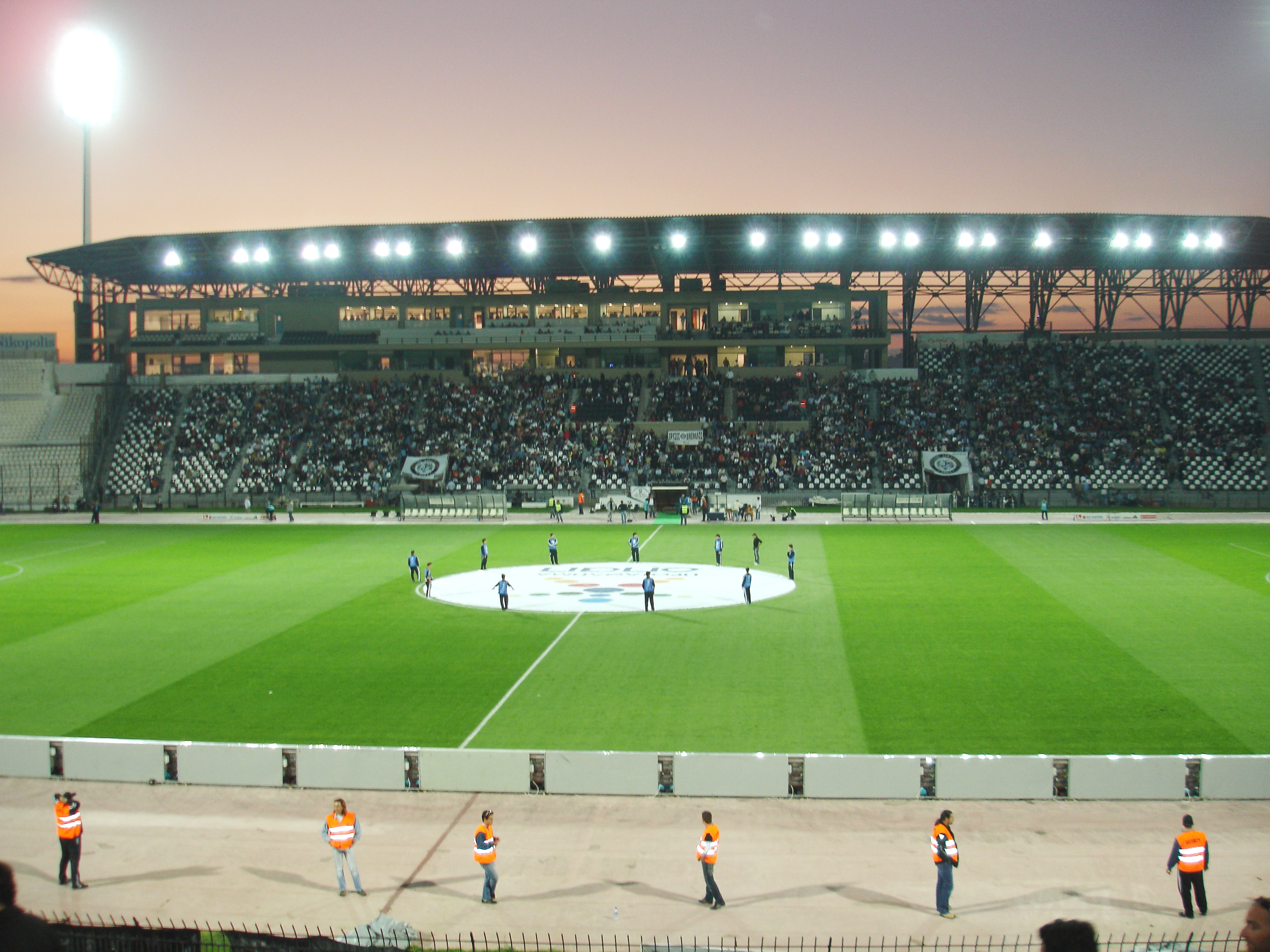
Inside view

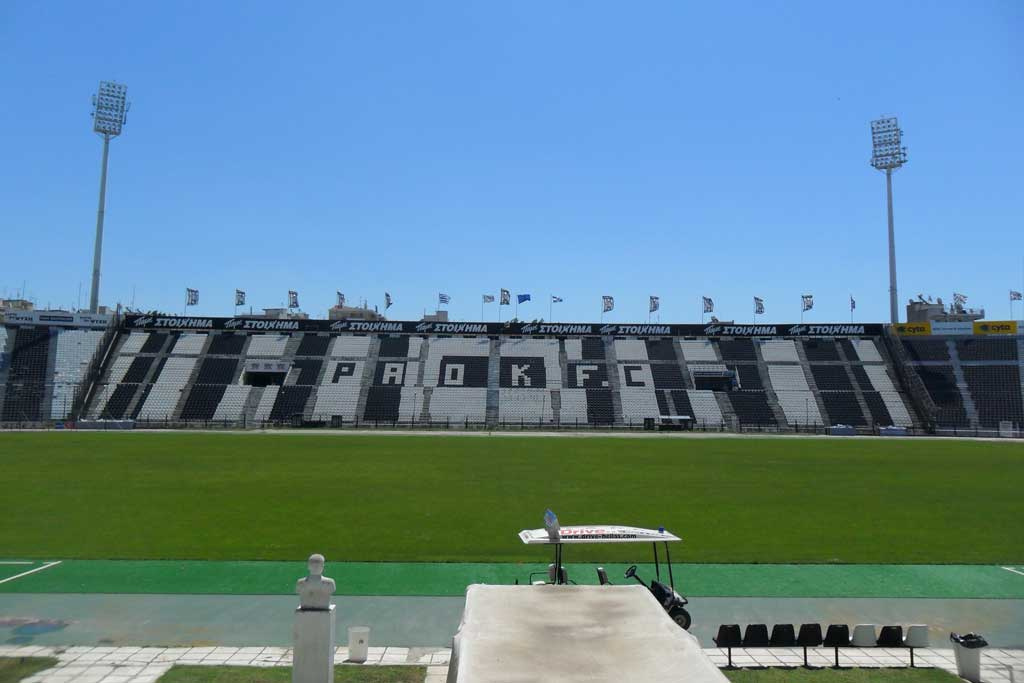
Inside view

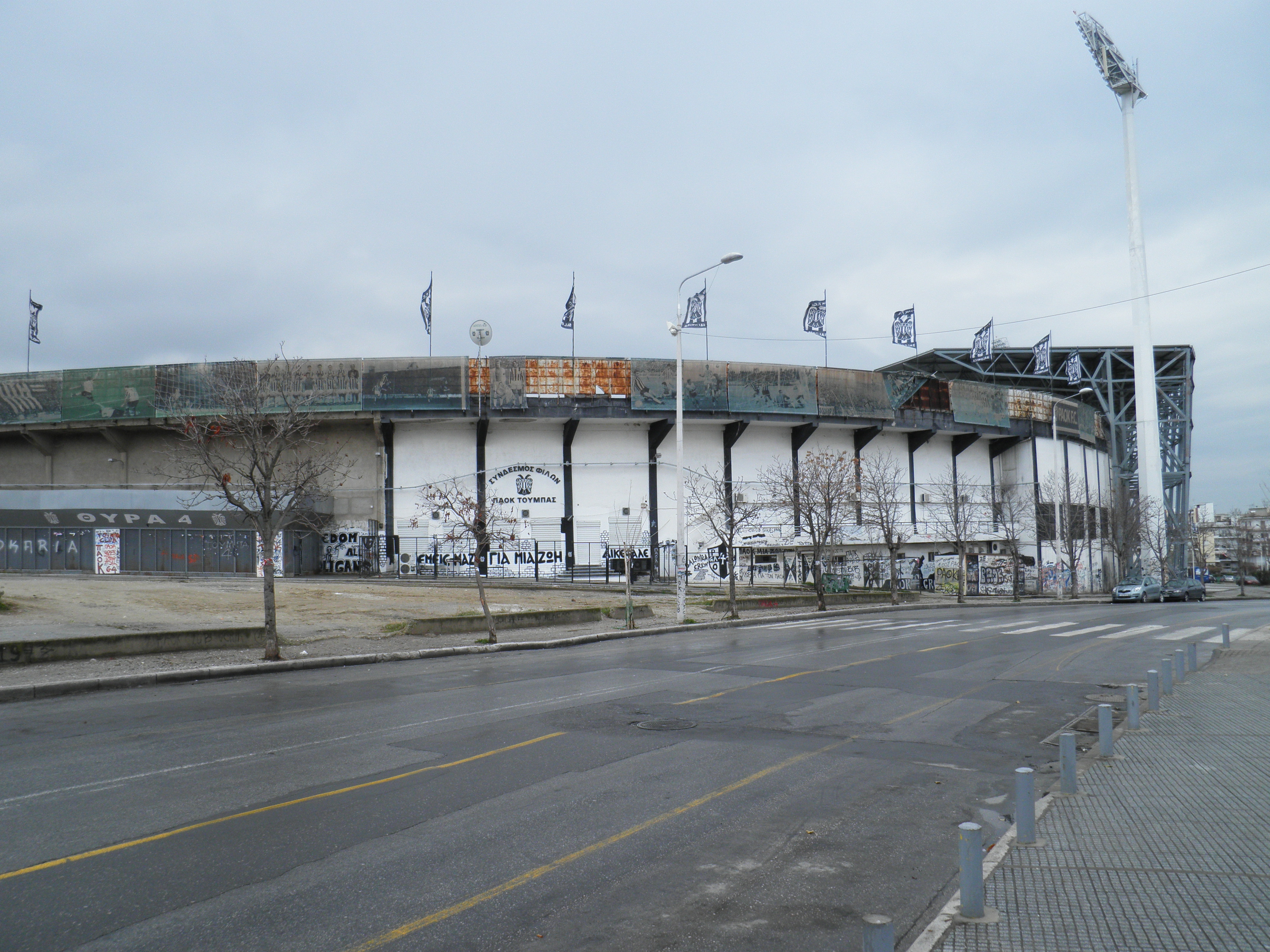
External view

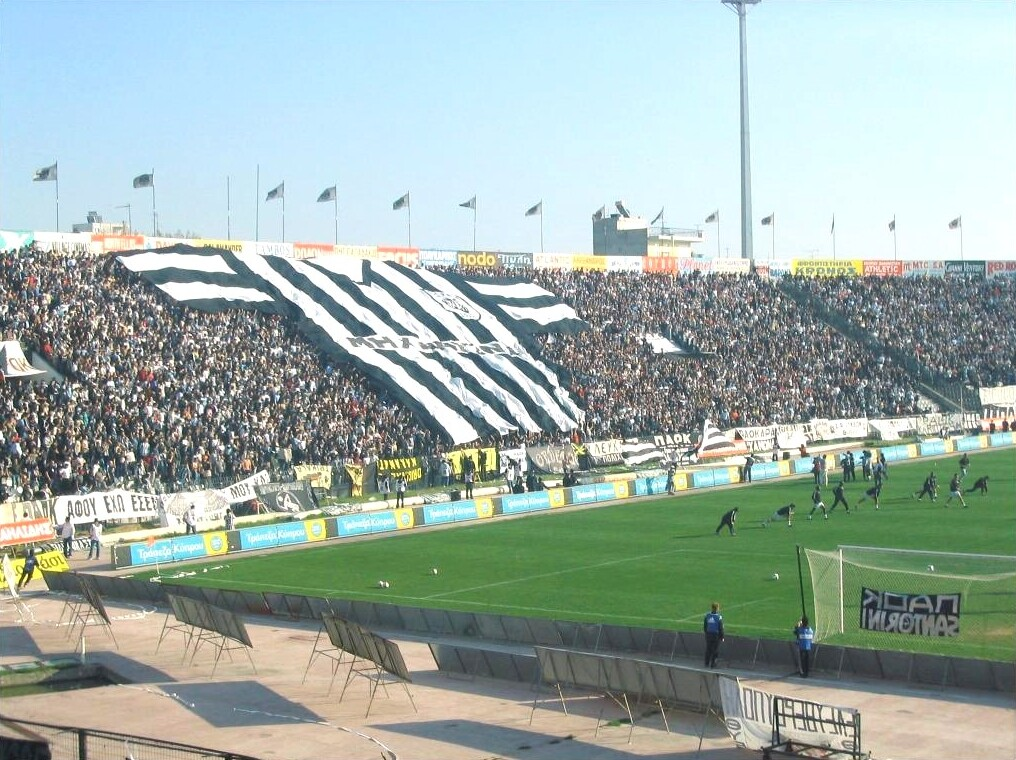
Big shirt in the stadium

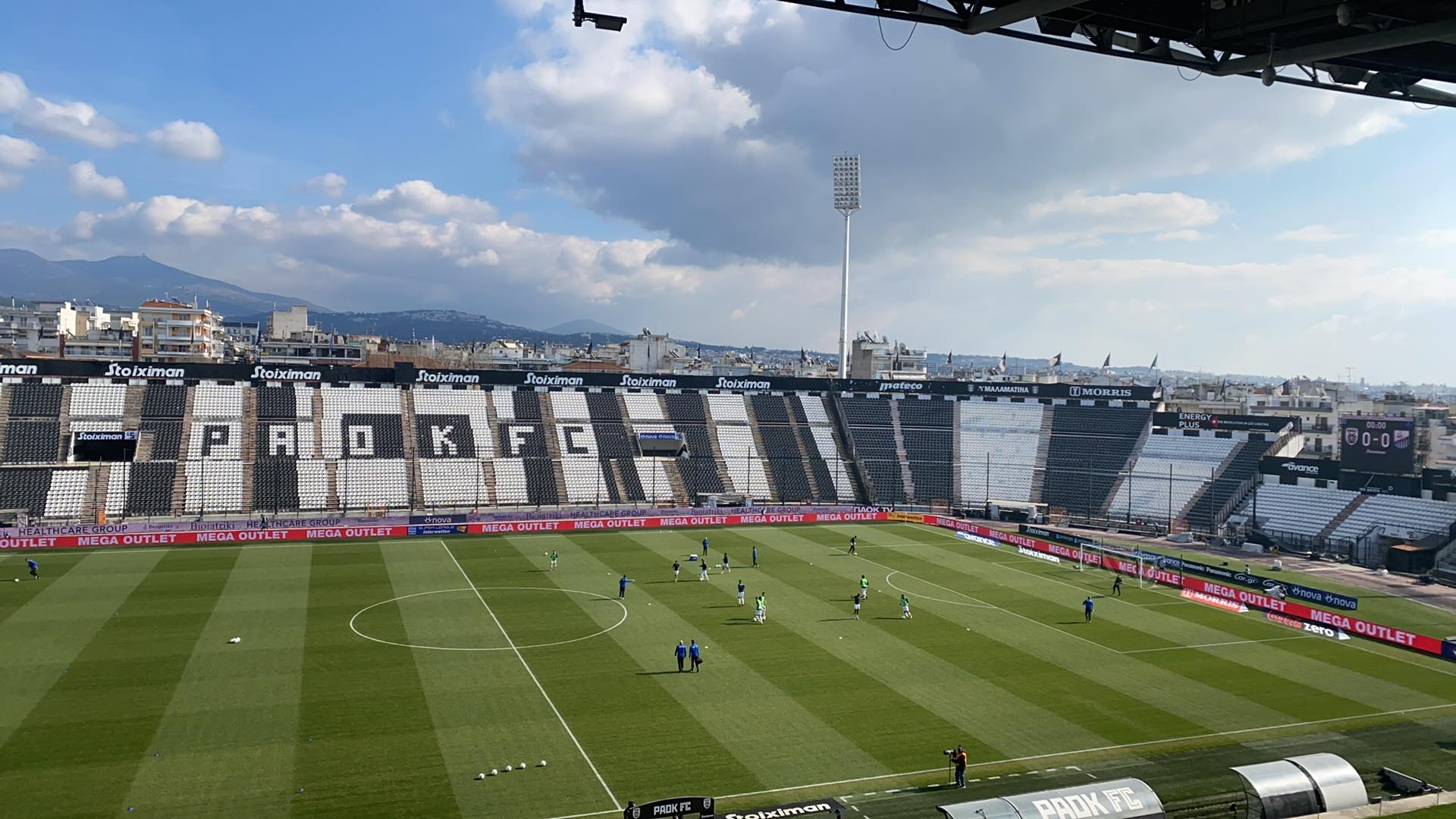
Team training

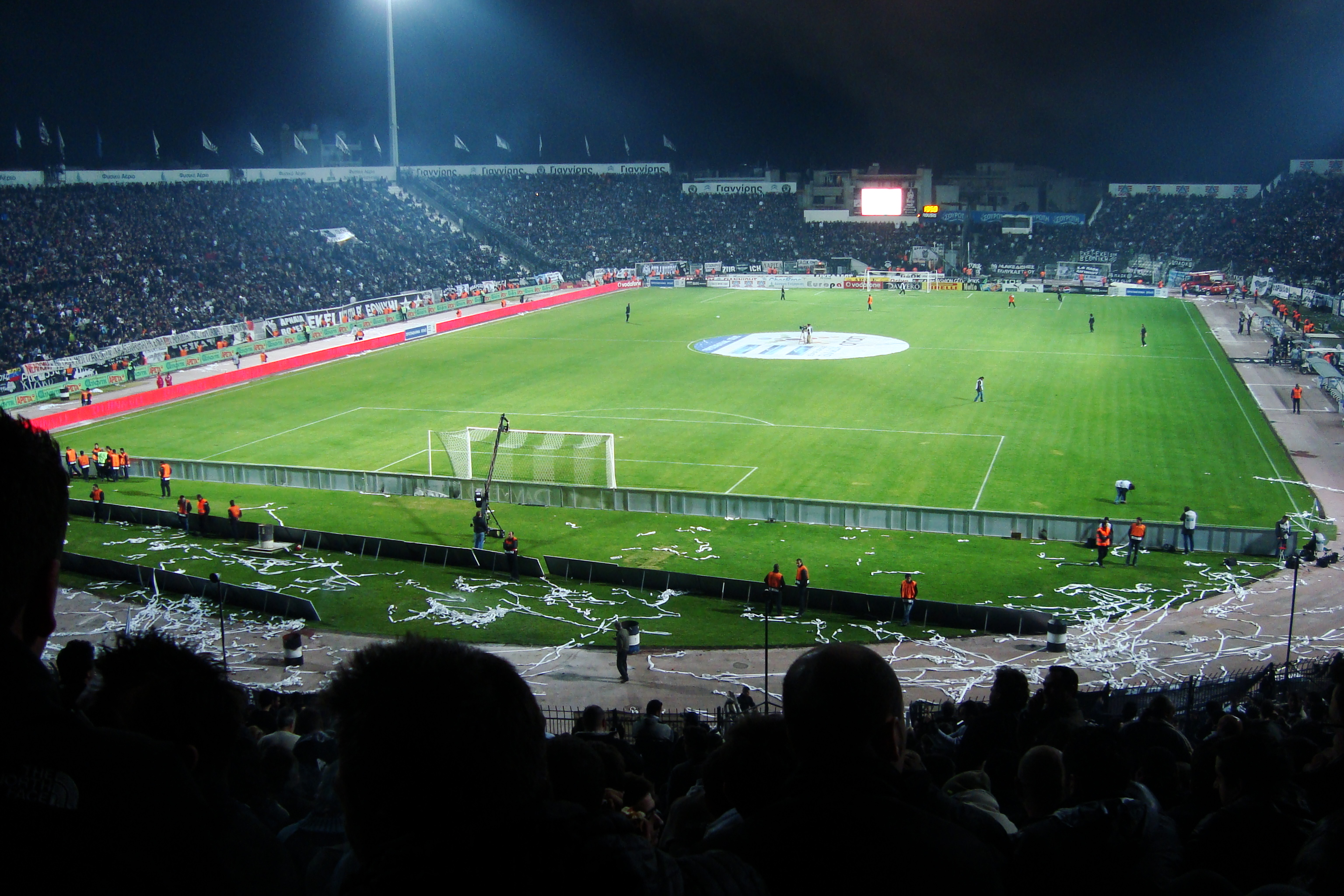
View from Gate 4

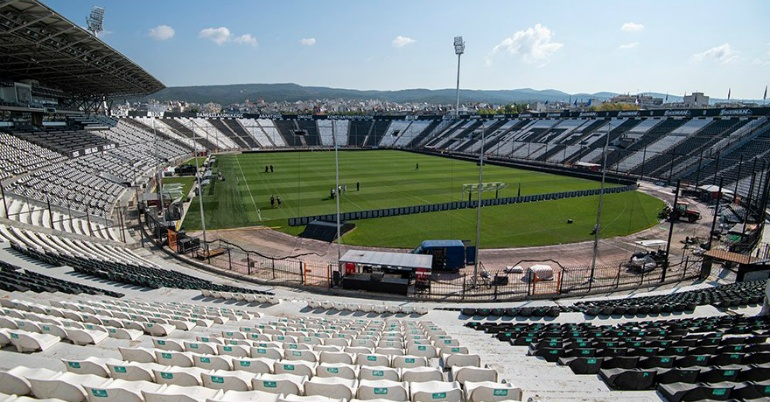
Inside view

== See also ==
- PAOK
- PAOK FC
