= Konstantinos Georgakopoulos =

Greek lawyer and politician

- Κωνσταντίνος Γεωργακόπουλος
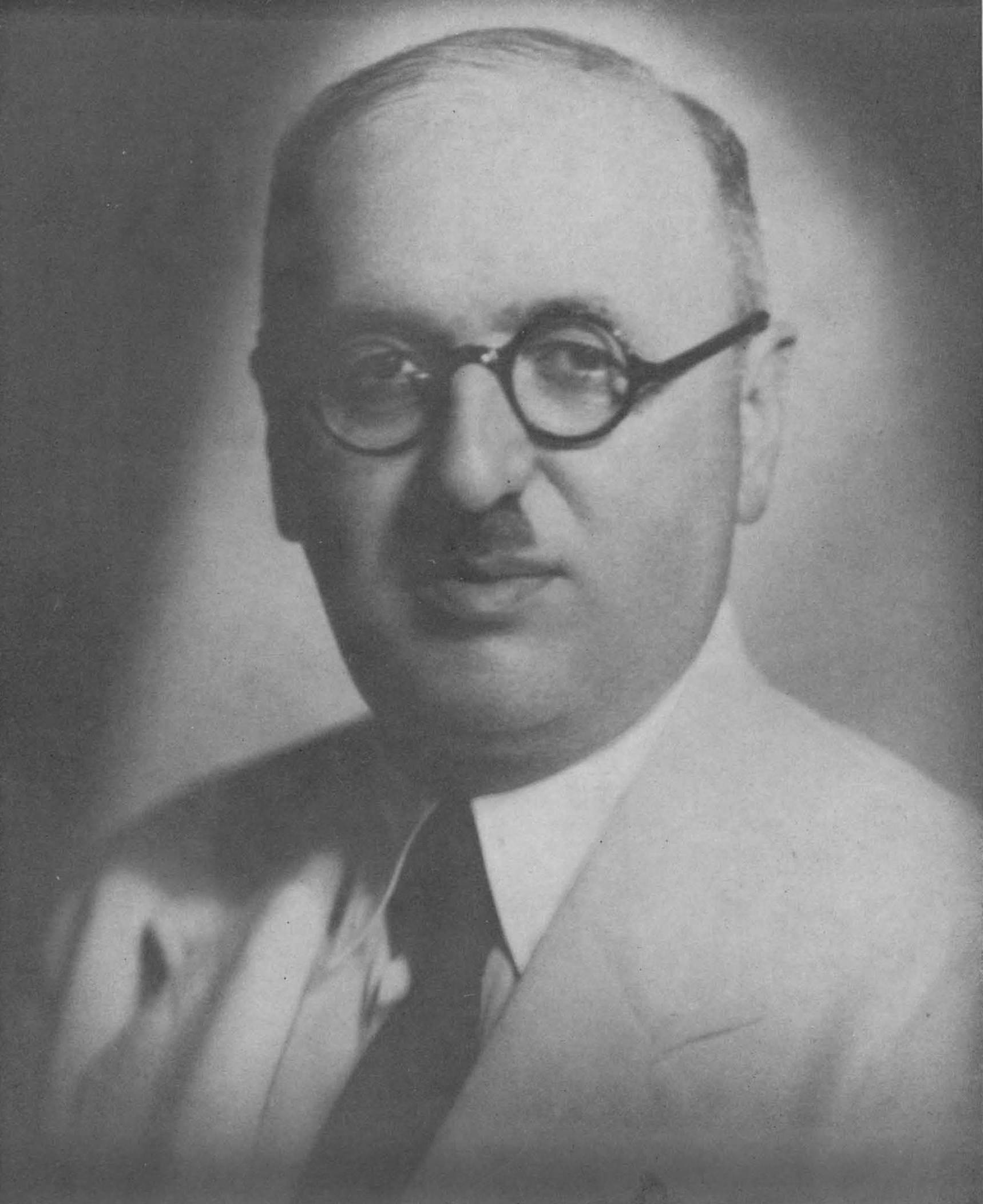

Prime Minister of Greece
- In office 5 March 1958 – 17 May 1958
- Monarch: Paul
- Preceded by: Konstantinos Karamanlis
- Succeeded by: Konstantinos Karamanlis

Minister of the Interior
- In office 5 March 1958 – 17 May 1958
- Prime Minister: Himself
- Preceded by: Dimitrios Makris
- Succeeded by: Dimitrios Makris

Minister of Education
- In office 6 August 1936 – 25 November 1938
- Prime Minister: Ioannis Metaxas
- Preceded by: Nikolaos Louvaris
- Succeeded by: Ioannis Metaxas

Personal details
- Born: 26 December 1890 Tripoli, Greece
- Died: 26 July 1973 (aged 82) Athens, Greece
- Party: People's Party
- Occupation: Politician, Lawyer

Konstantinos Georgakopoulos (Greek: Κωνσταντίνος Γεωργακόπουλος; 26 December 1890 – 26 July 1973) was a Greek lawyer, politician and Prime Minister of Greece.

== Biography ==
He was born in Mostitsi (Drymos), Greece, and studied law at the University of Athens. In 1915, he became a military court judge. He left the military justice system in 1923 with the rank of colonel. He subsequently served, until 1951, as a lecturer in law at his former university.

In 1928, he joined the People's Party. From November 1935 to August 1936, he served as an Undersecretary in the cabinets of Konstantinos Demertzis and Ioannis Metaxas, respectively. He was Minister for Education from August 1936 to November 1938 under Metaxas. In 1948, he became President of the Greek Red Cross.

From 5 March to 17 May 1958, he served as prime minister and Minister for the Interior in the caretaker government for the 1958 elections. He participated in many Board of directors organizations and was honored with several awards and medals. He died in Athens on July 26, 1973.

Political offices
Preceded by Konstantinos Karamanlis	Prime Minister of Greece (caretaker); 5 March–17 May 1958	Succeeded by Konstantinos Karamanlis
