= Christos Sartzetakis =

President of Greece from 1985 to 1990

- Χρήστος Σαρτζετάκης
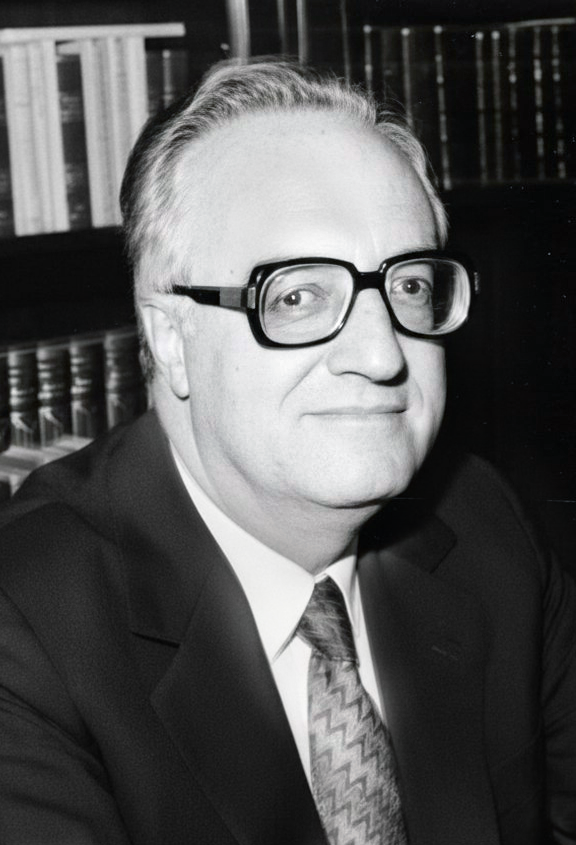
- Sartzetakis in 1985

President of Greece
- In office 29 March 1985 – 5 May 1990
- Prime Minister: Andreas Papandreou (1985–1989); Tzannis Tzannetakis (Jul–Oct 1989); Ioannis Grivas (acting) (Oct–Nov 1989); Xenophon Zolotas (1989–1990); Konstantinos Mitsotakis (Apr–May 1990)
- Preceded by: Ioannis Alevras (acting)
- Succeeded by: Konstantinos Karamanlis

Personal details
- Born: 6 April 1929 Neapoli, Thessaloniki, Greece
- Died: 3 February 2022 (aged 92) Laiko General Hospital, Athens, Greece
- Resting place: First Cemetery of Athens
- Citizenship: Greece
- Party: Independent
- Spouse: Efi Argyriou
- Children: 1
- Education: Aristotle University of Thessaloniki (LLB); University of Paris Faculty of Law (LLB)
- Occupation: Politician; jurist; lawyer; writer
- Awards: Order of Prince Henry; Order of the Redeemer (1985); Academy of Athens Award (2018)
- Website: Official website

Christos Sartzetakis (Greek: Χρήστος Σαρτζετάκης; 6 April 1929 – 3 February 2022) was a Greek attorney who served as the president of Greece from 1985 to 1990.

== Early life and education ==
Sartzetakis was born in Neapoli, Thessaloniki, on 6 April 1929. His father, who served as a Gendarmerie officer in Thessaloniki, was a Cretan born in Kandanos, Chania, and his mother was a Greek Macedonian born in Sklithro, Florina.

He obtained a degree in law from the Aristotle University of Thessaloniki.

== Legal career ==
Sartzetakis entered the judicial career in 1955, became Justice of the Peace at Kleisoura, Kastoria, and in 1963, served as judge of the Court of First Instance of Thessaloniki.

=== Assassination of Grigoris Lambrakis and imprisonment by junta ===
On 27 May 1963, the left-wing Member of Parliament Grigoris Lambrakis died four days after being beaten. Sartzetakis was called by the attorney of the Greek Supreme Court Konstantinos Kollias to proceed with the investigation, as the case was transferred to the Court of First Instance of Thessaloniki. In March 1964, he sent a letter to the Minister of Justice Polychronis Polychronidis in which he implicated the police and the State as responsible for the murder. Together with the prosecutor Stylianos Boutis, he ordered the preventive detention of four officers.

The trial began on 3 October 1966 and lasted 67 days at the Criminal Court of Thessaloniki. Sarzetakis and the prosecutor Pavlos Dellaportas were under intense pressure to quickly close the case without continuing the investigation. Two months later, the verdict was announced in which 21 defendants and all agents were acquitted, thus rejecting the prosecutor's proposal. Only two persons were convicted as perpetrators, and both were pardoned by the Junta shortly thereafter. Kollias, who soon became Prime Minister under the military junta, claimed that "Sartzetakis will answer to me." In his memoirs, published after leaving the presidency, he stressed that Lambrakis' death was a clear political assassination with direct state involvement.

Sartzetakis was expelled from the judiciary along with 29 magistrates with the Greek Junta's Constitutional Act of 28 May 1968, allegedly because "in the exercise of his functions, he acted in a discriminatory manner, motivated by his political convictions in favor of a political party, in a way that violated the confidence of the citizens in his impartiality".

The Lambrakis investigation was the theme of the 1966 novel Z: Fictional Documentary of a Crime by Vassilis Vassilikos, and Sartzetakis was portrayed by Jean-Louis Trintignant in the novel's 1969 film adaptation by Costas Gavras.

After the Lambrakis prosecution, with permission to study commercial law and European Community law, Sartzetakis moved to Paris.

He was twice arrested by the Junta, first on Christmas Eve of 1970, and was tortured by Greek Military Police. After an international outcry, he was released from the Junta's prison in 1971.

=== Restoration of democracy ===
In September 1974, after the toppling of the dictatorship and the restoration of democracy in Greece, Sartzetakis was completely rehabilitated. As a member of the Court of Appeals, in 1976 he rejected Germany's request to extradite the terrorist Rolf Pohle, arguing that his crimes were political and the Greek constitution prevented extradition in such cases. The prosecutor of the Supreme Court initiated disciplinary proceedings against him and the other two judges who issued that decision. He was named president of the Court of Appeals in 1981 and became a member of the Supreme Civil and Criminal Court of Greece in 1982.

== President of Greece (1985–1990) ==
=== Election ===
The atmosphere just prior to the 1985 presidential elections was particularly unstable politically and the media of the time and the political parties considered the re-election of Konstantinos Karamanlis as President of the Republic as certain. It was then that the Prime Minister Andreas Papandreou nominated Sartzetakis, a judge who had not been involved in politics, as a candidate to succeed Karamanlis, the surprising announcement and the tactics employed by Papandreou for making Sartzetakis president resulted in constitutional crisis. On 10 March 1985, immediately following the public announcement of this decision, Karamanlis resigned in the face of PASOK's unexpected rejection of his re-election and because of his opposition to Papandreou's recently announced plans to reform the 1975 Constitution and transfer the few executive powers from the President of the Republic to the Prime Minister. Speaker of the Hellenic Parliament Ioannis Alevras took over as acting President of Greece.

The first vote in the Greek parliament took place on 17 March, in which Sartzetakis obtained 178 votes as a sole candidate. The second vote was held on 23 March and he obtained support from 181 of the deputies. That vote was controversial as the ballot papers were of different colors, with Sartzetakis' being blue and the others white, causing a violation of the secrecy of the vote. It was not until the third and stormy vote, held on 29 March, for Sartzetakis to be elected the new president to a 5-year term, thanks to the votes of the 180 deputies from PASOK and the Communist Party. Shortly thereafter, he issued a televised message in which he called for unity, reaffirming that "our country is too small to support the luxury of national divisions". He was sworn in on 30 March in a ceremony boycotted by the 112 deputies of the conservative opposition (ND), who refused to attend based on the allegation that the election had been rendered unconstitutional when the acting Greek president Alevras, the then president of the Parliament, was allowed to vote.

=== Tenure ===
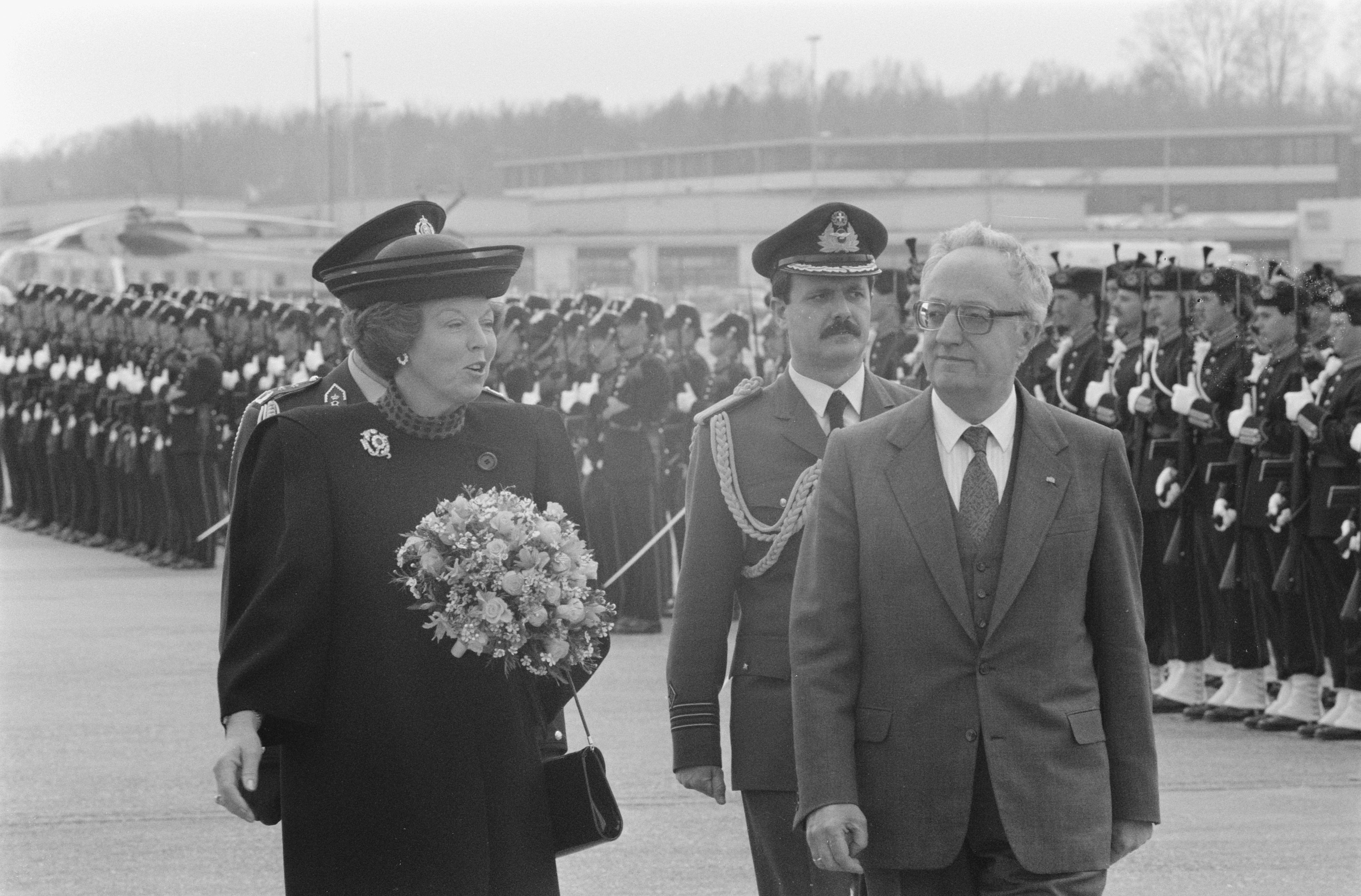
Sartzetakis with Queen Beatrix in a state visit to the Netherlands, 1989.

In 1986, Sartzetakis strongly opposed the bill that legalized abortion in the country. Between 1989 and 1990, he had to face an unprecedented triple electoral repetition due to the inability of the parties to form a government, mainly because to the Koskotas scandal implicating Papandreou and Papandreou's change of electoral law to prevent opposition party in gaining majority power. In 1987, Christos Roussos, a young homosexual sentenced to life imprisonment in 1976 for murder, went on hunger strike. Faced with this situation, and heeding his appeal for a mistrial because he had murdered the man who wanted to prostitute him, the Papandreou government pardoned him, but was met with Sartzetakis' refusal to grant it. This fact provoked a wave of indignation accusing Sartzetakis of being a homophobe and soured his relationship with Prime Minister Papandreou. The pardon ultimately was granted in 1990 by Karamanlis.

His personality as president was assiduously criticized and satirized. He demanded that newspapers refer to him as "Sir" with a capital "K" (Greek: Κύριος, romanized: Kyrios), used the conservative form of modern Greek called katharevousa and was altogether considered a strict formalist with rigid thinking far removed from the people. Sartzetakis did, however, ascribe the same honor to other political personalities, such as Prime Ministers Andreas Papandreou, Costas Simitis, Konstantinos Mitsotakis and later President Konstantinos Stephanopoulos.

He was criticized for buying air conditioners, expensive at the time, on his return from China and not passing through customs. However, it was claimed that the reported shopping while on official visits shouldn't be solely attributed to him. On two occasions he denounced comedians for making fun of him. In 1986 Sartzetakis appeared in a photograph with the-admittedly large-iron cross and the staff of Athanasius the Athonite at the Great Lavra. Harry Klynn satirized him on the cover of his album "Τίποτα". It was then that he was sued alleging insults to religious symbols, although Klynn was acquitted. The following year, the comedian Lakis Lazopoulos was arrested after publishing criticism of the political situation; he was acquitted.

Sartzetakis was also the first president to welcome resistance fighters to the Presidential Palace for the 24 July celebration.

Although he held anticommunist opinions and considered the defeat of DSE in 1949 a "national victory", he stressed the need for a genuine national reconciliation based on remembrance, thus disagreeing with the discontinuation of memorial services for the fallen of the Armed Forces and the taboo treatment of the subject in education. He, nevertheless, cooperated with Charilaos Florakis during the 1989 political crisis and eulogised him after his passing in 2005, praising the late communist leader for his "straightness, honesty and political rectitude".

His term of office ended on 5 May 1990 after failing to secure enough support for a second term in the 1990 presidential elections. Konstantinos Karamanlis took office for his second term as president after being elected the previous day by an absolute majority in Parliament. He then retired from public life, but continued to publish opinions in newspapers and articles on his website.

== Personal life and death ==
Sartzetakis married Efi Argyriou with whom he had a daughter.

On 3 December 2021, he was intubated due to acute pneumonia in Laiko Hospital in Athens. Sartzetakis died of acute respiratory failure on 3 February 2022, at the age of 92. The government announced a period of national mourning between 3 and 5 February, with flags lowered to half-mast. The state funeral took place on 7 February at Metropolitan Cathedral of Athens and he was later buried in First Cemetery of Athens in an intimate family ceremony.

== Honours ==
- Grand Collar of the Order of Prince Henry (Portugal, 1990)

Political offices
Preceded by Ioannis Alevras; Acting	President of Greece; 1985–1990	Succeeded by Konstantinos Karamanlis
