= 1990 Greek presidential election =

- 1st phase (1P); 19 February, 25 February, 3 March; 2nd phase (2P); 30 April, 5 May 1990
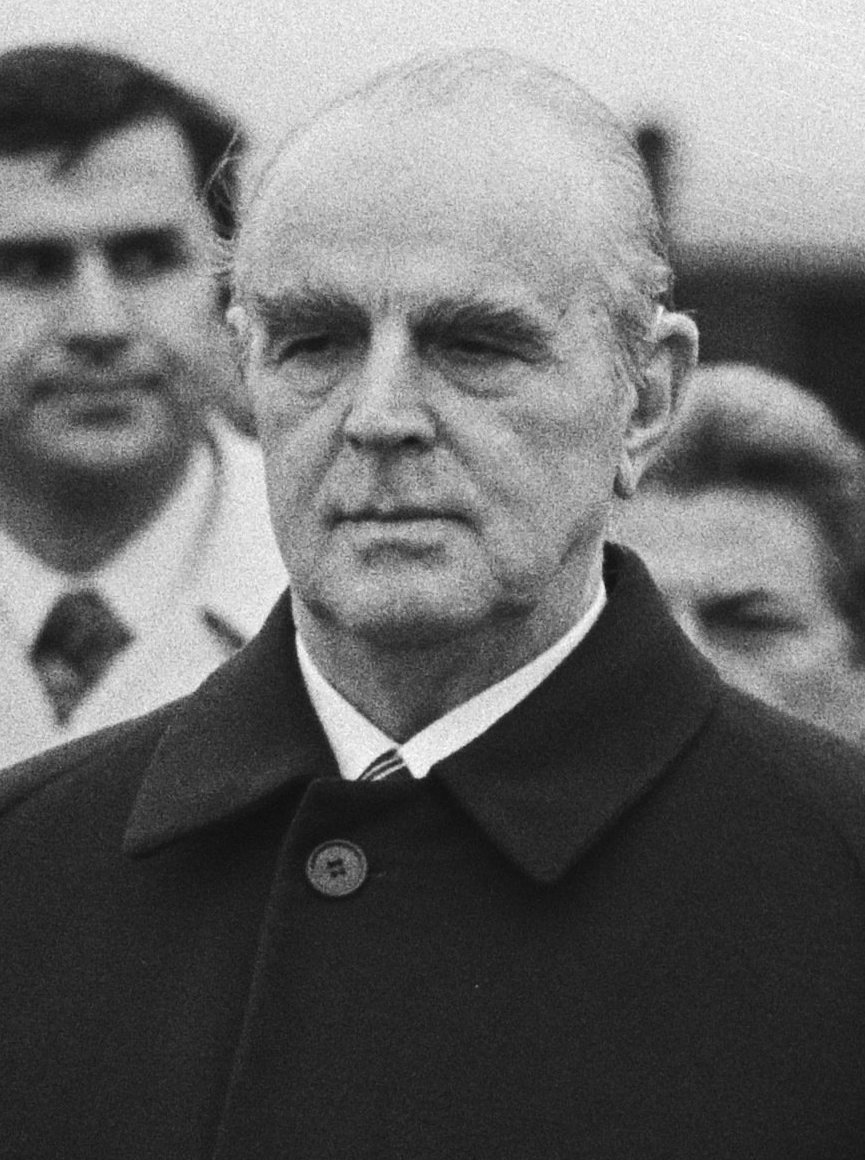

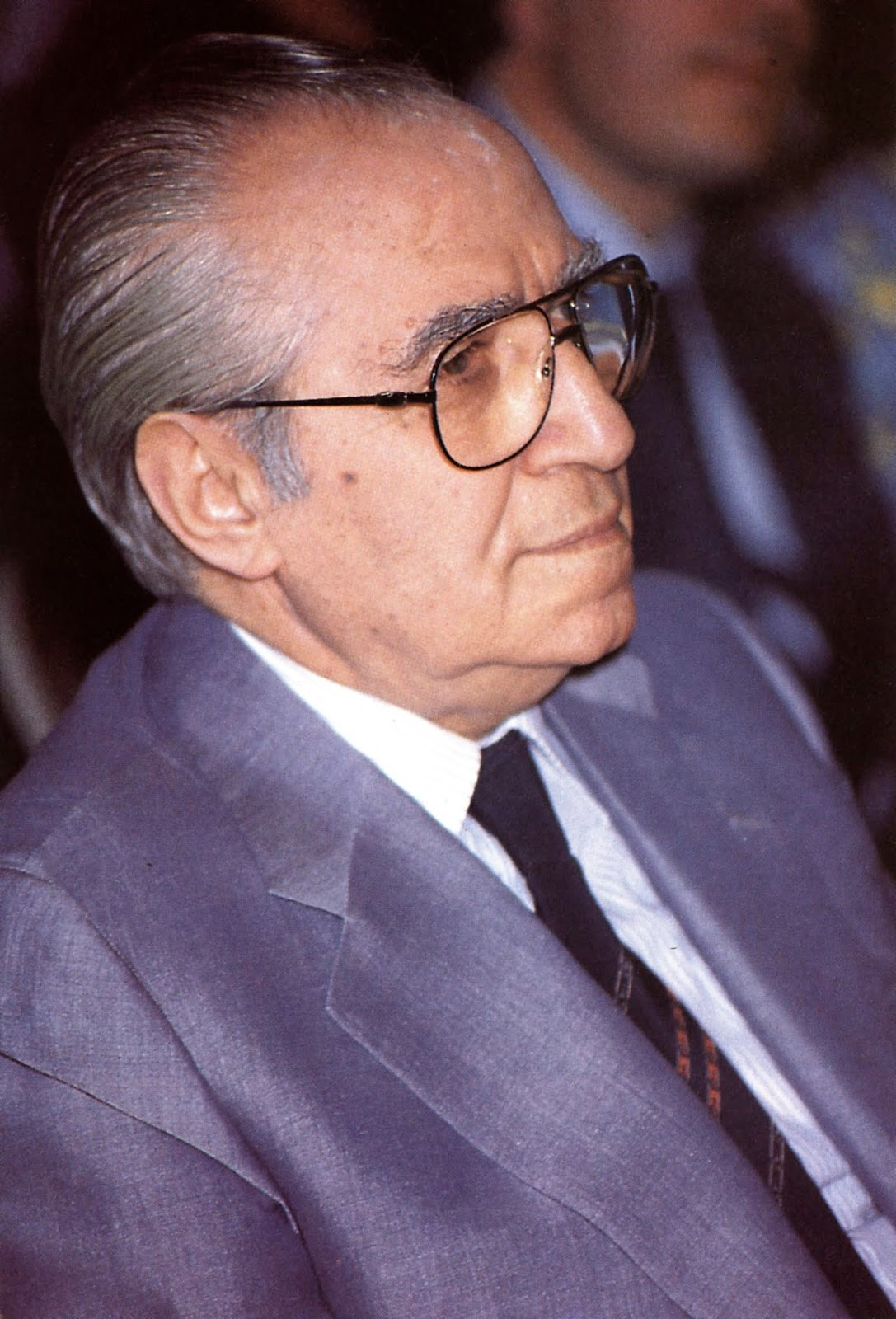

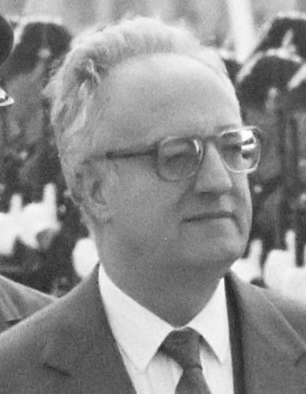

Nominee	Konstantinos Karamanlis	Ioannis Alevras	Christos Sartzetakis
Party	New Democracy	PASOK	Independent
1P/R1	No participation	No participation	151 (200 needed)
1P/R2	No participation	127 (200 needed)	21
1P/R3	No participation	128 (180 needed)	21
2P/R1	149 (180 needed)	123	No participation
2P/R2	153 (151 needed)	125	No participation
Nominee	Konstantinos Despotopoulos
Party	Synaspismos
1P/R1	No participation
1P/R2	No participation
1P/R3	No participation
2P/R1	21
2P/R2	21
President before election
Christos Sartzetakis
Independent
President after election
Konstantinos Karamanlis
ND

The 1990 Greek presidential election was an indirect election for the position of President of the Hellenic Republic was held by the Hellenic Parliament from February to May 1990.

The election took place following the "katharsis" period, during which a coalition government between conservative New Democracy and Leftist parties under Synaspismos indicted former Prime Minister Andreas Papandreou and four of his ministers over the Koskotas scandal. Additionally, memories remained vivid of the presidential election, during which Papandreou triggered a constitutional crisis to secure the presidency for his preferred candidate, Christos Sartzetakis, who was the presiding president of the election.

New Democracy's candidate was Konstantinos Karamanlis, who abstained in the first three rounds, while the other parties supported their candidates. As no candidate achieved the necessary votes in three consecutive rounds, the Greek Constitution required new national elections, which were held in April 1990. The elections paved the way for New Democracy's victory, however, its parliamentary majority was slim, making it challenging to elect a candidate of their choice for president. Karamanlis was elected president in the second round as the Constitution reduces the required electoral threshold in successive rounds when no candidate secures enough votes.

== Parliamentary votes for president ==
In the first phase, no candidate had sufficient votes to become president. Karamanlis refused to participate in this phase. In the first round, Sartzetakis, and the current president, received 151 votes with the support of PASOK and Synaspismos, while New Democracy abstained. In the second round, Sartzetakis received 21 votes since PASOK had a new candidate Giannis Alevras, who received 127 votes. In the third round, Sartzetakis received 21 votes again and Giannis Alevras 128 votes. Since no president was elected, new elections on 8 April took place under the Constitution.

Candidate	Party	19 February		25 February		3 March	
Candidate	Party	Votes	%	Votes	%	Votes	%
Christos Sartzetakis	Independent	151	100.00	21	14.19	21	14.09
Giannis Alevras	PASOK	0	0.00	127	85.81	128	85.91
Present but not voted							
Total		151	100.00	148	100.00	149	100.00
Valid votes		151	100.00	148	100.00	149	100.00
Invalid/blank votes		0	0.00	0	0.00	0	0.00
Total votes		151	100.00	148	100.00	149	100.00
Registered voters/turnout		300	50.33	300	49.33	300	49.67

In the second phase, there were three candidates, Karamanlis supported by New Democracy, Alevras from PASOK, and Konstantinos Despotopoulos from Synaspismos. The first round failed to point to a victor. Karamanlis received 153 votes in the second round, two votes above the threshold of 151, becoming president for a second time.

Candidate	Party	30 April		5 May	
Candidate	Party	Votes	%	Votes	%
Konstantinos Karamanlis	New Democracy	149	50.68	153	51.00
Giannis Alevras	PASOK	123	41.84	125	41.67
Konstantinos Despotopoulos	Synaspismos	21	7.14	21	7.00
Present but not voted		1	0.34	1	0.33
Total		294	100.00	300	100.00
Valid votes		294	100.00	300	100.00
Invalid/blank votes		0	0.00	0	0.00
Total votes		294	100.00	300	100.00
Registered voters/turnout		300	98.00	300	100.00

== Sources ==
- "Οι Πρόεδροι της Ελληνικής Δημοκρατίας". sansimera.gr (in Greek). Archived from the original on 2025-02-20.
- Μιχάλης Στούκας (19 January 2025). "Από τον Μιχαήλ Στασινόπουλο στον Κωνσταντίνο Τασούλα - Όλοι οι ένοικοι του Προεδρικού Μεγάρου". Proto Thema (in Greek).
- "Ο Κ. Καραμανλής Πρόεδρος της Δημοκρατίας". Kathimerini (in Greek). 5 May 1990.
