= Ioannis Alevras =

Greek politician and President (1985-1985)

- Ιωάννης Αλευράς
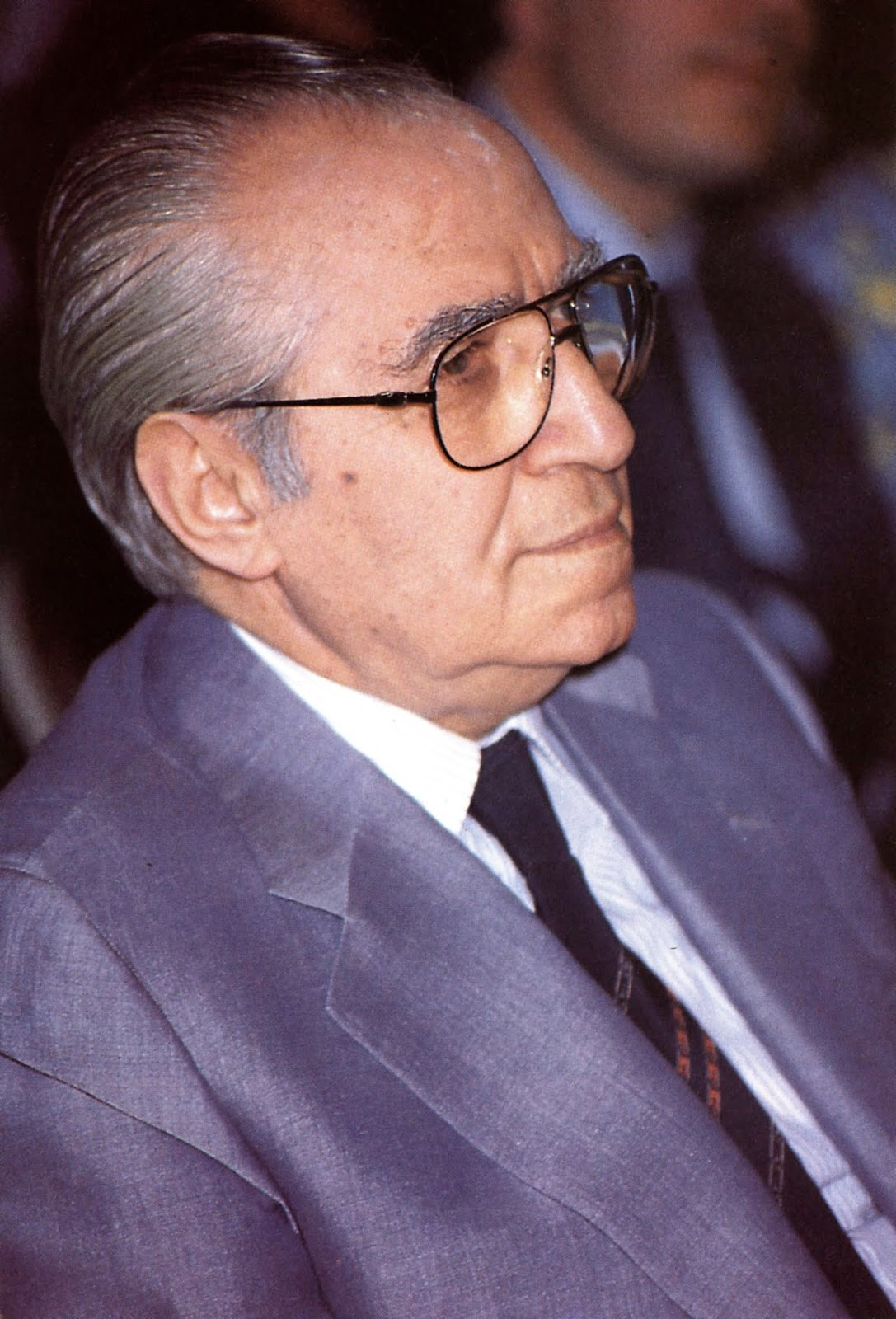
- Alevras in 1985

Acting President of Greece
- In office 10 March 1985 – 30 March 1985
- Prime Minister: Andreas Papandreou
- Preceded by: Konstantinos Karamanlis
- Succeeded by: Christos Sartzetakis

3rd Speaker of the Hellenic Parliament
- In office 17 November 1981 – 3 July 1989
- Preceded by: Dimitrios Papaspyrou
- Succeeded by: Athanasios Tsaldaris

Personal details
- Born: 1912 Messini, Kingdom of Greece
- Died: 6 April 1995 (aged 82–83) Athens, Greece
- Party: Centre Union (Before 1974); Panhellenic Socialist Movement (1974–1995)
- Spouse: Christina Alevra

Ioannis Alevras (Greek: Ιωάννης Αλευράς; 1912 – 6 April 1995), sometimes spelled Yannis Alevras, was a Greek Panhellenic Socialist Movement politician and Speaker of the Hellenic Parliament, who served as acting President of Greece in March 1985.

== Syndicalist ==
Before becoming a politician, Alevras was employed at the Bank of Greece. He was a prominent syndicalist and a key figure in the foundation of OTOE (Federation of Bank Employee Organizations of Greece) in 1955. OTOE united all relevant trade unions along the lines of craft unionism with Alevras at its head for several years.

== Center Union MP ==
Alevras was first elected to Parliament as a candidate of the Center Union in the 1963 Greek legislative election. His party won the elections in a narrow victory (138 seats out of 300, with the National Radical Union having 132) and party leader George Papandreou became Prime Minister of Greece on 8 November 1963.

Because no party had the absolute majority in the Parliament, Papandreou carried out the 1964 Greek legislative election. Alevras successfully sought re-election while his party won the elections with a landslide majority (171 seats out of 300, with the alliance of the National Radical Union and the Progressive Party only having 107 seats).

Alevras defended fellow Center Union MP Andreas Papandreou, son of George, during his trial for the Aspida scandal. The Aspida Group allegedly comprised officers of the Hellenic Army, who belonged to the centre or the left and wanted to assume control of an army dominated at the time by right-wing officers who had fought in the Greek Civil War against the left. The alleged scandal had come to public notice in 1965 and Andreas Papandreou was accused of being a member of this conspiracy.

The Aspida scandal contributed to the Iouliana of 1965 and the fall of the Papandreou government. However, the 1964 Parliament remained in place until the coup d'état of 21 April 1967. During the resulting Greek military junta of 1967-1974, Alevras was imprisoned for resisting the new regime.

== PASOK founding member ==
With the Metapolitefsi, the transitional period from the fall of the dictatorship, Alevras resumed his political career. He joined the Panhellenic Socialist Movement (PASOK), a new Party under Andreas Papandreou, and achieved re-election in 1974 Greek legislative election. He was one of only 12 MPs elected from his Party. PASOK came third in the elections with New Democracy electing 220 MPs and the Center Union - New Forces electing 60.

He was re-elected in the 1977 Greek legislative election. This time PASOK came second with 93 MPs while New Democracy remained in government with 171 seats in Parliament. Continuing the rise of its popularity, PASOK came first in the 1981 Greek legislative election with 171 MPs while New Democracy only elected 115. Andreas Papandreou became Prime Minister while Alevras was elected Speaker of the Greek Parliament.

== Acting President of Greece ==
In 1985, after President Constantine Karamanlis resigned due to the surprised tactics of Papandroeu, Alevras served as acting President, per the relevant provisions of the Constitution of Greece. Part of the constitutional crisis was whether his duties as Speaker should be suspended during his tenure as acting President (10–30 March 1985) and if he was eligible to vote in the election of the new President. The issue became all the more controversial, as Christos Sartzetakis was elected with the minimum number of votes required (180 out of 300) and would have failed to be elected were it not for Alevras' vote. With Sartzetakis as president, Papandreou proposed constitutional amendments to increase the prime minister's powers by removing the president's reserved powers, effectively turning the liberal democracy into a majoritarian "populist democracy".

== Later political career ==
Later that year, PASOK won the 1985 Greek legislative election with 161 MPS while New Democracy elected 126. Papandreou remained Prime Minister and Alevras was elected Speaker for a second time. In the same year, Papandreou was indicted by Parliament in connection with the US$200 million Bank of Crete embezzlement Koskotas scandal. He was accused of helping the embezzlement by ordering state corporations to transfer their holdings to the Bank of Crete where the interest was allegedly skimmed off to benefit PASOK.

The June 1989 Greek legislative election which followed the scandal was inconclusive. New Democracy came first with 145 MPs and PASOK second with only 125, Alevras among them. Neither was enough to form a government by itself. New Democracy formed an alliance with third Party Coalition of the Left and Progress. Their alliance formed a government under Tzannis Tzannetakis.

Synaspismos withdrew its support of the new government only months later. The resulting November 1989 Greek legislative election was again inconclusive. New Democracy came first with 148 MPs and PASOK second with 128, Alevras among them. While each had won 3 more MPs that in the previous election, again none of the two could form a government alone.

The caretaker government under Yiannis Grivas resigned on 23 November 1989. Replaced by a coalition government under Xenophon Zolotas. The new government included representatives of New Democracy, PASOK and Synaspismos and organized the 1990 Greek legislative election. New Democracy came first with 150 MPs and PASOK second with 123, Alevras among them. New Democracy had enough Parliamentary support to form its own government under Party leader Constantine Mitsotakis. Alevras was a presidential candidate against Karamanlis in the spring of 1990.

The Mitsotakis government remained in office for about three years. The heightened public irritation over the Macedonia issue with the neighbouring Republic of Macedonia caused several ND parliament members, led by Antonis Samaras, to withdraw their support from Mitsotakis' government and form a new political party, Political Spring (Politiki Anoiksi). With not enough MPs to remain in office, the New Democracy government organized the 1993 Greek legislative election.

PASOK won the elections with 170 MPs and New Democracy came second with only 111. Andreas Papandreou became Prime Minister again. Alevras was elected MP for the tenth and last time.

He died due to bronchopneumonia at 4 am, on April 6, 1995, following a three-day stay in Hygea Hospital's ICU. He had a state funeral, with honors equivalent to an incumbent prime minister.

Political offices
Preceded by Dimitrios Papaspyrou	Speaker of the Hellenic Parliament; 1981–1989	Succeeded by Athanasios Tsaldaris
Preceded by Konstantinos Karamanlis	President of Greece; Acting; 1985	Succeeded by Christos Sartzetakis
