= Dimitrios Makris (politician) =

Greek politician (1910–1981)

Dimitrios "Takos" Makris (Greek: Δημήτριος "Τάκος" Μακρής, 1910 – 10 March 1981) was a Greek conservative politician and close associate of Prime Minister Constantine Karamanlis.

== Life ==
Dimitrios Makris was an Aromanian. He was born in Florina, which was at the time part of the Ottoman Empire, in 1910. After graduating in Law from Athens University, he worked as a lawyer in Thessaloniki.

He served as a Member of Parliament representing Florina Prefecture from 1956 to 1967, and from 1974 to 1977. He served as Interior Minister from 1956 to 1961, and as Minister for the Presidency of the Government from 1961 to 1963.

In 1960 he was accused of being a Nazi collaborator during World War II (the so-called "Merten affair"), which he denied, but from that point onward he was constantly under attack by the press.

He died in London in 1981, aged 71.
