= Konstantinos Karamanlis =

Greek politician (1907–1998)

- Κωνσταντίνος Καραμανλής
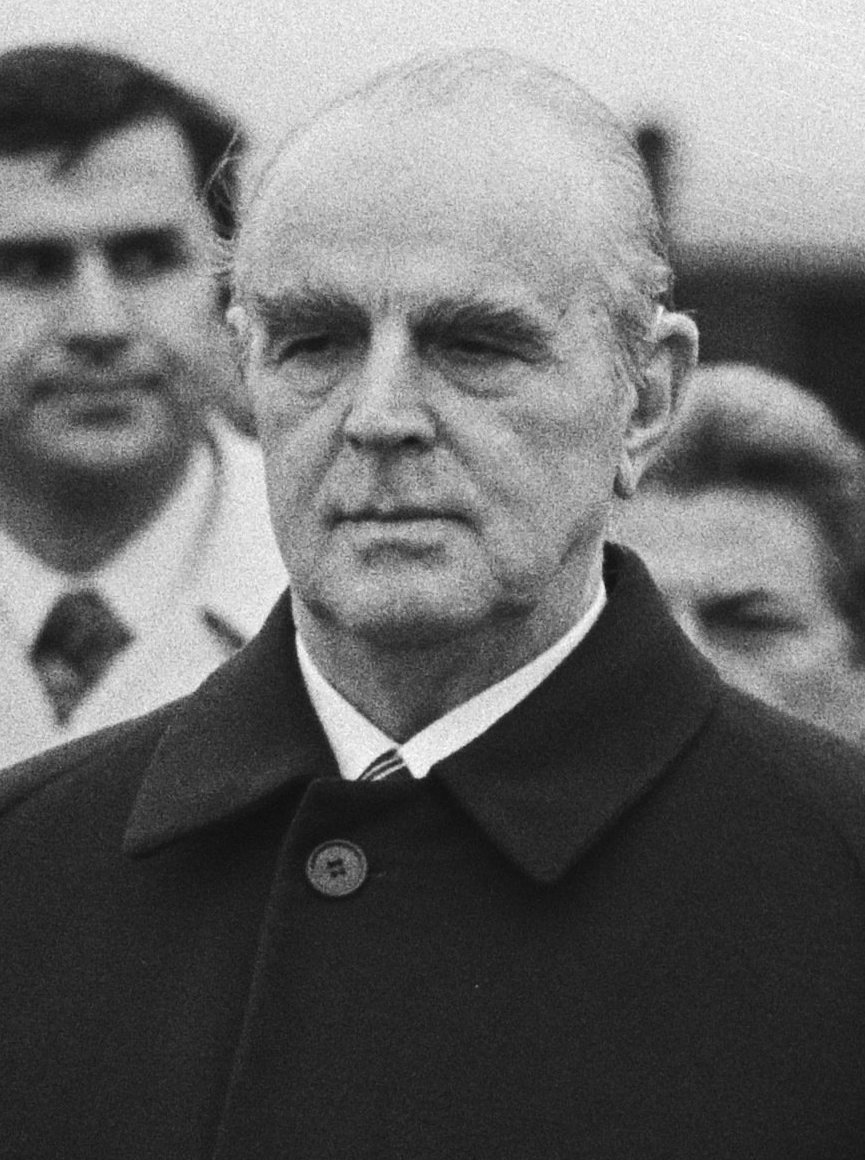
- Karamanlis in 1978

President of Greece
- In office 5 May 1990 – 10 March 1995
- Prime Minister: Konstantinos Mitsotakis; Andreas Papandreou
- Preceded by: Christos Sartzetakis
- Succeeded by: Konstantinos Stephanopoulos
- In office 10 May 1980 – 10 March 1985
- Prime Minister: Georgios Rallis; Andreas Papandreou
- Preceded by: Konstantinos Tsatsos
- Succeeded by: Ioannis Alevras (Acting); Christos Sartzetakis

Prime Minister of Greece
- In office 24 July 1974 – 10 May 1980
- President: Phaedon Gizikis; Michail Stasinopoulos; Konstantinos Tsatsos
- Deputy: Georgios Mavros
- Preceded by: Adamantios Androutsopoulos
- Succeeded by: Georgios Rallis
- In office 4 November 1961 – 17 June 1963
- Monarch: Paul
- Preceded by: Konstantinos Dovas
- Succeeded by: Panagiotis Pipinelis
- In office 17 May 1958 – 20 September 1961
- Monarch: Paul
- Preceded by: Konstantinos Georgakopoulos
- Succeeded by: Konstantinos Dovas
- In office 6 October 1955 – 5 March 1958
- Monarch: Paul
- Preceded by: Alexandros Papagos
- Succeeded by: Konstantinos Georgakopoulos

President of New Democracy
- In office 4 October 1974 – 8 May 1980
- Preceded by: Party founded
- Succeeded by: Georgios Rallis

Personal details
- Born: 8 March 1907 Küpköy, Salonica Vilayet, Ottoman Empire
- Died: 23 April 1998 (aged 91) Ygeia Hospital, Marousi, Greece
- Resting place: Konstantinos Karamanlis Foundation Headquarters, Philothei, Athens
- Party: People's Party (1936–1951); Greek Rally (1951–1955); National Radical Union (1955–1963); New Democracy (1974–1998)
- Spouse: Amalia Kanellopoulou (m. 1951; div. 1972)
- Relations: Kostas Karamanlis (nephew); Kostas Karamanlis (nephew)
- Education: University of Athens
- Website: Konstantinos Karamanlis Foundation

Konstantinos G. Karamanlis (Greek: Κωνσταντίνος Γ. Καραμανλής, pronounced [konstaˈdinos karamanˈlis]; 8 March 1907 – 23 April 1998) was a Greek statesman who was the four-time Prime Minister of Greece and two-term president of the Third Hellenic Republic, serving in the former role from 1955 to 1963 and from 1974 to 1980. A towering figure of Greek politics, his political career spanned portions of seven decades, covering much of the latter half of the 20th century.

Born near Serres in Macedonia, Karamanlis practiced law until his election to the Hellenic Parliament in 1936 as a member of the conservative People's Party. Rising through the ranks of Greek politics after World War II, Karamanlis became Minister of Labour in 1947, and in 1952 he was named Minister for Public Works in Alexandros Papagos's Greek Rally administration. He was appointed prime minister by King Paul of Greece after Papagos's death in 1955. During his first term, he applied a program of rapid industrialization, heavy investment on infrastructure and improvement on agricultural production, which led to the post-war Greek economic miracle. He also implemented the extension of full voting rights to women, which had stood dormant since 1952. In foreign affairs, he pursued an aggressive policy toward Greek membership in the European Economic Community (EEC), and abandoned the government's previous strategic goal for enosis (the unification of Greece and Cyprus) in favour of Cypriot independence. Re-elected three times, electoral victories in 1956 and 1961 were marred by controversy and political division.

In 1963, Karamanlis resigned following a disagreement with King Paul amidst spiralling political crises in Greece. He spent the next eleven years in self-imposed exile in Paris, resigning from the leadership of the National Radical Union after defeat in the 1963 elections, while the country fell under military dictatorship after the 1967 coup d'état. After the fall of the junta in 1974, Karamanlis was recalled to Athens to assume interim premiership. This period, known as the Metapolitefsi, saw the country's transition to a pluralist democracy, which resulted in the decriminalisation of the Communist Party. His new party, New Democracy, won a commanding victory in the November 1974 elections, which were followed by a plebiscite that abolished the monarchy and established the Third Hellenic Republic.

In 1980, Karamanlis resigned as prime minister and was elected President of the Republic. In 1981, he oversaw Greece's formal entry into the European Economic Community. He resigned from the presidency in 1985 but was again elected in 1990, and served until his retirement from active politics in 1995. Karamanlis died in 1998 at the age of 91.

== Early life ==
Karamanlis was born in the village of Proti, near the city of Serres, Macedonia, which was then part of the Ottoman Empire. He became a Greek citizen in 1913, after the region of Macedonia was annexed by Greece in the aftermath of the First and Second Balkan War. His father was Georgios Karamanlis, a teacher who fought during the Greek Struggle for Macedonia, in 1904–1908. After spending his childhood in Macedonia, he went to Athens to attain his degree in law. He practised law in Serres, entered politics with the conservative People's Party, and was elected Member of Parliament for the first time in the 1936 election at the age of 28. Health problems prevented him from participating in the Greco-Italian War.

During the Axis occupation, he spent his time between Athens and Serres, while in July 1944, he left to the Middle East to join the Greek government in exile.

== First premiership ==
After World War II, Karamanlis quickly rose through the ranks of Greek politics. His rise was strongly supported by fellow party-member and close friend Lambros Eftaxias, who served as Minister for Agriculture under the premiership of Konstantinos Tsaldaris. Karamanlis's first cabinet position was Minister for Labour in 1947 under the same administration. In 1951, along with most prominent members of the People's Party, Karamanlis joined the Greek Rally of Alexandros Papagos. When this party won the Greek parliamentary election on 16 November 1952, Karamanlis became Minister of Public Works in the Papagos administration. He won the admiration of the US Embassy for the efficiency with which he built road infrastructure and administered American aid programs. When Papagos died after a brief illness (October 1955), King Paul of Greece appointed the 48-year-old Karamanlis as prime minister. The King's appointment took the Greek political world by surprise, as it bypassed Stephanos Stephanopoulos and Panagiotis Kanellopoulos, two senior Greek Rally politicians who were widely considered as the heavyweights most likely to succeed Papagos. After becoming prime minister, Karamanlis reorganized the Greek Rally as the National Radical Union. One of the first bills he promoted as prime minister implemented the extension of full voting rights to women, which stood dormant although nominally approved in 1952. Karamanlis won three successive elections (February 1956, May 1958 and October 1961).

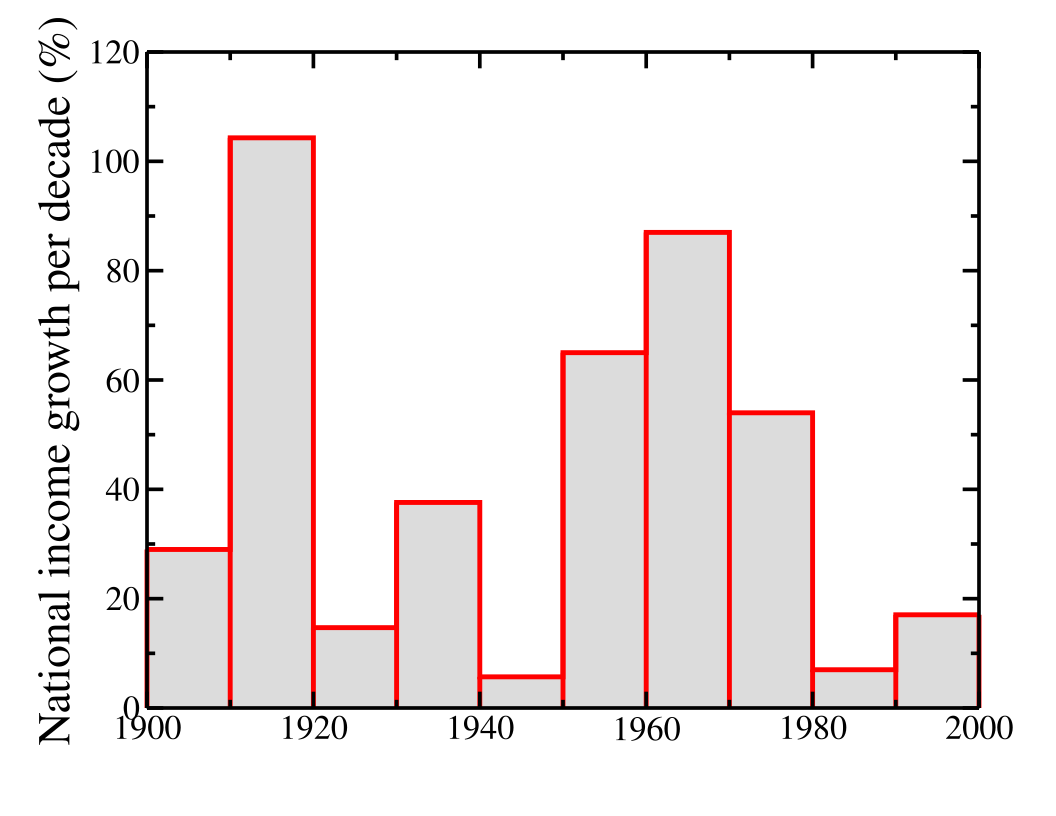
Greek National Income per decade for 1900–2000. During Karamanlis's tenure, the national income increased significantly. Source: The Bank of Greece and National Statistical Service, various open source bulletins and reports.

In 1959 he announced a five-year plan (1959–64) for the Greek economy, emphasizing improvement of agricultural and industrial production, heavy investment on infrastructure and the promotion of tourism, setting the bases of the post-WWII Greek economic miracle, though implementation was disrupted by the 1967 Coup d'état and the 7 years of dictatorship that followed.

=== London-Zürich Agreements ===
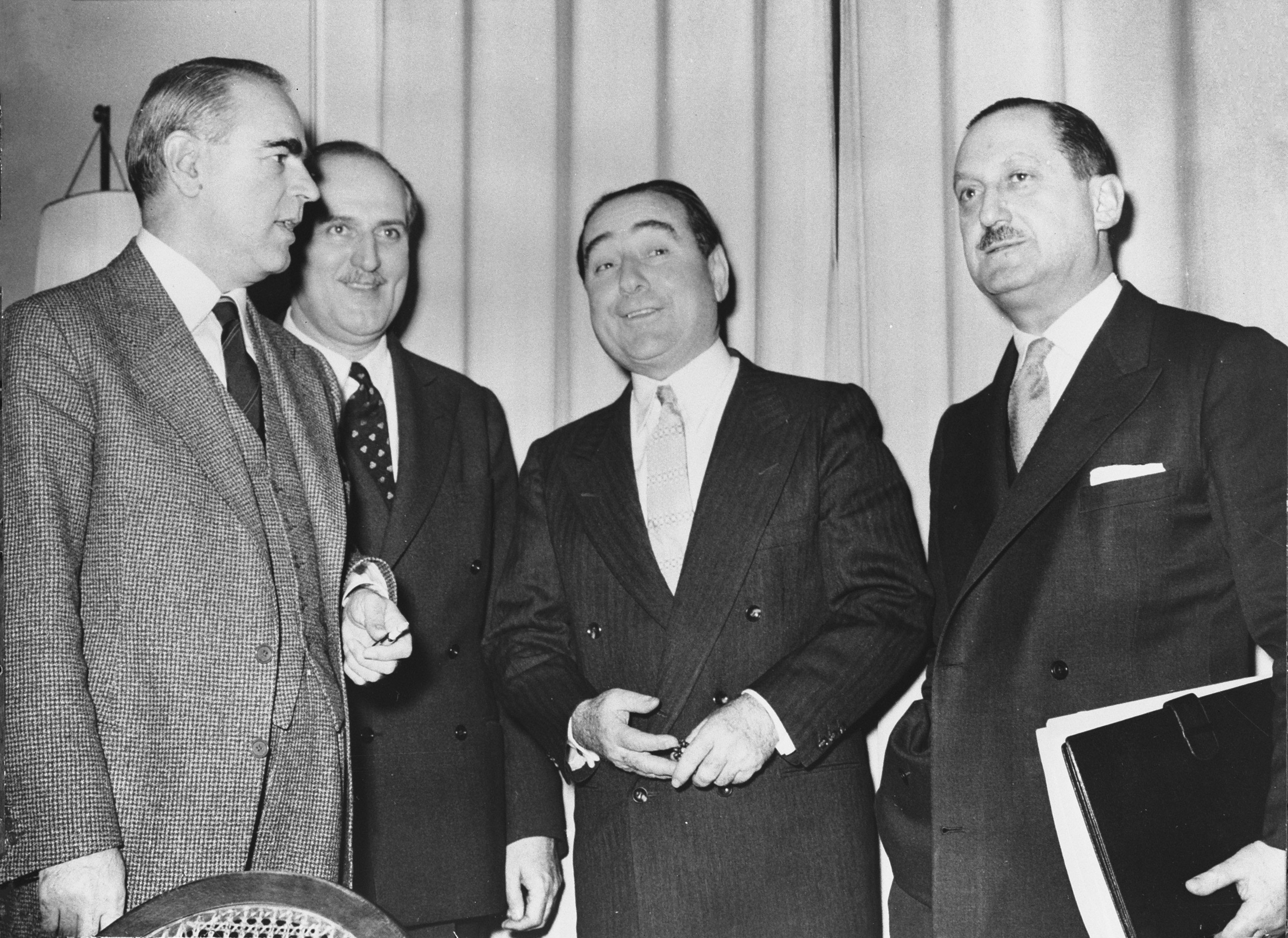
Karamanlis with Averoff and Turkish PM Menderes (centre) during conversations in Zurich

On the international front, Karamanlis abandoned the government's previous strategic goal for enosis (the unification of Greece and Cyprus) in favour of independence for Cyprus. In 1958, his government engaged in negotiations with the United Kingdom and Turkey, which culminated in the Zurich Agreement as a basis for a deal on the independence of Cyprus. In February 1959 the plan was ratified in London by the Cypriot leader Makarios III.

=== Merten affair ===
Max Merten was Kriegsverwaltungsrat (military administration counselor) of the Nazi German occupation forces in Thessaloniki. He was convicted in Greece and sentenced to a 25-year term as a war criminal in 1959. On 3 November of that year, Merten benefited from an amnesty for war criminals, and was set free and extradited to the Federal Republic of Germany, after political and economic pressure from West Germany (which, at the time, hosted thousands of Greek Gastarbeiter). Merten's arrest also enraged Queen Frederica, a woman with German ties, who wondered whether "this is the way mister district attorney understands the development of German and Greek relations".

In Germany, Merten was eventually acquitted from all charges due to "lack of evidence." On 28 September 1960 German newspapers Hamburger Echo and Der Spiegel published excerpts of Merten's deposition to the German authorities where Merten claimed that Karamanlis, the then Minister for the Interior, Takos Makris and his wife, Doxoula (whom he described as Karamanlis's niece) along with then Deputy Minister of Defense Georgios Themelis were informers in Thessaloniki during the Nazi occupation of Greece. Merten alleged that Karamanlis and Makris were rewarded for their services with a business in Thessaloniki which belonged to a Greek Jew sent to the Auschwitz concentration camp. He also alleged that he had pressured Karamanlis and Makris to grant amnesty and release him from prison.

Karamanlis rejected the claims as unsubstantiated and absurd, and accused Merten of attempting to extort money from him prior to making the statements. The West German government (Third Adenauer cabinet) also decried the accusations as calumniatory and libelous. Karamanlis accused the opposition party of instigating a smear campaign against him. Although Karamanlis never pressed charges against Merten, charges were pressed in Greece against Der Spiegel by Takos and Doxoula Makris and Themelis, and the magazine was found guilty of slander in 1963. Merten did not appear to testify during the Greek court proceedings. The Merten Affair remained at the centre of political discussions until early 1961.

Merten's accusations against Karamanlis were never corroborated in a court of law. Historian Giannis Katris, an ardent critic of Karamanlis, argued in 1971 that Karamanlis should have resigned the premiership and pressed charges against Merten as a private individual in German courts, in order to fully clear his name. Nonetheless, Katris rejects the accusations as "unsubstantiated" and "obviously fallacious".

=== European vision ===
Konstantinos Karamanlis, his cabinet with Deputy Prime Minister Panagiotis Kanellopoulos (front left) and German Vice-Chancellor Ludwig Erhard with a German/European delegation during a visit by Erhard to sign the protocols of Greece's Treaty of Association with the European Economic Community (EEC) in 1961. Paul-Henri Spaak is second from the right (front row).

Karamanlis as early as 1958 pursued an aggressive policy toward Greek membership in the EEC. He considered Greece's entry into the EEC a personal dream because he saw it as the fulfillment of what he called "Greece's European Destiny". He personally lobbied European leaders, such as Germany's Konrad Adenauer and France's Charles de Gaulle followed by two years of intense negotiations with Brussels. His intense lobbying bore fruit and on 9 July 1961 his government and the Europeans signed the protocols of Greece's Treaty of Association with the European Economic Community (EEC). The signing ceremony in Athens was attended by top government delegations from the six-member bloc of Germany, France, Italy, Belgium, Luxemburg and the Netherlands, a precursor of the European Union. Economy Minister Aristidis Protopapadakis and Foreign Minister Evangelos Averoff were also present. German Vice-Chancellor Ludwig Erhard and Belgian Foreign Minister Paul-Henri Spaak, a European Union pioneer and a Karlspreis winner like Karamanlis, were among the European delegates.

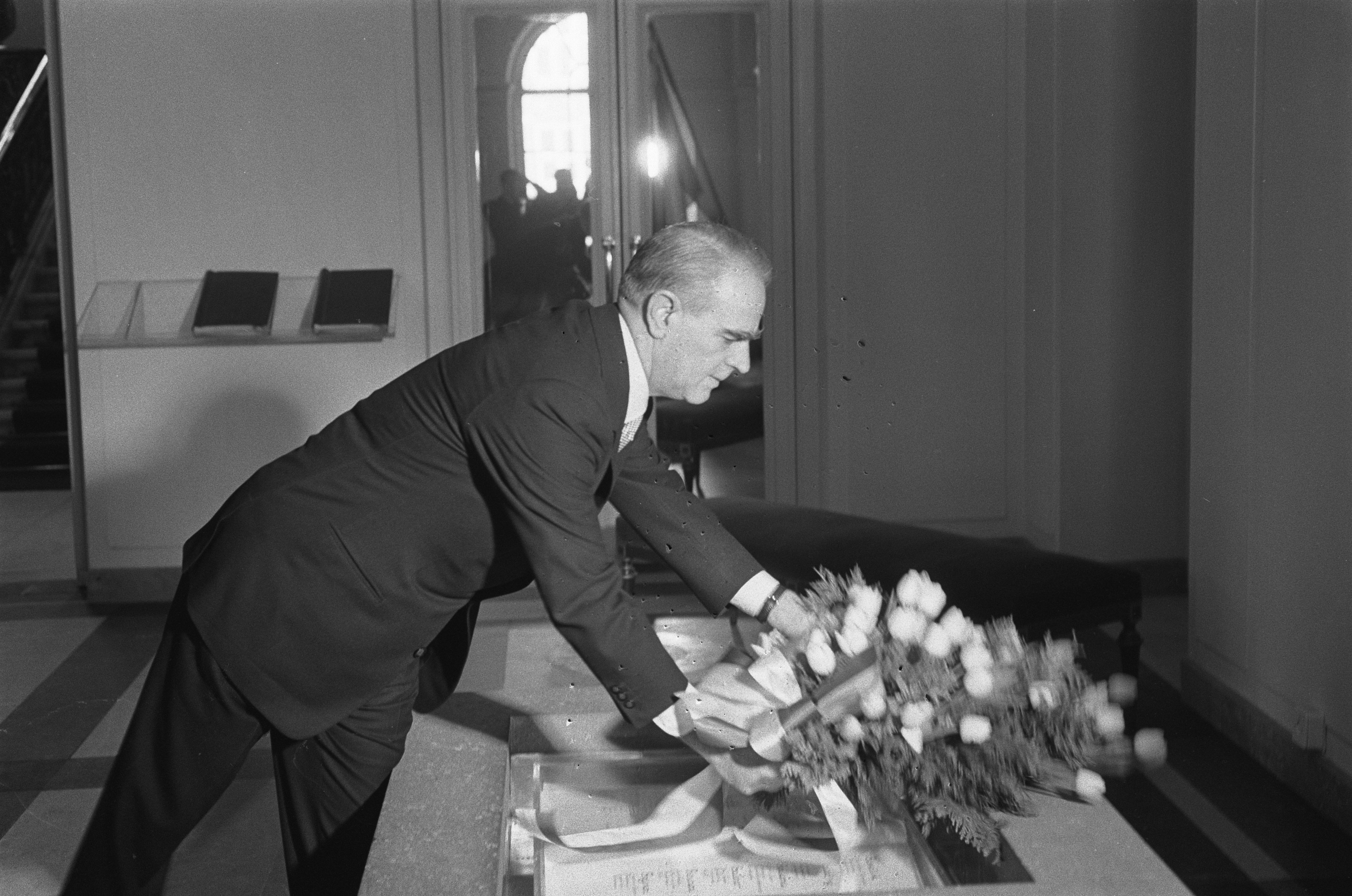
During a visit to the Netherlands, 1963

This had the profound effect of ending Greece's economic isolation and breaking its political and economic dependence on US economic and military aid, mainly through NATO. Greece became the first European country to acquire the status of associate member of the EEC outside the six nation EEC group. In November 1962 the association treaty came into effect and envisaged the country's full membership at the EEC by 1984, after the gradual elimination of all Greek tariffs on EEC imports. A financial protocol clause included in the treaty provided for loans to Greece subsidised by the community of about $300 million between 1962 and 1972 to help increase the competitiveness of the Greek economy in anticipation of Greece's full membership. The Community's financial aid package as well as the protocol of accession were suspended during the 1967–74 junta years and Greece was expelled from the EEC. As well, during the dictatorship, Greece resigned its membership in the Council of Europe fearing embarrassing investigations by the Council, following torture allegations.

Soon after returning to Greece during metapolitefsi Karamanlis reactivated his push for the country's full EEC membership in 1975 citing political and economic reasons. Karamanlis was convinced that Greece's membership in the EEC would ensure political stability in a nation having just undergone a transition from dictatorship to Democracy.

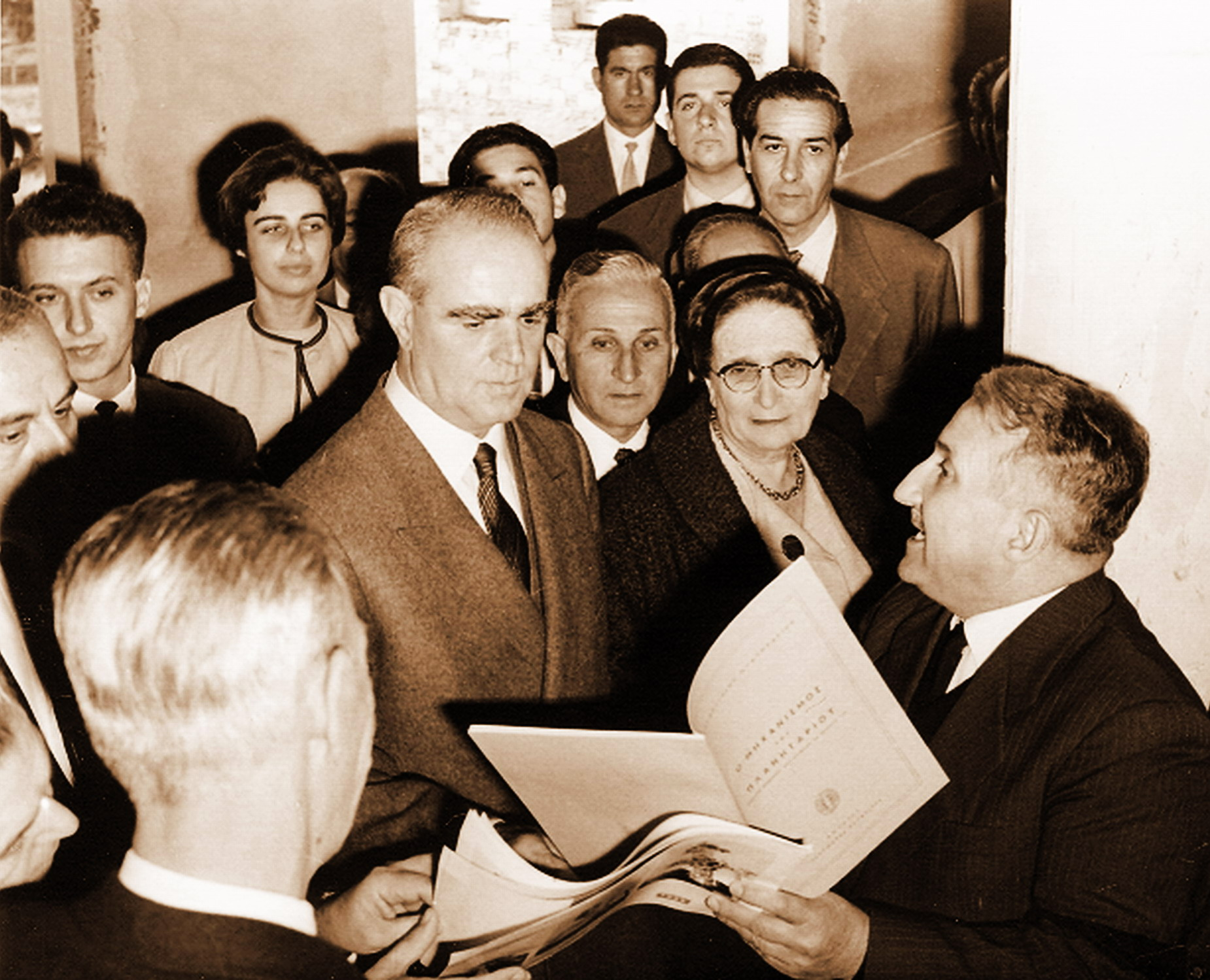
Karamanlis inspects the plans for the building of the Eugenides Planetarium (1962)

In May 1979 he signed the full treaty of accession. Greece became the tenth member of the EEC on 1 January 1981 three years earlier than the original protocol envisioned and despite the freezing of the treaty of accession during the junta (1967–1974).

== Crises and self-exile ==
In the 1961 elections, the National Radical Union won 50.8 percent of the popular vote and 176 seats. The elections were denounced by both main opposition parties, EDA and the Centre Union, who refused to recognise the result based on numerous cases of voter intimidation and irregularities, such as sudden massive increases in support for ERE against historical patterns, or the voting by deceased persons. The Centre Union alleged that the election result had been staged by the shadowy "para-state" (παρακράτος) agents, including the army leadership, the Greek Central Intelligence Service, and the notoriously right-wing National Guard Defence Battalions, according to a prepared emergency plan code-named Pericles. Although irregularities certainly occurred, the existence of Pericles was never proven, nor is it certain that the interference in the elections radically influenced the outcome. Nevertheless, Centre Union leader George Papandreou initiated an "unrelenting struggle" ("ανένδοτος αγών") until new and fair elections were held.

=== Lambrakis assassination ===
Karamanlis's position was further undermined, and Papandreou's claims of an independently acting "para-state" given more credence, following the assassination of Grigoris Lambrakis, a leftist member of Parliament, by right-wing extremists during a pro-peace demonstration in Thessaloniki in May 1963, who were later revealed to have close links to the local gendarmerie. Karamanlis was shocked by the assassination, was heavily criticized by the opposition of Georgios Papandreou, and he stated:

Who governs this country?

The final straw for Karamanlis's government was his clash with the Palace in summer 1963, over the projected visit of the royal pair to Britain. Karamanlis opposed the trip, as he feared that it would provide the occasion for demonstrations against the political prisoners still held in Greece since the Civil War. Karamanlis's relations with the Palace had been declining for some time, particularly with Queen Frederika and the Crown Prince, but the Prime Minister also clashed with King Paul over the latter's opposition to proposed constitutional amendments that would empower the government, the extravagant lifestyle of the royal family, and the near-monopoly that the King claimed over control of the armed forces. When the King rejected his advice to postpone the trip to London, Karamanlis resigned and left the country. In his absence, ERE was led by a committee composed of Panagiotis Kanellopoulos, Konstantinos Rodopoulos and Panagis Papaligouras.

In the 1963 election, the National Radical Union, under his leadership, was defeated by the Centre Union under George Papandreou. Disappointed with the result, Karamanlis fled Greece under the name Triantafyllides. He spent the next 11 years in self-imposed exile in Paris, France. Karamanlis was succeeded by Panagiotis Kanellopoulos as the ERE leader.

In 1966, Constantine II of Greece sent his envoy Demetrios Bitsios to Paris on a mission to convince Karamanlis to return to Greece and resume a role in Greek politics. According to uncorroborated claims that were made by the former monarch only after both men had died, in 2006, Karamanlis replied to Bitsios that he would return under the condition that the King were to impose martial law, as was his constitutional prerogative.

U.S. journalist Cyrus L. Sulzberger has separately claimed that Karamanlis flew to New York to visit Lauris Norstad and lobby US support for a coup d'état in Greece that would establish a strong conservative regime under himself; Sulzberger alleges that Norstad declined to involve himself in such affairs.

Sulzberger's account, which unlike that of the former King was delivered during the lifetime of those implicated (Karamanlis and Norstad), rested solely on the authority of his and Norstad's word.

When in 1997, the former King reiterated Sulzberger's allegations, Karamanlis stated that he "will not deal with the former king's statements because both their content and attitude are unworthy of comment." The deposed King's adoption of Sulzberger's claims against Karamanlis was castigated by left-leaning media, typically critical of Karamanlis, as "shameless" and "brazen". It bears noting that, at the time, the former King referred exclusively to Sulzberger's account, to support the theory of a planned coup by Karamanlis, and made no mention of the alleged 1966 meeting with Bitsios, which he would refer to only after both participants had died and could not respond.

On 21 April 1967, constitutional order was usurped by a coup d'état led by officers around Colonel George Papadopoulos. The King accepted to swear in the military-appointed government as the legitimate government of Greece, but launched an abortive counter-coup to overthrow the junta eight months later. Constantine and his family then fled the country.

== Stasi smear campaign ==
In 2001, former agents of the Eastern German secret police, the Stasi, claimed to Greek investigative reporters that during the Cold War, they had orchestrated an operation of evidence falsification, to present Karamanlis as having planned a coup and thus damage his reputation in an apparent disinformation propaganda campaign. The operation allegedly centered on a falsified conversation between Karamanlis and Strauss, a Bavarian officer of the King.

== Second premiership ==
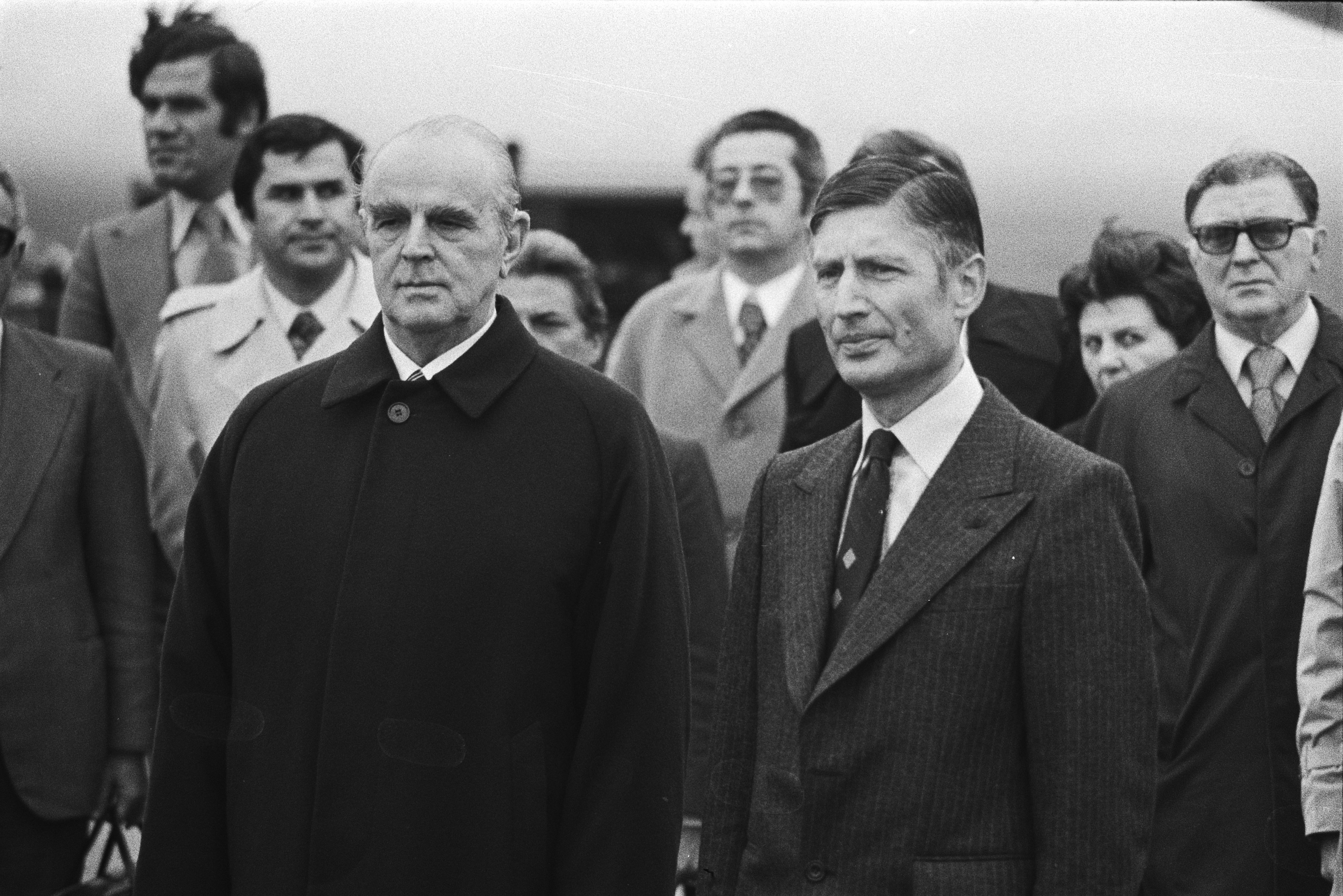
Karamanlis with Dries van Agt in 1978

=== Metapolitefsi (restoration of democracy) ===
In 1974, the invasion of Cyprus by the Turks led to the collapse of the military junta. On 23 July 1974, President Phaedon Gizikis called a meeting of old guard politicians, including Panagiotis Kanellopoulos, Spyros Markezinis, Stefanos Stefanopoulos, Evangelos Averoff and others. The heads of the armed forces also participated in the meeting. The agenda was to appoint a national unity government that would lead the country to elections.

Former prime minister Panagiotis Kanellopoulos was originally suggested as the head of the new interim government. He was the interim prime minister originally deposed by the dictatorship in 1967 and a distinguished politician who had repeatedly criticized Papadopoulos and his successor. Raging battles were still taking place in Cyprus's north when Greeks took to the streets in all the major cities, celebrating the junta's decision to relinquish power before the war in Cyprus could spill all over the Aegean. But talks in Athens were going nowhere with Gizikis's offer to Panagiotis Kanellopoulos to form a government.

Nonetheless, after all the other politicians departed without reaching a decision, Evangelos Averoff remained in the meeting room and further engaged Gizikis. He insisted that Karamanlis was the only political personality who could lead a successful transition government, taking into consideration the new circumstances and dangers both inside and outside the country. Gizikis and the heads of the armed forces initially expressed reservations, but they finally became convinced by Averoff's arguments. Admiral Arapakis was the first, among the participating military leaders, to express his support for Karamanlis.

After Averoff's decisive intervention, Gizikis decided to invite Karamanlis to assume the premiership. Throughout his stay in France, Karamanlis was a vocal opponent of the Regime of the Colonels, the military junta that seized power in Greece in April 1967. He was now called to end his self-imposed exile and restore democracy to the place where it was originally invented. Upon news of his impending arrival cheering Athenian crowds took to the streets chanting: Έρχεται! Έρχεται! He is coming! He is coming! Similar celebrations broke out all over Greece. Athenians in their thousands also went to the airport to greet him. Karamanlis was sworn in as prime minister under President pro tempore Phaedon Gizikis who remained in power in the interim, till December 1974, for legal continuity reasons until a new constitution could be enacted during metapolitefsi and was subsequently replaced by duly elected President Michail Stasinopoulos.

During the inherently unstable first weeks of the metapolitefsi, Karamanlis was forced to sleep aboard a yacht watched over by a destroyer for fear of a new coup. Karamanlis attempted to defuse the tension between Greece and Turkey, which were on the brink of war over the Cyprus crisis, through the diplomatic route. Two successive conferences in Geneva, where the Greek government was represented by George Mavros, failed to avert a full-scale invasion by Turkey on 14 August 1974 or the subsequent Turkish occupation of 37 percent of Cyprus. As a protest, Karamanlis led the country outside of the military branch of NATO and remained out until 1980.

The steadfast process of transition from military rule to a pluralist democracy proved successful. During this transition period of the metapolitefsi, Karamanlis legalized the Communist Party of Greece (KKE) that was banned since the Greek Civil War. The legalization of the communist party was considered by many as a gesture of political inclusionism and rapprochement. At the same time he also freed all political prisoners and pardoned all political crimes against the junta. Following through with his reconciliation theme he also adopted a measured approach to removing collaborators and appointees of the dictatorship from the positions they held in government bureaucracy, and declared that free elections would be held in November 1974, four months after the collapse of the Regime of the Colonels.

=== Greek republic referendum ===
Influenced by Gaullist principles, Karamanlis founded the conservative party of New Democracy and in the 1974 elections achieved a record 54.4% victory (the greatest electoral victory in modern Greek history), obtained a massive parliamentary majority and he was elected prime minister.

The elections were soon followed by the 1974 plebiscite on the abolition of the monarchy and the establishment of a Hellenic Republic, the televised 1975 trials (Greek Junta Trials) of the former dictators (who received death sentences for high treason and mutiny that were later commuted to life incarceration) and the writing of the new Constitution.

In 1977, New Democracy again won the elections, and Karamanlis continued to serve as prime minister until 1980. The external policy of his governments, for the first time since the war, favoured a multi-polar approach between US, Soviet Union and the Third World; a policy continued also by his successor Andreas Papandreou.

Under Karamanlis's premiership, his government also undertook numerous nationalizations in several sectors, including banking and transportation. Karamanlis's policies of economic statism, which fostered a large state-run sector, have been described by many as socialmania.

== First and second Presidency ==
=== Accession of Greece to the European Communities ===
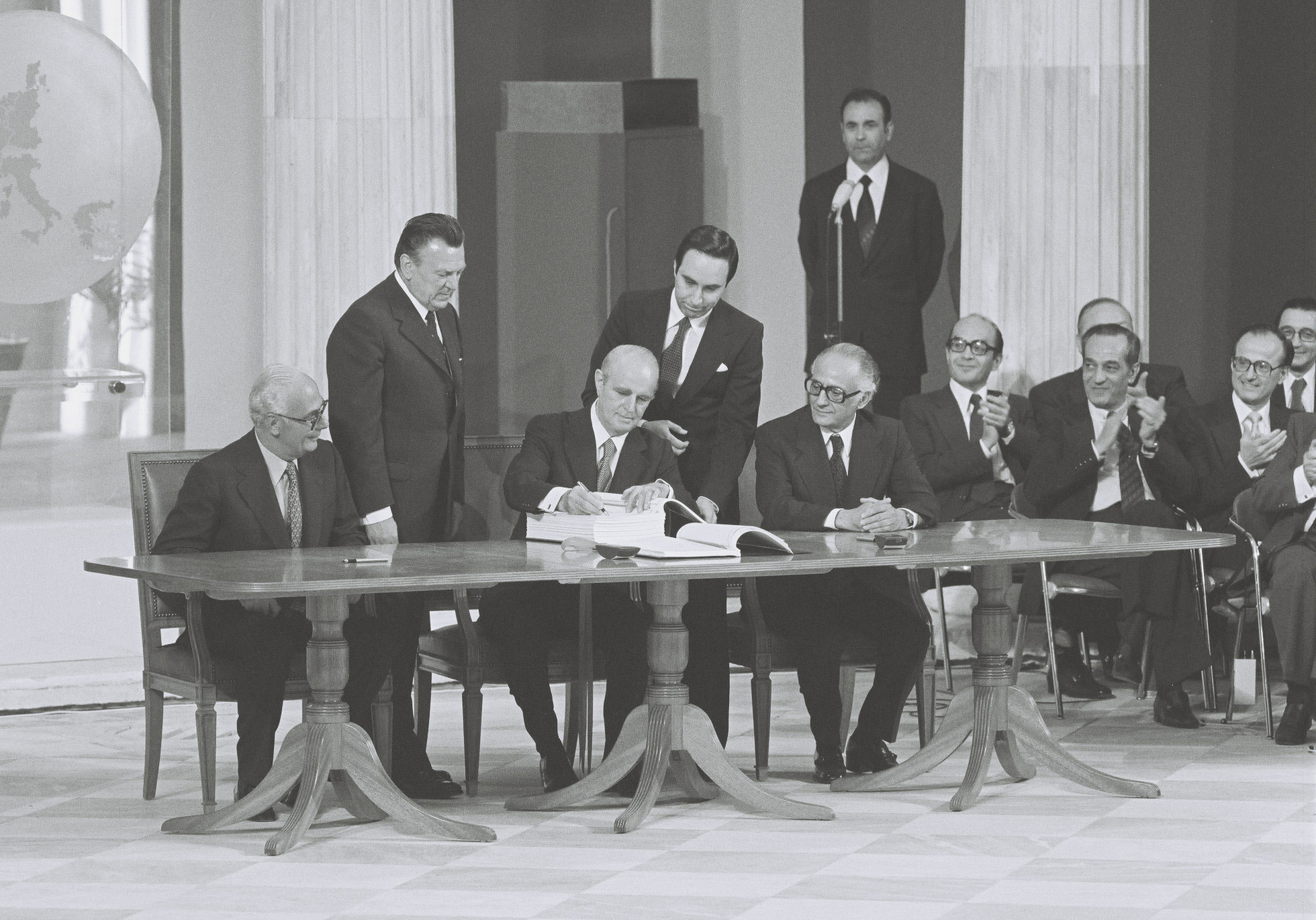
Signing at Zappeion of the documents for the accession of Greece to the European Communities in 1979.

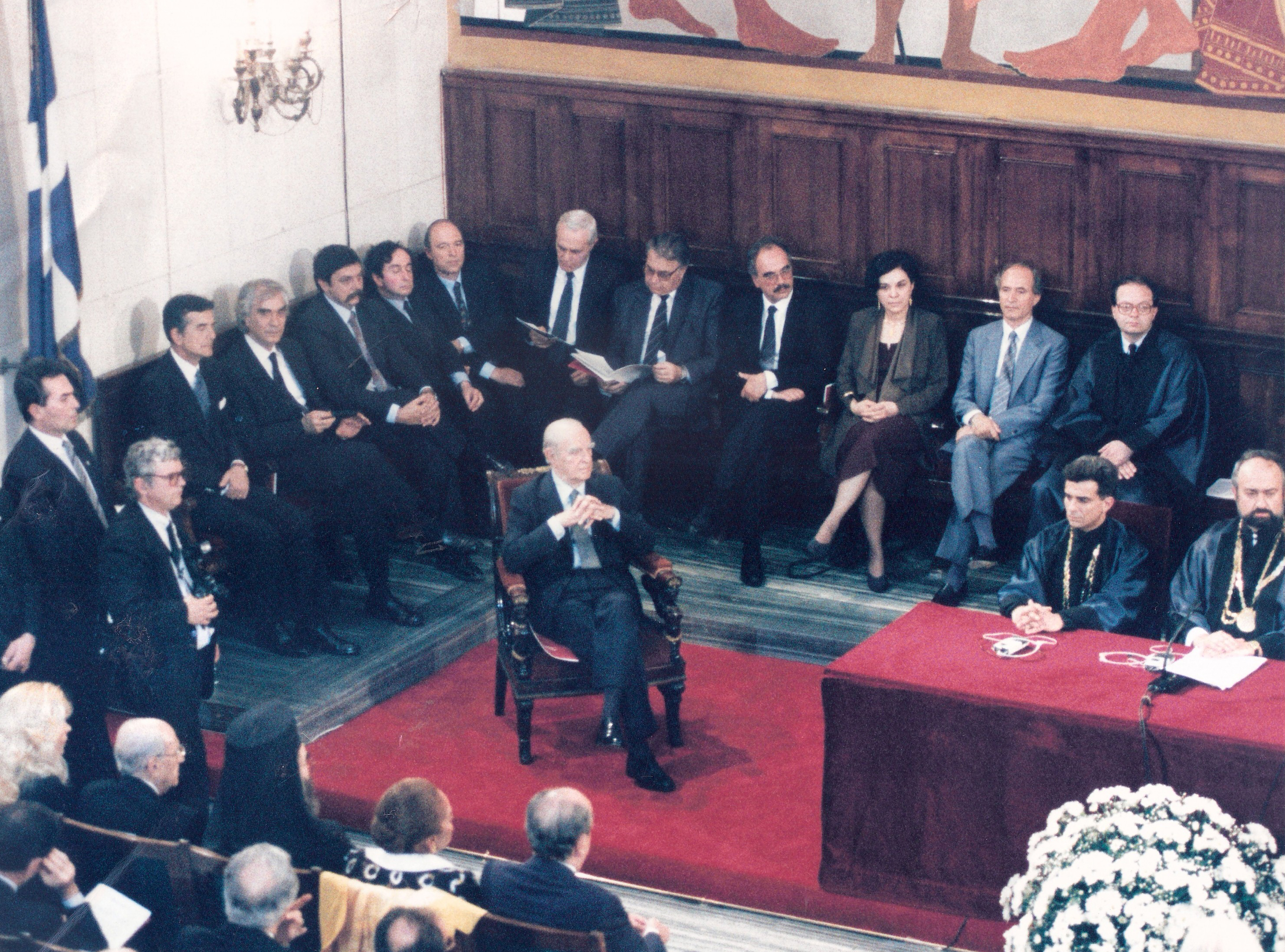
Old Karamanlis in Panteion University

Following his signing of the Accession Treaty with the European Economic Community (now the European Union) in 1979, Karamanlis relinquished the Premiership and was elected President of the Republic in 1980 by the Parliament, and in 1981 he oversaw Greece's formal entry into the European Economic Community as its tenth member. He served until 1985, then resigned and was succeeded by Christos Sartzetakis by the dubious processes of Andreas Papandreou, which caused a constitutional crisis. His phrase became famous during the 1989 political crisis to characterize the state of affairs at the end of the second term of Papandreou: "Hellas has been transformed to an endless bedlam."

In 1990, he was re-elected President by a conservative parliamentary majority (under the conservative government of then Prime Minister Konstantinos Mitsotakis) and served until 1995, when he was succeeded by Kostis Stephanopoulos.

== Later life ==
Karamanlis retired in 1995, at the age of 88, having won 5 parliamentary elections, and having spent 14 years as prime minister, 10 years as President of the Republic, and a total of more than sixty years in active politics. For his long service to democracy and as a pioneer of European integration from the earliest stages of the European Union, Karamanlis was awarded one of the most prestigious European prizes, the Karlspreis, in 1978. He bequeathed his archives to the Konstantinos Karamanlis Foundation, a conservative think tank he had founded and endowed.

Karamanlis died after a short illness in 1998, at the age of 91. He was buried on the grounds of the Foundation, as he had requested.

Karamanlis married Amalia Kanellopoulou (later Megapanou, 1929–2020) in 1951, the niece of Panagiotis Kanellopoulos, a prominent politician. They divorced in 1972 in Paris, without ever having children. Karamanlis remained childless all his life.

== Legacy ==
Karamanlis has been praised for presiding over an early period of fast economic growth for Greece (1955–63) and for being the primary engineer of Greece's successful bid for membership in the European Union.

His supporters lauded him as the charismatic Ethnarches (National Leader). Some of his left-wing opponents have accused him of condoning rightist "para-statal" groups, whose members undertook Via kai Notheia (Violence and Corruption), i.e., fraud during the electoral contests between ERE and Papandreou's Center Union party, and were responsible for the assassination of Gregoris Lambrakis. Some of Karamanlis's conservative opponents have criticized his socialist economic policies during the 1970s, which included the nationalization of Olympic Airways and Emporiki Bank and the creation of a large public sector. Karamanlis has also been criticized by Ange S. Vlachos for indecisiveness in his management of the Cyprus crisis in 1974 even though it is widely acknowledged that he skillfully avoided an all-out war with Turkey during that time.

Karamanlis is recognised for his successful restoration of Democracy during metapolitefsi and the repair of the two great national schisms by legalising the communist party and by establishing the system of parliamentary democracy in Greece. His successful prosecution of the junta during the junta trials and the heavy sentences imposed on the junta principals also sent a message to the army that the era of immunity from constitutional transgressions by the military was over. Karamanlis's policy of European integration is also acknowledged to have ended the paternalistic relation between Greece and the United States.

His nephew Kostas Karamanlis later became the leader of the New Democracy party (Nea Demokratia) and Prime Minister of Greece from 2004 to 2009. Another nephew, also named Kostas Karamanlis, served as Minister of Infrastructure and Transport from 2019 to 2023.

== Controversies ==
Karamanlis has been heavily criticised for his stance on the Cyprus problem since the late 1950s where he forced Makarios III to sign the Zürich and London Agreements, threatening to withdraw Greek political support for the Greek Cypriots if he didn't. In the summer of 1974, during the Turkish invasion of Cyprus and the Metapolitefsi, Karamanlis refused point blank to send help to Cyprus when asked by the acting President of Cyprus Glafcos Clerides infamously stating in the conversation "Η Κύπρος κείται μακράν" ("Cyprus lies far away") for military aid. The only military aid Cyprus received from Greece was in the last days of the Junta regime, where Greek commandos from A' Raider Squadron under the codename Operation Niki which also stood to disprove the claim that Cyprus was too far. Karamanlis not only refused to prosecute the armed forces chiefs who refused to go to Cyprus's aid when Dimitrios Ioannidis had ordered them to, but also kept them in places of charge in the Armed Forces, dismissing both their role in the Cypriot coup d'état against Makarios, including Bonanos, Phaedon Gizikis and Petros Arapakis among others.

== Tributes ==
On 29 June 2005 an audio-visual tribute celebrating Konstantinos Karamanlis's contribution to Greek culture took place at the Odeon of Herodes Atticus. George Remoundos was the stage director and Stavros Xarhakos conducted and selected the music. The event under the title of Cultural Memories was organised by the Konstantinos G. Karamanlis Foundation. In 2007 several events were held to celebrate 100 years since his birth.

== See also ==
- History of Modern Greece
- List of presidents of Greece
- Politics of Greece

== Sources ==
- Clogg, Richard (1987). Parties and Elections in Greece: The Search for Legitimacy. Duke University Press. ISBN 978-0822307945.

Party political offices
Preceded by Alexander Papagos	Leader of the Greek Rally; 1955	Position abolished
New political party	President of the National Radical Union; 1955–1963	Succeeded by Panagiotis Kanellopoulos
New political party	President of New Democracy; 1974–1980	Succeeded by Georgios Rallis
Political offices
Preceded by Konstantinos Rendis	Minister for National Defence; 1950	Succeeded by Panagiotis Spiliotopoulos
Preceded by Alexandros Papagos	Prime Minister of Greece; 1955–1958	Succeeded by Konstantinos Georgakopoulos
Preceded by Panagiotis Kanellopoulos	Minister for National Defence; 1955–1956	Succeeded by Stergios Steriopoulos
Preceded by Konstantinos Georgakopoulos	Prime Minister of Greece; 1958–1961	Succeeded by Konstantinos Dovas
Preceded by Georgios Sergiopolis	Minister for National Defence; 1958–1961	Succeeded by Charalambos Potamianos
Preceded by Konstantinos Dovas	Prime Minister of Greece; 1961–1963	Succeeded by Panagiotis Pipinelis
Preceded by Adamantios Androutsopoulos	Prime Minister of Greece; 1974–1980	Succeeded by George Rallis
Preceded by Konstantinos Tsatsos	President of Greece; 1980–1985	Succeeded by Ioannis Alevras; Acting
Preceded by Christos Sartzetakis	President of Greece; 1990–1995	Succeeded by Konstantinos Stephanopoulos
Awards
Preceded by Walter Scheel	Recipient of the Charlemagne Prize; 1978	Succeeded by Emilio Colombo
