= Georgios Themelis =

Greek politician

Georgios Themelis (Greek: Γεώργιος Θεμελής; 1897–1969) was a Greek politician and officer of the Hellenic Air Force, who served as a Member of the Greek Parliament (1956–67) and as Deputy Defense Minister (1958–61). He was a controversial figure, due to his collaboration with the Nazis during World War II.

== Life ==
Son of Angelos Themelis, Georgios Themelis was born in 1897 in Thessaloniki then part of the Ottoman Empire. He graduated from the Hellenic Military Academy in 1918 and was originally an Army officer (serving in Army Aviation) until the Greek Air Force became an independent branch of the Greek Armed Forces, whereupon he was transferred to the Air Force.

During World War II, and after Greece was occupied by Nazi Germany in 1941, Themelis was appointed Prefect of Pella by the Greek collaborationist government.

After the end of the war, Themelis tried to justify his actions by claiming that he took that position in order to protect Greek national interests.

In the postwar years, Themelis was involved in politics, and served as a Member of the Greek Parliament from 1956 until 1967, with the conservative National Radical Union. In 1958-61, he was also Deputy Defense Minister.

He died in September 1969.
